= List of Tricholoma species =

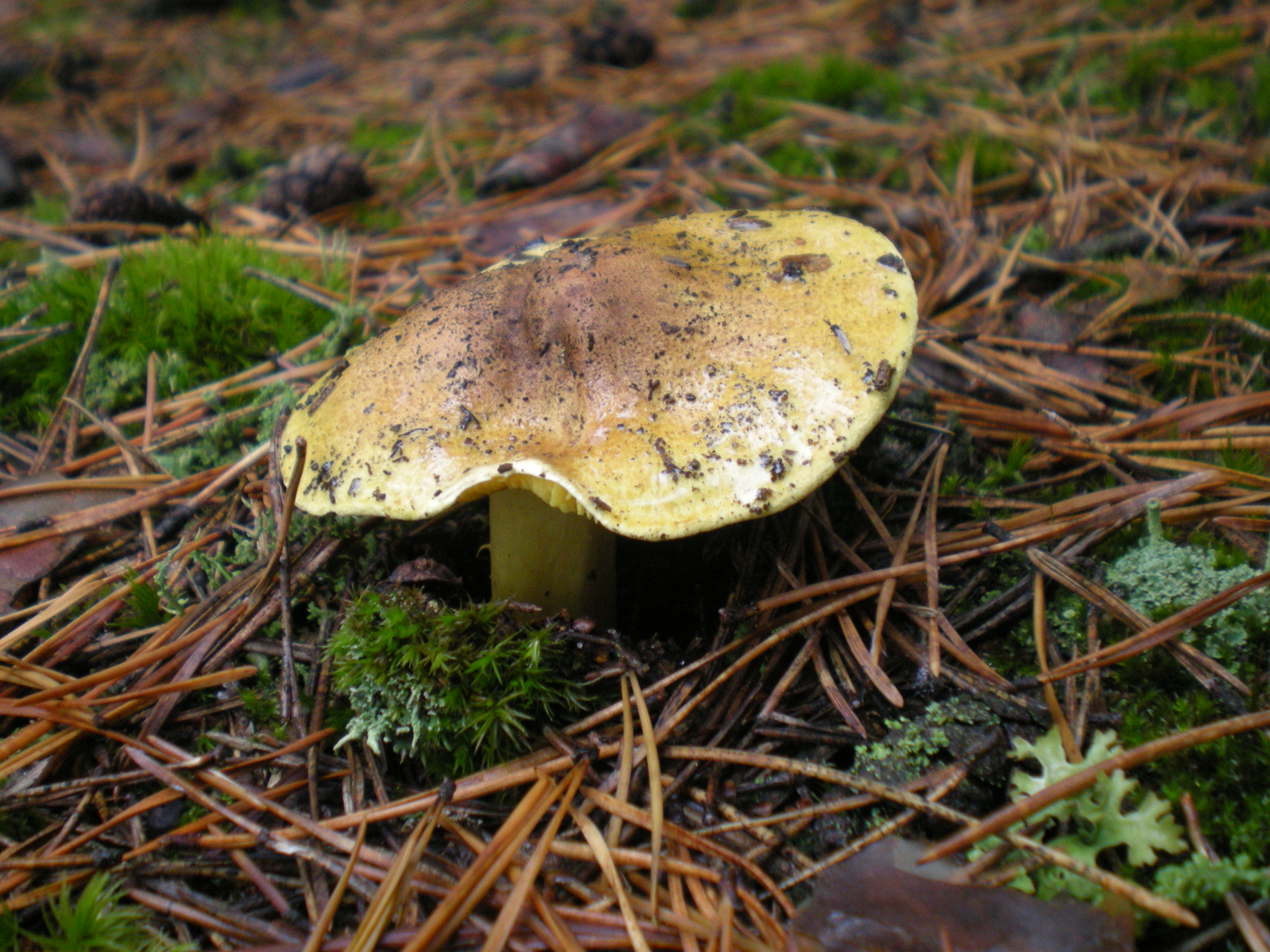
Tricholoma equestre (L. 1753) P.Kumm. 1871 is the type species of genus Tricholoma.

This is a list of species in the agaric genus Tricholoma. As of September 2021, Index Fungorum lists 379 species in the genus.

A B C D E F G H I J K L M N O P Q R S T U V U W X Y Z

== A ==
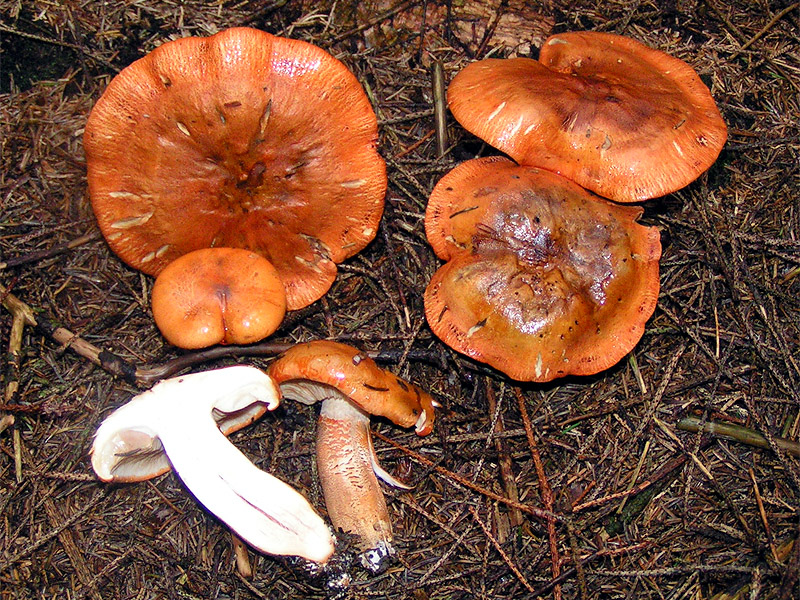
Tricholoma aurantium (Schaeff. 1774) Ricken 1914

- Tricholoma abietinum Velen. 1920 – Europe
- Tricholoma acerbum (Bull.) Quél. 1872
- Tricholoma acicularum Velen. 1947
- Tricholoma acutistramineum Corner 1994 – Singapore
- Tricholoma aeruginascens Corner 1994
- Tricholoma aestivum Velen. 1920 – Europe
- Tricholoma aestuans (Fr.) Gillet 1874
- Tricholoma albatum Velen. 1920 – Europe
- Tricholoma albidulum N.Ayala, G.Moreno & Esteve-Rav. 1997
- Tricholoma albidum Bon 1984
- Tricholoma albobrunneum (Pers.) P.Kumm. 1871
- Tricholoma alboconicum (J.E.Lange) Clémençon 1983
- Tricholoma alboluteum Velen. 1920 – Europe
- Tricholoma albosquamulatum Beeli 1927
- Tricholoma album (Schaeff.) P.Kumm. 1871
- Tricholoma altaicum Singer 1943
- Tricholoma ammophilum AD. Parker, Grubisha & SA. Trudell 2021
- Tricholoma amplum (Pers.) Rea 1922
- Tricholoma anatolicum H.H. Doğan & Intini, 2015
- Tricholoma andinum E. Horak 1964
- Tricholoma apium Jul. Schäff. 1925
- Tricholoma argenteum Ovrebo 1989
- Tricholoma argyraceum (Bull.) Gillet 1874
- Tricholoma argyropotamicum Speg. 1899
- Tricholoma arvernense Bon 1976 – Europe
- Tricholoma atro-olivaceum Rick 1939
- Tricholoma atrodiscum Ovrebo 1989
- Tricholoma atrofibrillosum S.A. Trudell, A.D. Parker & E.T. Cline 2021
- Tricholoma atroscriptum Corner 1994
- Tricholoma atrosquamosum Sacc. 1887
- Tricholoma atroviolaceum A.H.Sm. 1944 – North America
- Tricholoma aurantiipes Hongo 1991
- Tricholoma aurantio-olivaceum A.H.Sm. 1944 – North America
- Tricholoma aurantium (Schaeff.) Ricken 1914
- Tricholoma austrocolossum Grgur. 2002
- Tricholoma azalearum (Murrill) Murrill 1942

== B ==
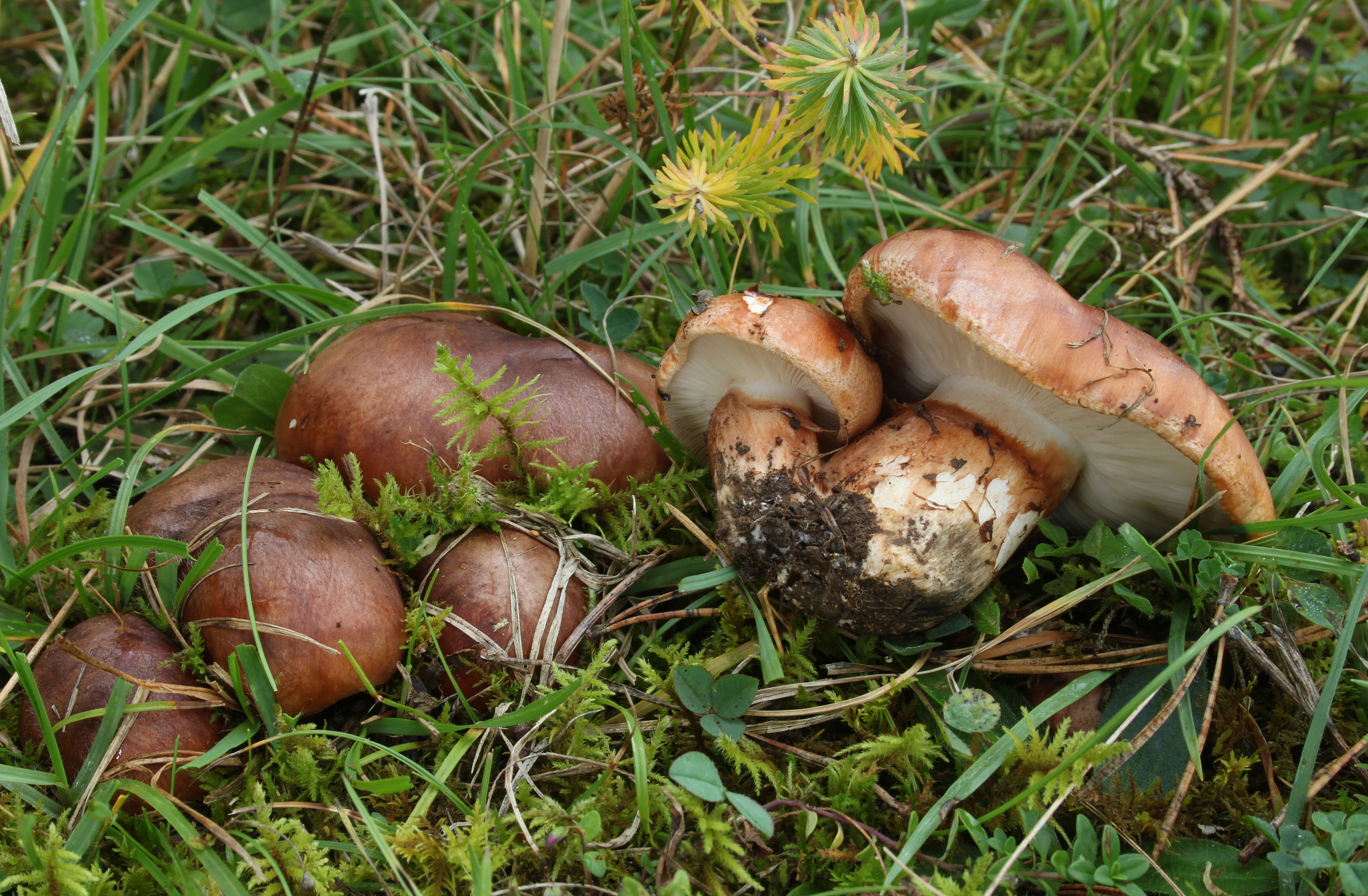
Tricholoma subannulatum (Batsch 1786) Bres. 1927

- Tricholoma badicephalum (Zeller) N.Siegel, S.A.Trudell & M.J.Gordon 2021 - North America + Finland
- Tricholoma bakamatsutake Hongo 1974
- Tricholoma baldratianum Sacc. 1916
- Tricholoma bambusarum Corner 1994
- Tricholoma basirubens (Bon) A.Riva & Bon 1988
- Tricholoma batschii Gulden 1969
- Tricholoma betilonganum Corner 1994
- Tricholoma bezdeki Velen. 1920 – Europe
- Tricholoma bisontinum Rolland 1902
- Tricholoma bonii Basso & Candusso 1997
- Tricholoma boreosulphurescens Mort. Chr. & Heilm.-Claus., 2017
- Tricholoma borgsjoeënse Jacobsson & Muskos 2006 – Fennoscandia
- Tricholoma borneomurinum Corner 1994
- Tricholoma bresadolanum Clémençon 1977
- Tricholoma brunneicirrus Corner 1994
- Tricholoma brunneosquamosa Beeli 1927
- Tricholoma bryogenum Mort. Chr., Heilm.-Claus. & Vauras, 2017
- Tricholoma bubalinum (G.Stev.) E.Horak 1971
- Tricholoma bufonium (Pers.) Gillet 1874
- Tricholoma bulliardii Velen. 1939 – Europe
- Tricholoma busuense Corner 1994
- Tricholoma buzae Dennis 1970

== C ==
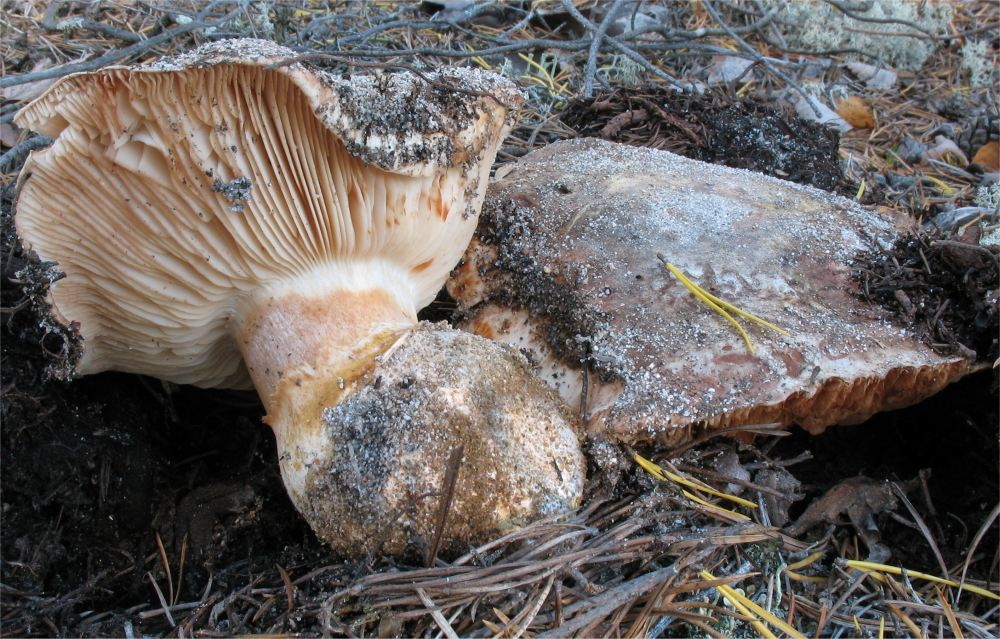
Tricholoma colossus (Fr. 1838) Quél. 1872

- Tricholoma caligatum (Viv.) Ricken 1914
- Tricholoma carbonicum Velen. 1920 – Europe
- Tricholoma carneoflavidum (Kalchbr.) McAlpine 1895
- Tricholoma cartilagineum (Bull.) Quél. 1872
- Tricholoma catulus E.H.L.Krause 1928
- Tricholoma cavipes Corner 1994
- Tricholoma cedretorum (Bon) A.Riva 2000
- Tricholoma cedrorum Maire 1914
- Tricholoma ceriniceps Pegler 1983
- Tricholoma cheilolaminum Ovrebo & Tylutki 1975
- Tricholoma chrysophyllum A.Riva, C.E.Hermos. & Jul.Sánchez 1998
- Tricholoma cifuentesii Courtec. 1985
- Tricholoma cingulatum (Almfelt ex Fr.) Jacobashch 1890
- Tricholoma cinnamomeum (Murrill) Murrill 1914
- Tricholoma clavipes Riedl 1976
- Tricholoma clavocystis Musumeci & Contu 2008 – Europe
- Tricholoma coffeaceum Velen. 1920 – Europe
- Tricholoma collybiiformis Velen. 1920 – Europe
- Tricholoma colossus (Fr.) Quél. 1872
- Tricholoma columbetta (Fr.) P.Kumm. 1871
- Tricholoma concolor (Delile ex De Seynes) P.-A.Moreau, Bellanger & Courtec. 2011
- Tricholoma confragipes Iwade 1944
- Tricholoma cookeanum Bertault & Malençon 1975
- Tricholoma cordae Velen. 1920 – Europe
- Tricholoma cortinatellum Singer 1954
- Tricholoma cortinatum Singer 1952
- Tricholoma crenulatum Horniček 1977
- Tricholoma crepidotoides Corner 1994
- Tricholoma crucigerum (St.-Amans) Sacc. & Trotter 191
- Tricholoma cuneifoloides (Fr.) P.Kumm. 1871
- Tricholoma cutifractum Corner 1994
- Tricholoma cyclophilum (Lasch) Sacc. & Trotter 1912
- Tricholoma czuicum (Singer) Singer, 1951

== D ==
- Tricholoma dermolomoides Corner 1994
- Tricholoma diabolicum Rick 1926
- Tricholoma diemii Singer 1954
- Tricholoma distantifoliaceum E.Ludw. & H.Willer 2012
- Tricholoma distinguendum S.Lundell 1942
- Tricholoma dulciolens Kytöv. 1989
- Tricholoma duriusculum R.Schulz 1927
- Tricholoma durum Velen. 1939 – Europe

== E ==
- Tricholoma edentulum Velen. 1920 – Europe
- Tricholoma elegans G.Stev. 1964 – New Zealand
- Tricholoma elvirae Singer 1969
- Tricholoma eosinobasis Babos, Bohus & Vasas 1991
- Tricholoma equestre (L.) P.Kumm. 1871
- Tricholoma evenosum (Sacc.) Rea 1932
- Tricholoma ezcarayense C.E.Hermos. & Jul.Sánchez 1994

== F ==
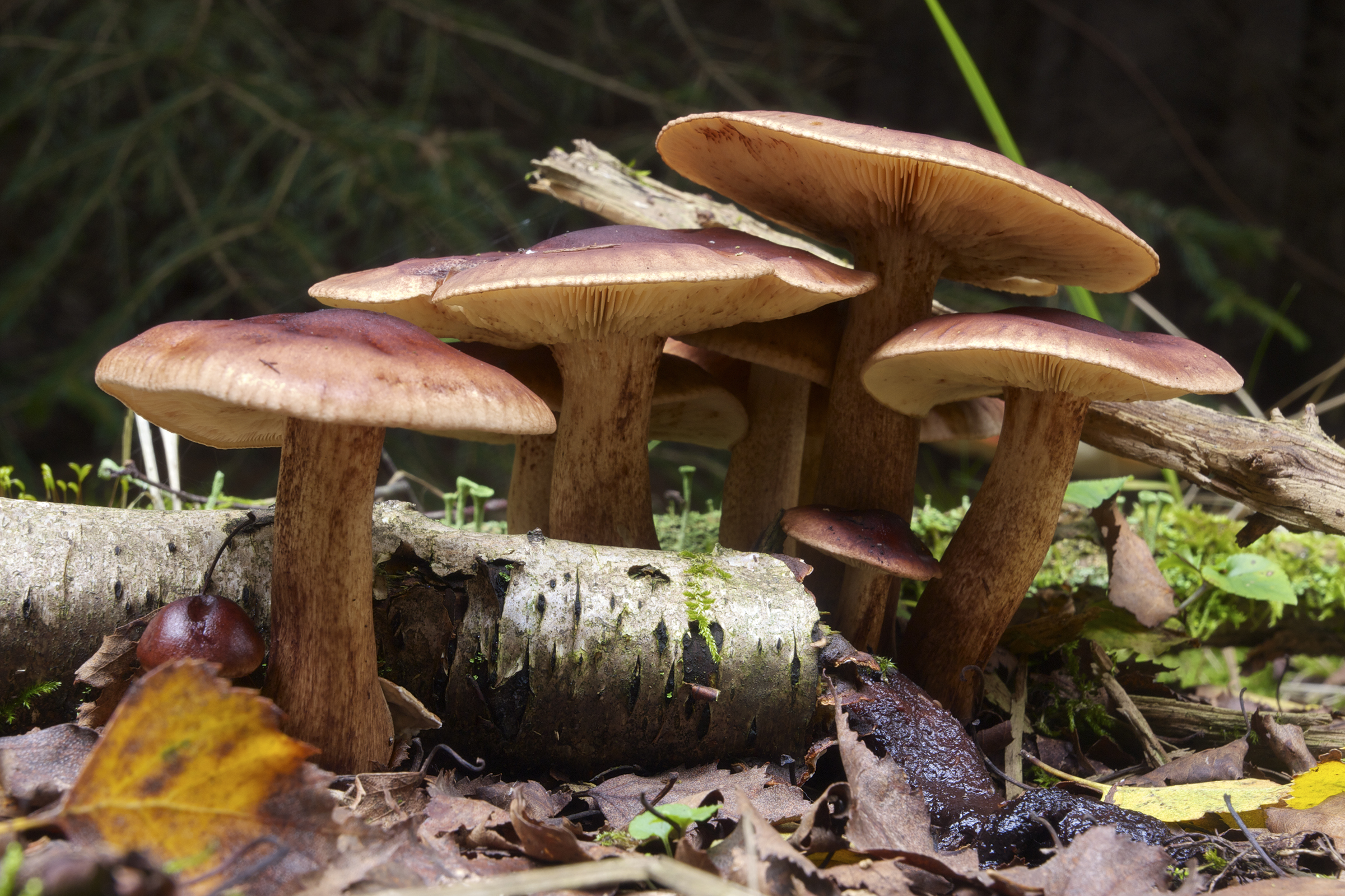
Tricholoma fulvum (Retz. 1769) Costantin & Dufour 1891

- Tricholoma fagineum Velen. 1925
- Tricholoma fagnani Singer 1952
- Tricholoma farinolens E.Horak 1964
- Tricholoma ferrugineimelleum Corner 1994
- Tricholoma fiherensis L.M.Dufour & H.Poiss. 1927
- Tricholoma filamentosum (Alessio) Alessio 1988
- Tricholoma fissilifolium Corner 1994
- Tricholoma flammulaecolor Beeli 1927
- Tricholoma flavifolium Velen. 1920 – Europe
- Tricholoma focale (Fr.) Ricken 1914
- Tricholoma foliicola Har.Takah. 2001
- Tricholoma forteflavescens Reschke, Popa, Zhu L. Yang & G. Kost, 2018
- Tricholoma fracticum (Britzelm.) Kreisel 1984
- Tricholoma fractipes Velen. 1920 – Europe
- Tricholoma frondosae Kalamees & Shchukin 2001
- Tricholoma fuegianum Courtec. 1985
- Tricholoma fuliginea Beeli 1927
- Tricholoma fulvimarginatum Ovrebo & Halling 1986
- Tricholoma fulvocastaneum Hongo 1960
- Tricholoma fulvum (Retz.) Costantin & Dufour 1891
- Tricholoma fumidellum (Peck) Sacc. 1887
- Tricholoma furcatifolium Corner 1994
- Tricholoma fuscinanum Corner 1994
- Tricholoma fusipes E.Horak 1964
- Tricholoma fusisporum Singer 1943

== G ==
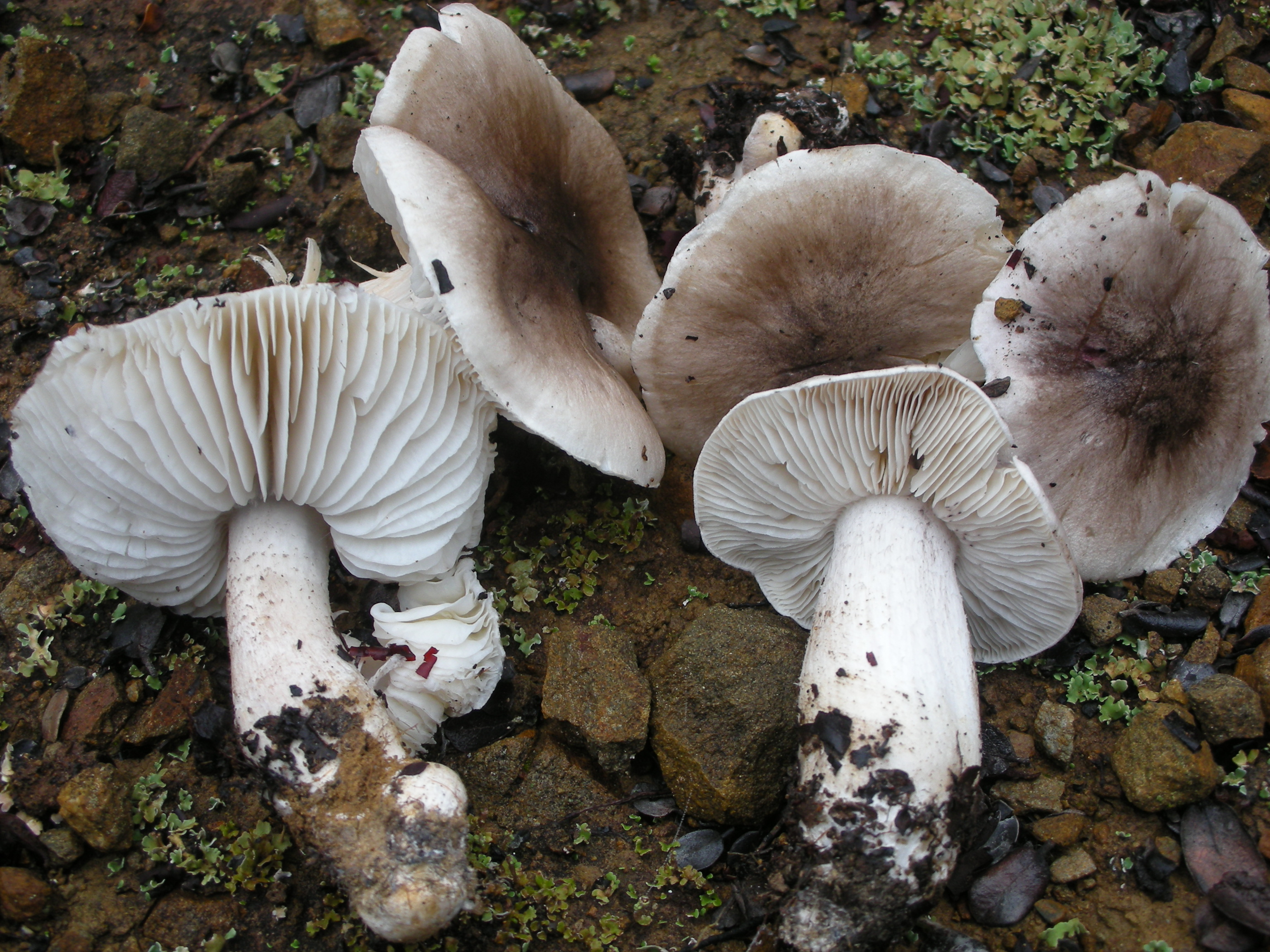
Tricholoma griseoviolaceumShanks 1996

- Tricholoma gallaecicum (Blanco-Dios) Blanco-Dios, 2009
- Tricholoma gausapatum (Fr.) Quél. 1872
- Tricholoma glareosum Velen. 1927
- Tricholoma glatfelteri (Murrill) Murrill 1914
- Tricholoma goliath (Fr.) S.Lundell & Nannf. 1942
- Tricholoma goossensiae Beeli 1933
- Tricholoma graminicola Velen. 1920 – Europe
- Tricholoma grande Peck 1891
- Tricholoma granulosum Lebedeva 1949
- Tricholoma griseipileatum Corner 1994
- Tricholoma griseoviolaceum Shanks 1996 – United States
- Tricholoma groanense Viola 1959
- Tricholoma grossulariodorum E.Horak 1964
- Tricholoma guldeniae Mort.Chr. 2009

== H ==
- Tricholoma hathorae Velen. 1939 – Europe
- Tricholoma hebeloma (Peck) Sacc. 1887
- Tricholoma hebelomoides E.Horak 1964
- Tricholoma hemisulphureum (Kühner) A. Riva ex Boffelli, 2016
- Tricholoma henningsii Sacc. & Trotter 1912
- Tricholoma hirtellum Peck 1907
- Tricholoma holici Velen. 1920 – Europe
- Tricholoma horakii Raithelh. 1972
- Tricholoma hortorum Velen. 1925
- Tricholoma humosum (Quél.) S.Imai 1938
- Tricholoma huronense A.H. Sm., 1942
- Tricholoma hygrophanum Velen. 1939 – Europe

== I ==
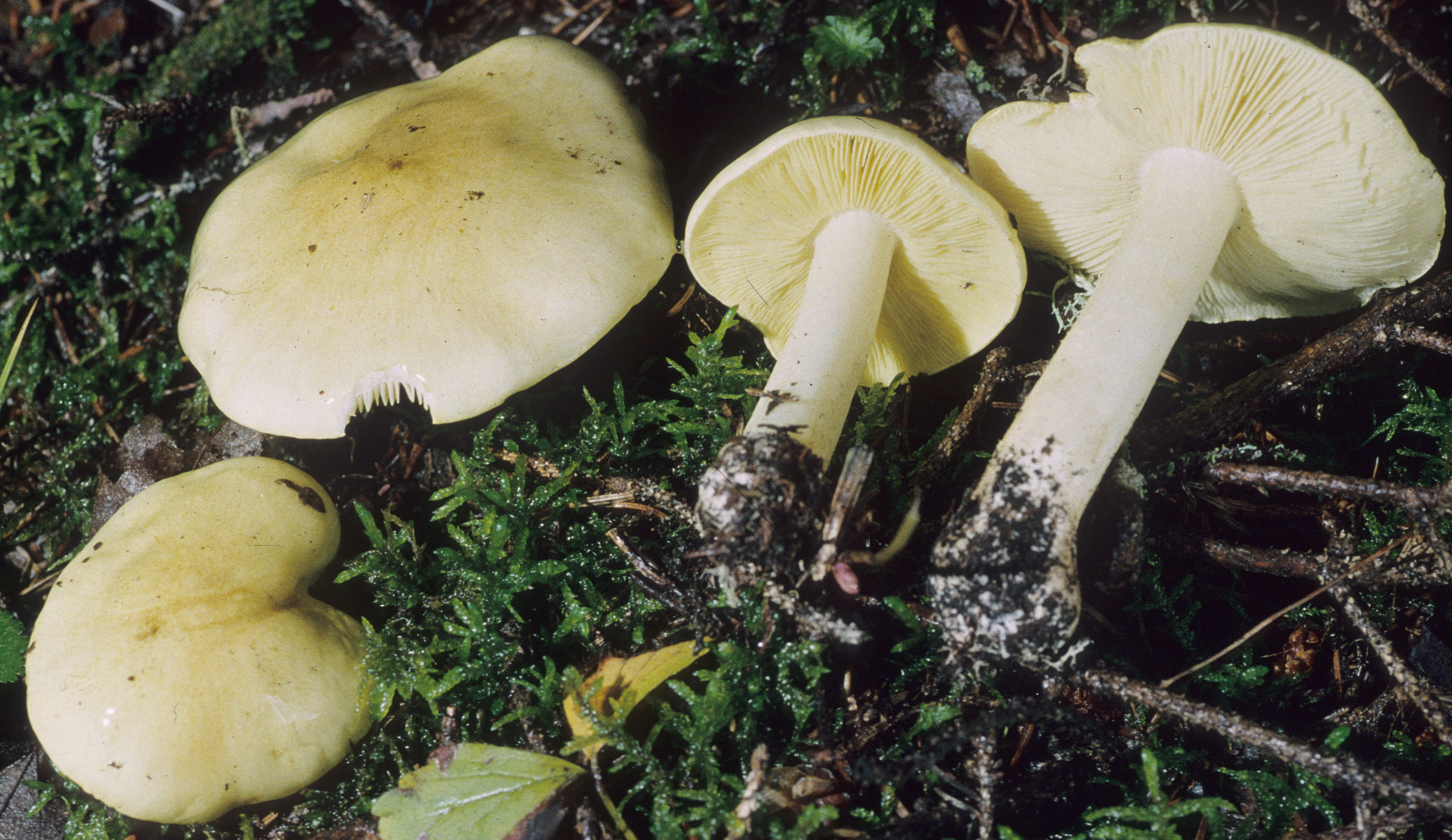
Tricholoma intermedium Peck 1888

- Tricholoma ilkkae Mort. Chr., Heilm.-Claus., Ryman & N. Bergius, 2017
- Tricholoma imbricatum (Fr.) P.Kumm. 1871
- Tricholoma impudicum Velen. 1947
- Tricholoma inamoenum (Fr.) Gillet 1874
- Tricholoma inocyboides Corner 1994
- Tricholoma insigne Ovrebo 1989
- Tricholoma intermedium Peck 1888
- Tricholoma iputingaense Bat. & A.F.Vital 1958

== J ==
- Tricholoma jalapense (Murrill) Sacc. & Trotter 1925
- Tricholoma jamaicensis (Murrill) Sacc. & Trotter 1925
- Tricholoma joachimii Bon & A.Riva 1985
- Tricholoma josserandii Bon 1975

== K ==
- Tricholoma khakicolor Corner 1994

== L ==
- Tricholoma laricicola Velen. 1939 – Europe
- Tricholoma lascivum (Fr.) Gillet 1874
- Tricholoma latifolium Speg. 1898
- Tricholoma lavendulophyllum F.Q.Yu 2006
- Tricholoma leoninum Velen. 1939 – Europe
- Tricholoma leucophyllum Ovrebo & Tylutki 1975
- Tricholoma leucoterreum Mariotto & Turetta 1996
- Tricholoma lilacinocinereum Métrod ex Bon 1990
- Tricholoma lobatum Velen. 1939 – Europe
- Tricholoma losii Kavina 1926
- Tricholoma luridum (Schaeff.) P.Kumm. 1871
- Tricholoma luteomaculosum A.H. Sm., 1942

== M ==
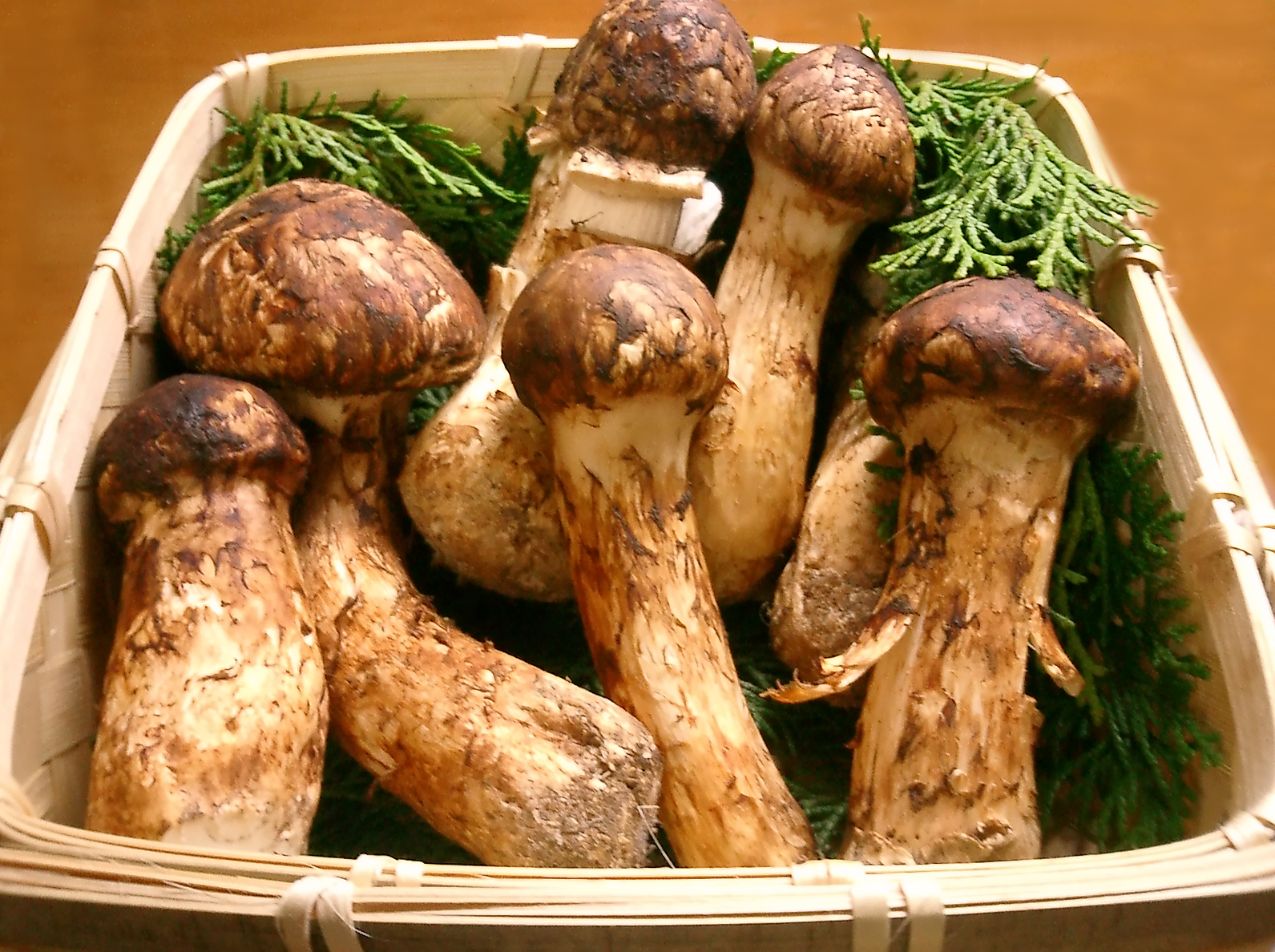
Matsutake (Tricholoma matsutake (S.Ito & S.Imai 1925) Singer 1943) is a choice edible species.

- Tricholoma maculatipus Hongo 1962
- Tricholoma magellanicum (Speg.) Sacc. 1891
- Tricholoma magnivelare (Peck) Redhead 1984
- Tricholoma manzanitae T.J.Baroni & Ovrebo 1983
- Tricholoma marasmiforme Velen. 1939 – Europe
- Tricholoma margarita (Murrill) Murrill 1940
- Tricholoma marquettense Ovrebo 1986
- Tricholoma matsutake (S.Ito & S.Imai) Singer 1943
- Tricholoma mauritianum Peerally & Sutra 1973
- Tricholoma megalophaeum N. Siegel, S.A. Trudell & A. D. Parker 2021
- Tricholoma megaphyllum Boud. 1910
- Tricholoma melleum Reschke, Popa, Zhu L. Yang & G. Kost, 2018
- Tricholoma mensula Corner 1994
- Tricholoma meridianum A.Pearson 1950
- Tricholoma mesoamericanum Justo & Cifuentes, 2017
- Tricholoma michiganense A.H. Sm., 1942
- Tricholoma microcarpoides Corner 1994
- Tricholoma minutissimum Corner 1994
- Tricholoma minutum Corner 1994
- Tricholoma mnichovicense Velen. 1947
- Tricholoma montis-fraseri Corner 1994
- Tricholoma moseri Singer 1989
- Tricholoma moserianum Bon 1990
- Tricholoma mostnyae Singer 1969
- Tricholoma multifolium (Murrill) Murrill 1914
- Tricholoma multipunctum (Peck) Sacc. 1887
- Tricholoma muricatum Shanks 1996 – United States
- Tricholoma murrillianum Singer 1942 – North America
- Tricholoma muscarioides Reschke, Popa, Zhu L. Yang & G. Kost, 2018
- Tricholoma muscarium Kawam. ex Hongo 1959
- Tricholoma muscorum Velen. 1947
- Tricholoma mutabile Shanks 1996 – United States

== N ==
- Tricholoma naranjanum Dennis 1951
- Tricholoma nigripes Velen. 1920 – Europe
- Tricholoma nigrum Shanks & Ovrebo 1996 – North America
- Tricholoma nobile Peck 1889

== O ==
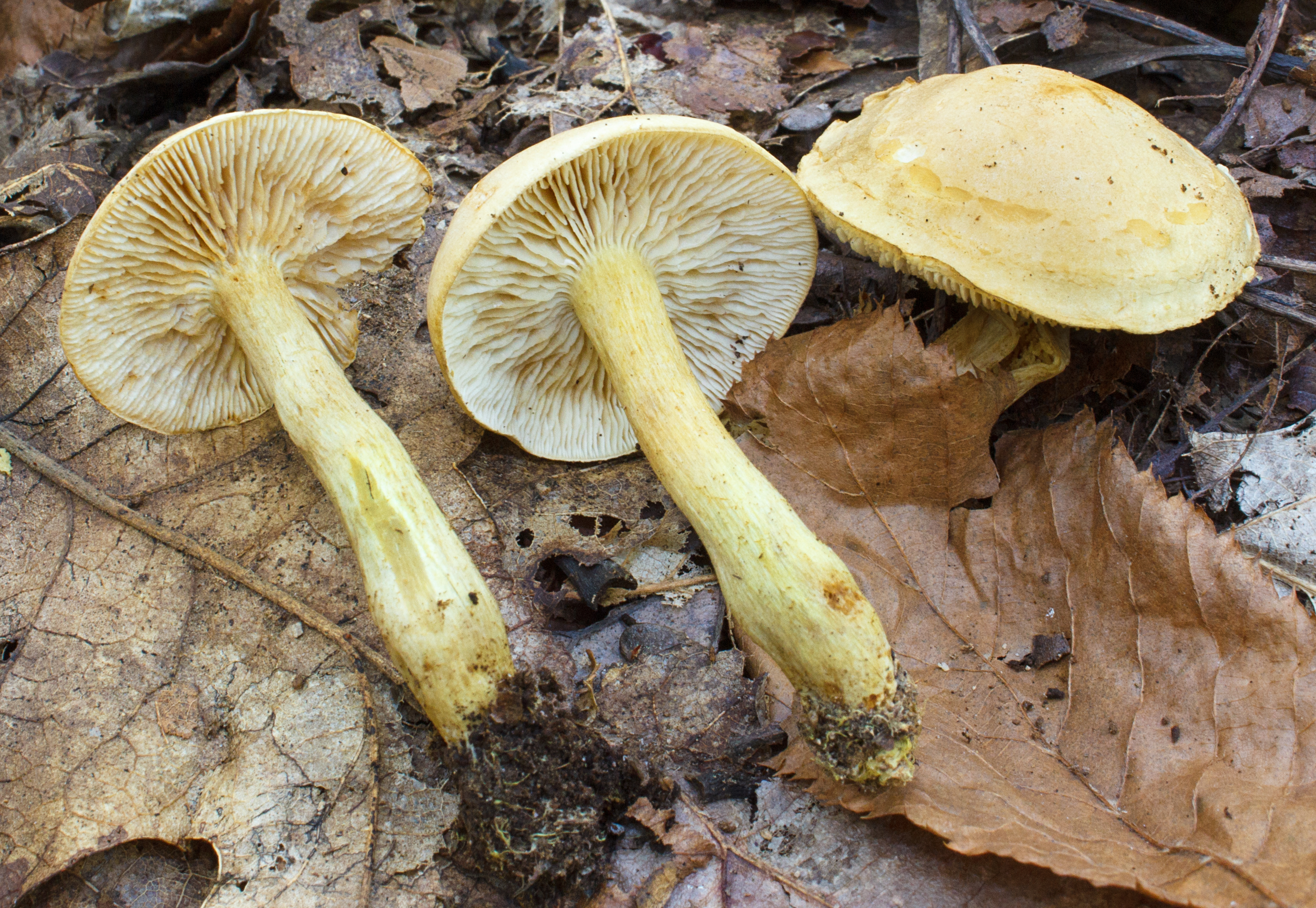
Tricholoma odorum Peck 1898

- Tricholoma oblongisporum Bissett 1992
- Tricholoma obscurum Velen. 1920 – Europe
- Tricholoma ochraceorobustum E.Horak 1964
- Tricholoma odorimutabile Corner 1994
- Tricholoma olens Velen. 1939 – Europe
- Tricholoma olgae Velen. 1920 – Europe
- Tricholoma olidum Velen. 1920 – Europe
- Tricholoma olivaceobrunneum Ovrebo 1986
- Tricholoma olivaceoflavum (Murrill) Sacc. & Trotter 1925
- Tricholoma olivaceoluteolum Reschke, Popa, Zhu L. Yang & G. Kost, 2018
- Tricholoma olivaceotinctum Heilm.-Claus. & Mort. Chr. 2009
- Tricholoma olivaceum Reschke, Popa, Zhu L. Yang & G. Kost, 2018
- Tricholoma oliveum Farl. & Burt, 1929
- Tricholoma opiparum (Fr.) Bigeard & H. Guill. 1909
- Tricholoma orirubens Quél. 1872
- Tricholoma orlosii Pilát 1950

== P ==
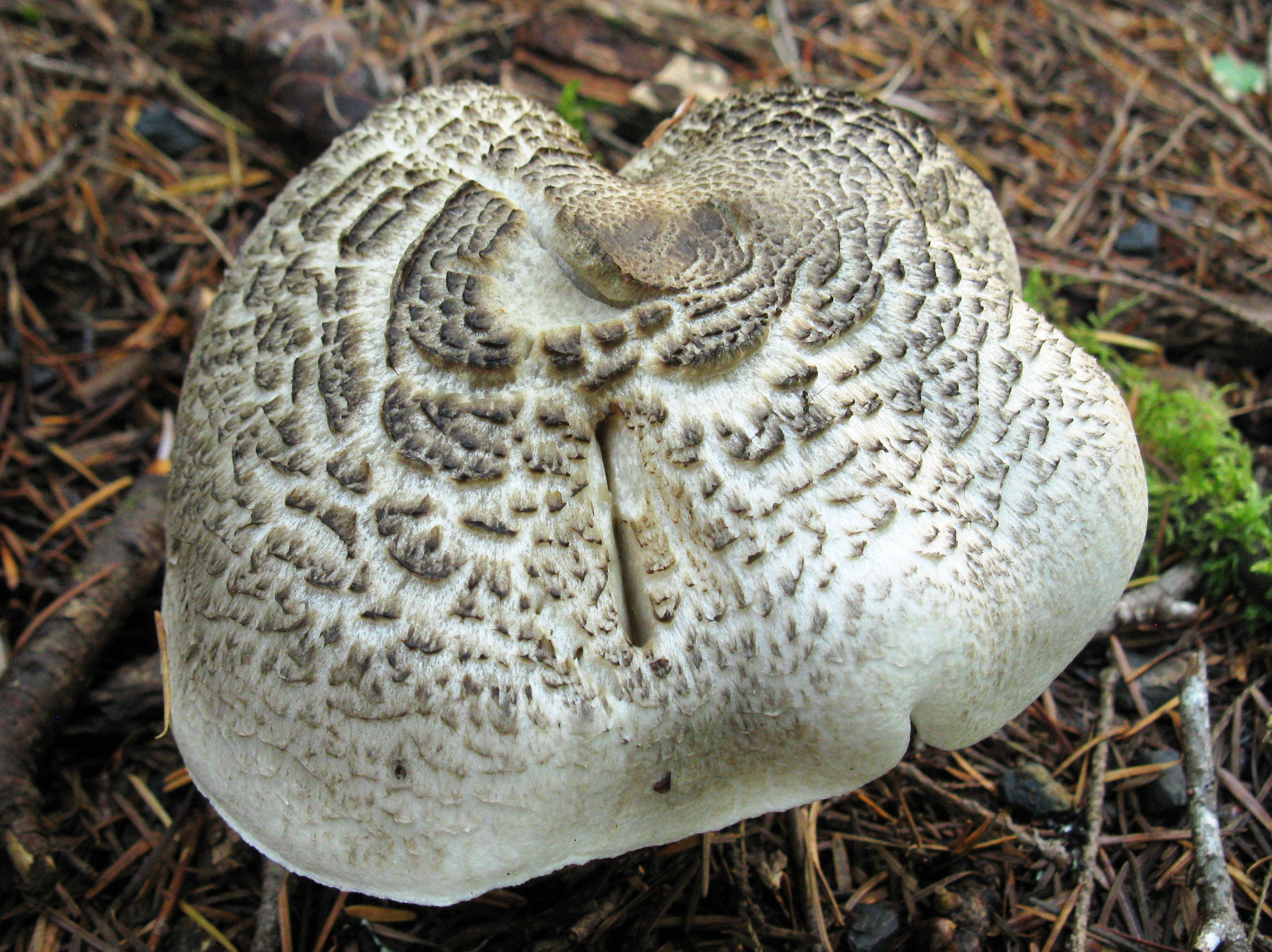
Tricholoma pardinum (Pers. 1801) Quél. 1873

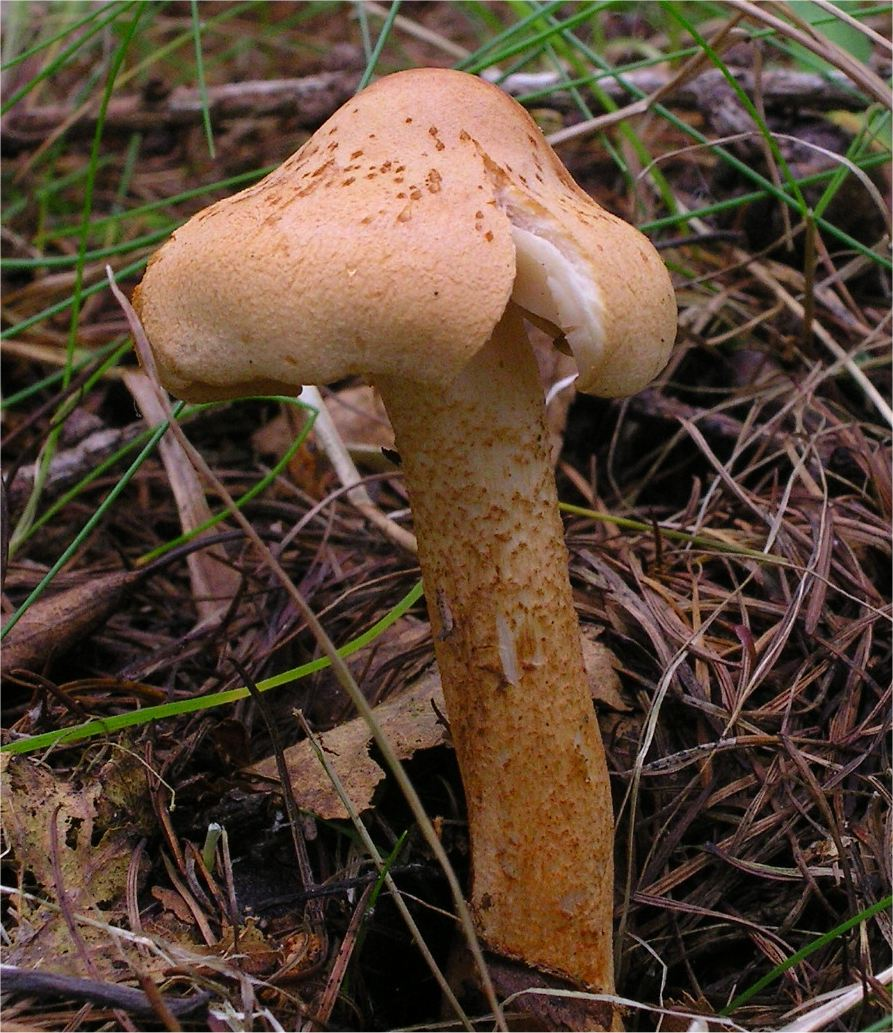
Tricholoma psammopus (Kalchbr. 1873) Quél. 1875

- Tricholoma palustre A.H.Sm. 1942
- Tricholoma pampeanum Speg. 1898
- Tricholoma panicolor Corner 1994
- Tricholoma pannonicum Bohus, 1960
- Tricholoma pardalotum Herink & Kotl. 1967
- Tricholoma pardinum (Pers.) Quél. 1873
- Tricholoma parvisporum Corner 1994
- Tricholoma pascuum Velen. 1939 – Europe
- Tricholoma patagonicum Singer 1954
- Tricholoma penangense Corner 1994
- Tricholoma permelleum Corner 1994
- Tricholoma persicinum (Fr.) Quél. 1872
- Tricholoma pessundatum (Fr.) Quél. 1872
- Tricholoma phoeniceum (Sacc.) Singer 1943
- Tricholoma piceum Velen. 1947
- Tricholoma pilatii Velen. 1925
- Tricholoma plagiotum (Kalchbr.) McAlpine 1895
- Tricholoma platyphyllum (Murrill) Murrill 1913
- Tricholoma populinum J.E.Lange 1933
- Tricholoma porta-dalveyi Corner 1994
- Tricholoma portentosum (Fr.) Quél. 1873
- Tricholoma praetervisum Velen. 1939 – Europe
- Tricholoma pratense Pegler & R.W.Rayner 1969
- Tricholoma preslii Velen. 1920 – Europe
- Tricholoma primulibrunneum Corner 1994
- Tricholoma psammopus (Kalchbr.) Quél. 1875
- Tricholoma pseudoargyraceum Velen. 1925
- Tricholoma pseudoimbricatum J.E.Lange & Terk. 1944
- Tricholoma pseudolimacium Velen. 1920 – Europe
- Tricholoma pseudonictitans Bon 1983
- Tricholoma pseudoputidum Velen. 1939 – Europe
- Tricholoma pseudorussula (Speg.) Sacc. 1891
- Tricholoma pseudosaponaceum Hásek 1959
- Tricholoma pullum Ovrebo 1989
- Tricholoma pulverulentipes (Murrill) Sacc. & Trotter 1925
- Tricholoma purpureiflavum Corner 1994
- Tricholoma pusillisporum Speg. 1922
- Tricholoma pygmaeum Velen. 1920 – Europe

== Q ==
- Tricholoma quercetorum Contu 2004
- Tricholoma quercicola (Murrill) Murrill 1949

== R ==
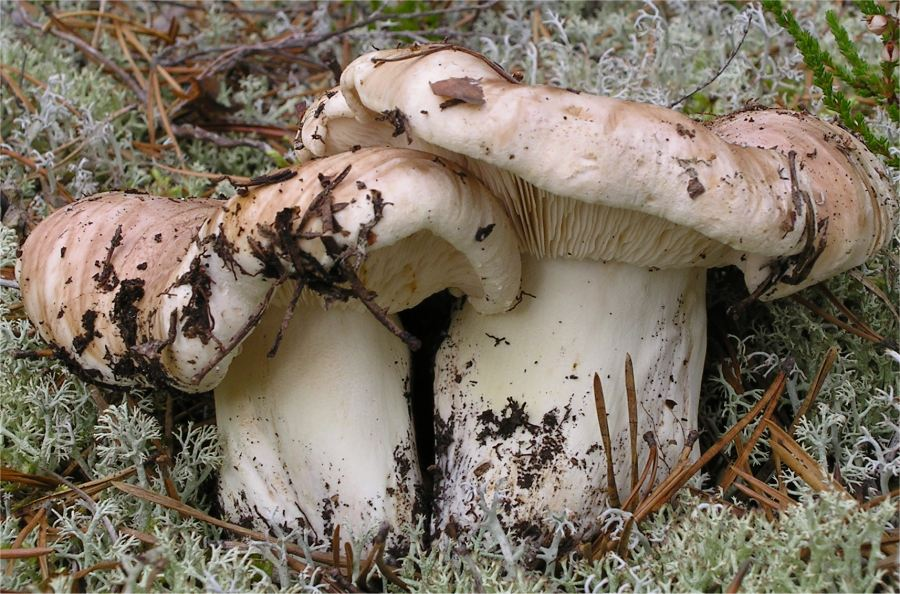
Tricholoma roseoacerbum A.Riva 1984

- Tricholoma radicans Hongo 1968 – Japan
- Tricholoma radotinense Peck 1903
- Tricholoma ramentaceum (Bull.) Ricken 1915
- Tricholoma rauli Garrido 1988
- Tricholoma rhizophoreti Corner 1994
- Tricholoma rigidovelatum Raithelh. 1991
- Tricholoma rimosoides Dennis 1951
- Tricholoma robiniae Velen. 1925
- Tricholoma robustum (Alb. & Schwein.) Ricken 1915
- Tricholoma romagnesii Singer 1943
- Tricholoma roseoacerbum A.Riva 1984 – Europe, North America
- Tricholoma rostratum Velen. 1920 – Europe
- Tricholoma rubescens Velen. 1920 – Europe
- Tricholoma rufenum P.Donati 1994
- Tricholoma rufulum R.Heim 1934
- Tricholoma rugulicinctum Corner 1994

== S ==
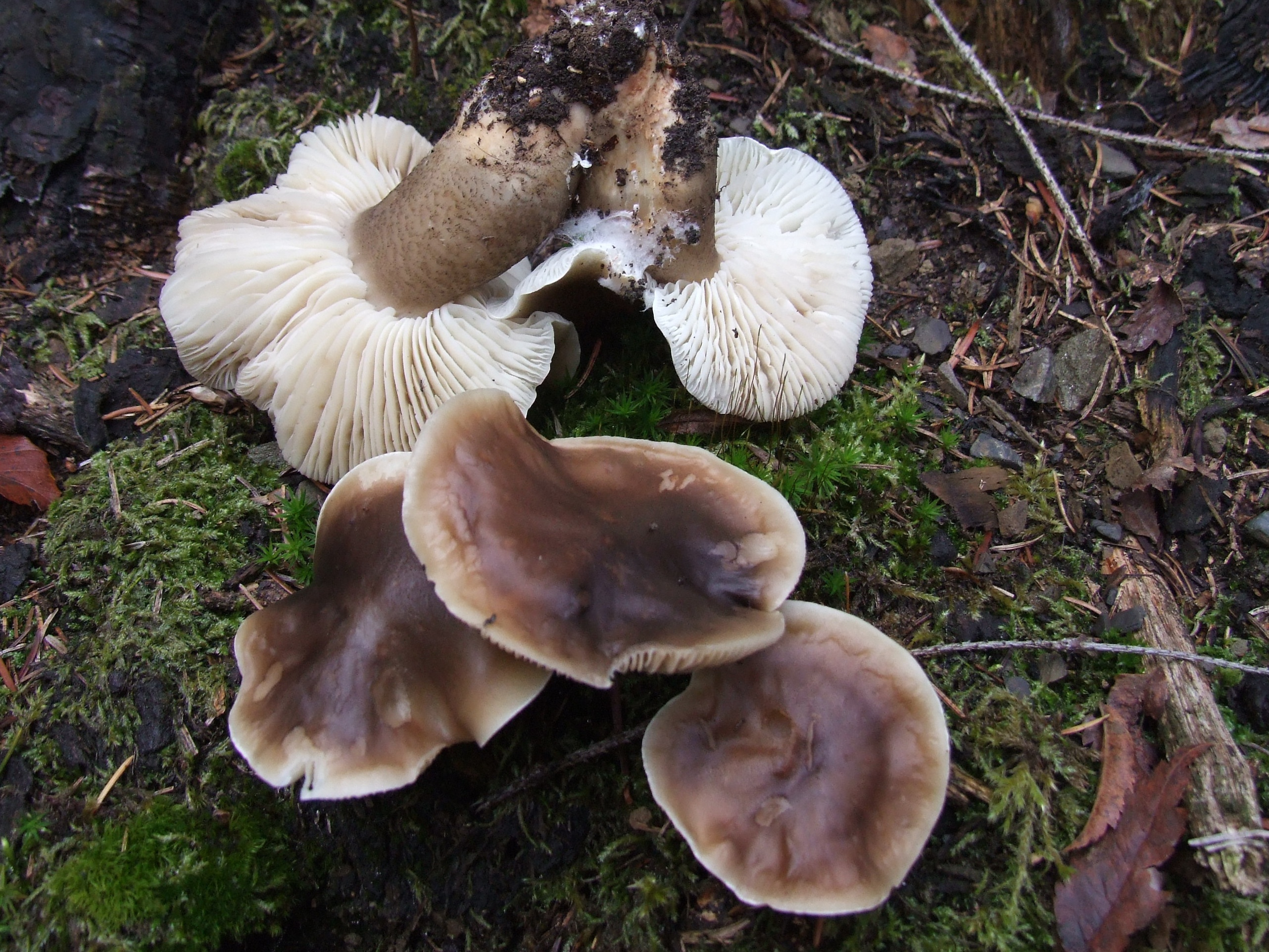
Tricholoma saponaceum (Fr. 1818) P.Kumm. 1871

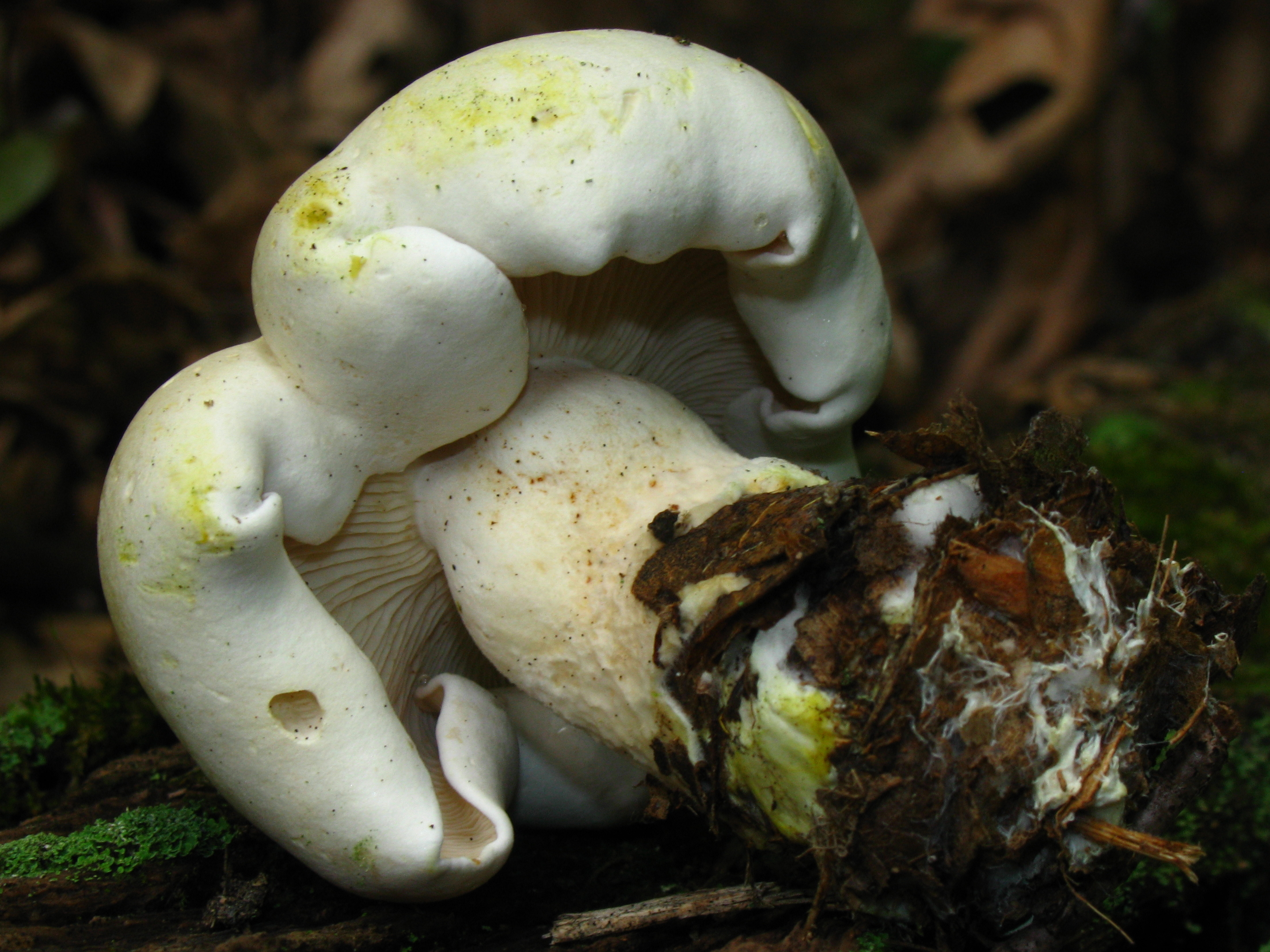
Tricholoma sulphurescens Bres. 1905

- Tricholoma sanguinescens Velen. 1925
- Tricholoma saponaceum (Fr.) P.Kumm. 1871
- Tricholoma scabrum L.M.Dufour 1913
- Tricholoma scalpturatum (Fr.) Quél. 1872
- Tricholoma schustleri Velen. 1920 – Europe
- Tricholoma sciodes (Pers.) C.Martín 1919
- Tricholoma sejunctum (Sowerby) Quél. 1872
- Tricholoma sericeum Rick 1920
- Tricholoma sienna (Peck) Sacc. 1887
- Tricholoma silvaticum Peck 1889
- Tricholoma singaporense Corner 1994
- Tricholoma sinoacerbum T.H. Li, Hosen & Ting Li, 2015
- Tricholoma sinopardinum Zhu L. Yang, X.X. Ding, G. Kost & Rexer, 2017
- Tricholoma sinoportentosum Zhu L. Yang, Reschke, Popa & G. Kost, 2018
- Tricholoma smithii Ovrebo & K.W. Hughes, 2018
- Tricholoma solitarium (Alessio) Contu 2009
- Tricholoma sparsifolium Velen. 1925
- Tricholoma sphagnicola Hruby 1930
- Tricholoma spongiosum Petch 1917
- Tricholoma stanekii Pilát 1953
- Tricholoma stans (Fr.) Sacc. 1887
- Tricholoma stiparophyllum (N.Lund) P.Karst. 1879
- Tricholoma stipitirufescens Corner 1994
- Tricholoma striatifolium (Peck) Sacc. 1887
- Tricholoma striatum (Schaeff.) Quél. 1872
- Tricholoma subacutum Peck 1889
- Tricholoma subamarum Herp. 1912
- Tricholoma subannulatum (Peck) Zeller 1922
- Tricholoma subargillaceum (Murrill) Sacc. & Trotter 1925
- Tricholoma subaureum Ovrebo 1986
- Tricholoma subcinerascens Rick 1939
- Tricholoma subcinereiforme (Murrill) Sacc. & Trotter 1925
- Tricholoma subclytocybe Velen. 1925
- Tricholoma subcuneifolium Corner 1994
- Tricholoma subfuscum Velen. 1920 – Europe
- Tricholoma subglobisporum Bon 1976 – Europe
- Tricholoma subimbricatum Velen. 1920 – Europe
- Tricholoma sublatum Murrill 1942
- Tricholoma subluteum Peck, 1904
- Tricholoma subniveum Velen. 1925
- Tricholoma subresplendens (Murrill) Murrill, 1914
- Tricholoma subsulphureum (Britzelm.) Sacc. & Traverso 1911
- Tricholoma subumbrinum A.H.Sm. 1944 – North America
- Tricholoma sudum (Fr.) Quél. 1873
- Tricholoma sulcatum Velen. 1920 – Europe
- Tricholoma sulphurellum Rick 1919
- Tricholoma sulphurescens Bres. 1905
- Tricholoma sulphureum (Bull.) P.Kumm. 1871

== T ==
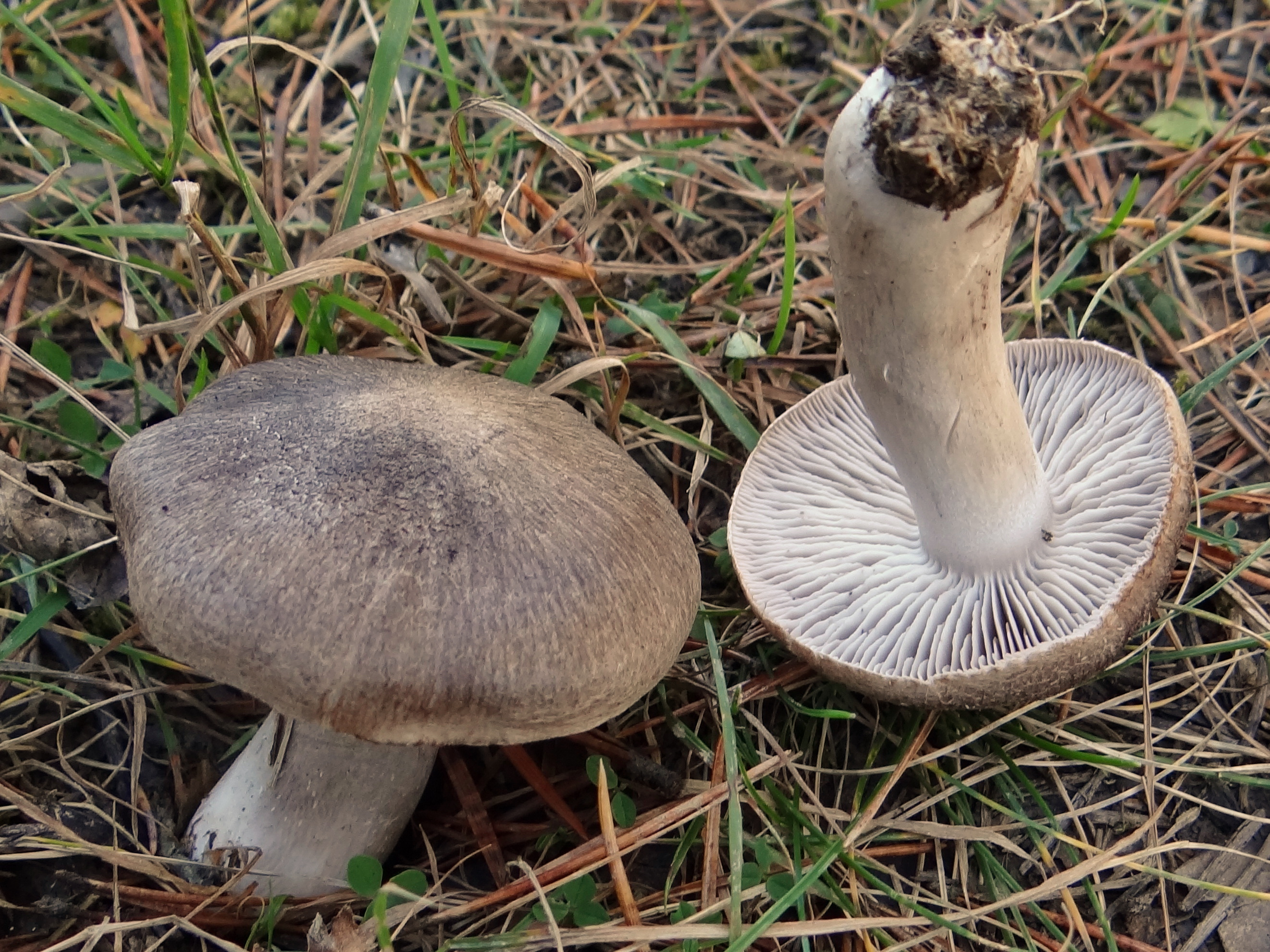
Tricholoma terreum (Schaeff. 1774) P.Kumm. 1871

- Tricholoma tanzanianum Pegler 1977
- Tricholoma tenacifolium Corner 1994
- Tricholoma tenue P.W.Graff 1914
- Tricholoma terreum (Schaeff.) P.Kumm. 1871
- Tricholoma testaceum G.Stev. 1964 – New Zealand
- Tricholoma thalliophilum Rob.Henry 1956
- Tricholoma tigrinum (Schaeff.) Gillet 1874
- Tricholoma transmutans (Peck) Sacc., 1887
- Tricholoma tridentinum Singer 1943
- Tricholoma triste (Scop.) Quél. 1872
- Tricholoma tristiforme Kauffman 1921
- Tricholoma tucumanense Speg. 1919
- Tricholoma tumidum (Pers.) Ricken 1915
- Tricholoma turbinipes (Kalchbr.) McAlpine 1895

== U ==
- Tricholoma uliginosum Velen. 1920 – Europe
- Tricholoma ulvinenii Kalamees 2001
- Tricholoma umbonatum Clémençon & Bon 1985
- Tricholoma umbraticum Corner 1994
- Tricholoma unifactum Peck 1906
- Tricholoma urbicum Ferrarese & Zaffalon 2008
- Tricholoma uropus Corner 1994
- Tricholoma ustale (Fr.) P.Kumm. 1871
- Tricholoma ustaloides Romagn. 1954

== V ==
- Tricholoma vaccinoides Pilát 1971
- Tricholoma vaccinum (Schaeff.) P.Kumm. 1871
- Tricholoma vacini Velen. 1939 – Europe
- Tricholoma venenatum G.F. Atk., 1908
- Tricholoma vernale Velen. 1920 – Europe
- Tricholoma vernaticum Shanks 1996 – United States
- Tricholoma versicolor Velen. 1920 – Europe
- Tricholoma vestipes Velen. 1920 – Europe
- Tricholoma villosiparvum Corner 1994
- Tricholoma vinaceogriseum P.D.Orton 1987
- Tricholoma violaceibrunneum Corner 1994
- Tricholoma virgatum (Fr.) P.Kumm. 1871
- Tricholoma viridifucatum Bon 1976 – Europe
- Tricholoma viridilutescens M.M.Moser 1978
- Tricholoma viridiolivaceum G.Stev. 1964 – New Zealand

== W ==
- Tricholoma weizianum Reichert & Aviz.-Hersh. 1959

== Y ==
- Tricholoma yatesii Murrill, 1914

== Z ==
- Tricholoma zangii Z.M.Cao, Y.J.Yao & Pegler 2003 – China
- Tricholoma zelleri (D.E.Stuntz & A.H.Sm.) Ovrebo & Tylutki 1975
- Tricholoma zonatum Velen. 1939 – Europe
- Tricholoma zvarae Velen. 1922
