= Tricholoma badicephalum =

Scientific classification
- Kingdom: Fungi
- Division: Basidiomycota
- Class: Agaricomycetes
- Order: Agaricales
- Family: Tricholomataceae
- Genus: Tricholoma
- Species: T. badicephalum

Binomial name
- Tricholoma badicephalum (Zeller) N. Siegel, S.A. Trudell & M.J. Gordon (2021)

Synonyms
- Armillaria badicephala Zeller (1935)

Species of fungus

Tricholoma badicephalum
- Mycological characteristics
- Gills on hymenium
- Cap is convex or flat
- Hymenium is adnexed or sinuate
- Stipe has a ring
- Spore print is white
- Ecology is mycorrhizal
- Edibility is unknown

Tricholoma badicephalum, commonly known as the bay-headed trich, is a species of mushroom in the family Tricholomataceae.

== Taxonomy ==
Tricholoma badicephalum was first described in 1935 by Sanford Myron Zeller as Armillaria badicephala. However, the scientific community soon forgot about the species, and many collections were misidentified as T. focale and T. robustum. In 2021, it was transferred to the genus Tricholoma.

== Description ==
Tricholoma badicephalum has a tan to brown cap that is about 3-10 centimeters in diameter. It starts out convex and becomes broadly convex to flat as the mushroom matures. It has an inrolled margin when young. The surface is scaly to appressed-fibrillose. The stipe is about 4-8 centimeters long and 1-3 centimeters wide, with an annulus. Below the annulus, the stipe is scaly. The gills are adnexed and notched, sometimes appearing free. They are whitish in color and sometimes develop orange stains in age. Partial gills are present and in large numbers. The spore print is white. The mushroom has a strong farinaceous scent.

=== Similar species ===
Tricholoma badicephalum is similar to T. focale, but T. badicephalum is scalier, drier, and typically lacks orange tones in its cap.

== Habitat and distribution ==
Tricholoma badicephalum is found under conifers, and often grows in poor-quality soils. It can be found in sandy soil in coastal forests. It was originally described from Oregon.
