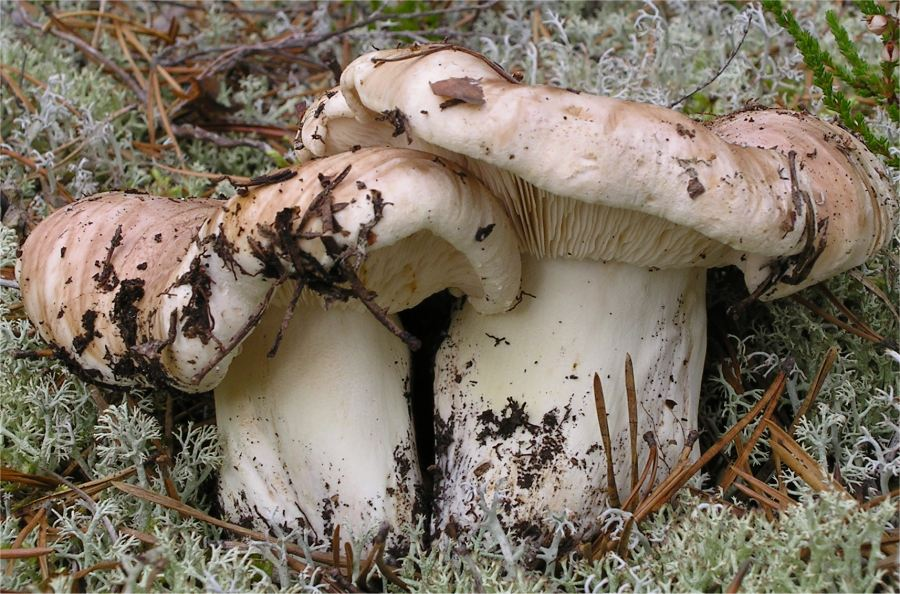

Conservation status
- Near Threatened (IUCN 3.1)

Scientific classification
- Kingdom: Fungi
- Division: Basidiomycota
- Class: Agaricomycetes
- Order: Agaricales
- Family: Tricholomataceae
- Genus: Tricholoma
- Species: T. roseoacerbum

Binomial name
- Tricholoma roseoacerbum A.Riva (1984)

Synonyms
- Tricholoma pseudoimbricatum var. roseobrunneum A.Riva (1979)

= Tricholoma roseoacerbum =

Species of mushroom-forming fungus

Tricholoma roseoacerbum is an agaric fungus of the family Tricholomataceae. T. roseoacerbum is found in Europe and northeastern North America. The specific epithet roseoacerbum alludes to the rosy colouration in its cap, and overall resemblance to T. acerbum.

== Taxonomy ==
The species was first described by the Italian mycologist Alfredo Riva in 1979 as Tricholoma pseudoimbricatum var. roseobrunneum, but that name competed with an older homonym, William Murrill's 1913 Tricholoma roseobrunneum. Riva published the species with a new replacement name in 1984.

== Description ==
Tricholoma roseoacerbum forms large, stocky mushrooms with short, thick stipes measuring 3–5 cm in height and 1.5–2.5 cm across. The caps can reach up to 12 cm in diameter, starting out rounded with inwardly curved edges when young, then becoming nearly flat with age. Young specimens have distinctive white caps marked with rust-brown streaks that resemble brush strokes. As the mushrooms mature, the cap colour darkens to whitish-brown or becomes uniformly light brown. The surface is slightly sticky to the touch in wet conditions.

The gills beneath the cap are free from the stipe and white in colour. Unlike some similar species, the stipe lacks a ring or other membranous remnants. Microscopic features include colourless, smooth spores measuring 3.3–6.6 by 3–4.3 micrometre (μm), each containing one or two oil droplets. These spores show no colour reaction when tested with iodine solution (a standard test used by mycologists). The spore-producing cells, called basidia, measure about 19.8 by 26.4 μm.

This species can be distinguished from the similar T. acerbum by its weakly sticky cap surface and characteristic rust-coloured streaks, and from young specimens of T. colossus by its lack of a stipe ring and smaller spores.

== Habitat and distribution ==
Tricholoma roseoacerbum is found in coniferous and mixed forests, typically associated with fir (Abies) and spruce (Picea abies), and occasionally with beech (Fagus) and fir forests. In Scandinavia, it grows in xerothermic pine (warm and dry) heathlands with pine (Pinus). Some authors also report it from xerophilic (dry-loving) mixed deciduous forests dominated by Aesculus and Quercus. In France and Poland, it is commonly found in fir forests.

The species is distributed across Europe, including Austria, Belgium, Croatia, Finland, France, Spain, Portugal, Czech Republic, Slovakia, Switzerland, Sweden, and Italy. Outside Europe, it occurs in North America (from Canada to Mexico) and Japan.

In Poland, where it was first recorded in 2012–2019, T. roseoacerbum has been found at ten sites in the Śląskie and Małopolskie Voivodships at elevations between 380 and 900 m above sea level. Most Polish locations are in fir forests with spruce, with some in beech-fir forests. In some countries, it is considered rare: near threatened (NT) in Finland and vulnerable (VU) in Sweden.

== See also ==
- List of North American Tricholoma species
- List of Tricholoma species
