= Tricholoma brunneicirrus =

Scientific classification
- Domain: Eukaryota
- Kingdom: Fungi
- Division: Basidiomycota
- Class: Agaricomycetes
- Order: Agaricales
- Family: Tricholomataceae
- Genus: Tricholoma
- Species: T. brunneicirrus

Binomial name
- Tricholoma brunneicirrus Corner (1994)

Species of fungus

Tricholoma brunneicirrus is an agaric fungus of the genus Tricholoma. Found in Singapore, where it was growing on a dead tree trunk in a forest, it was described as new to science in 1994 by English mycologist E.J.H. Corner.

== See also ==
- List of Tricholoma species
