= Tricholoma primulibrunneum =

Scientific classification
- Kingdom: Fungi
- Division: Basidiomycota
- Class: Agaricomycetes
- Order: Agaricales
- Family: Tricholomataceae
- Genus: Tricholoma
- Species: T. primulibrunneum

Binomial name
- Tricholoma primulibrunneum Corner (1994)

Species of fungus

Tricholoma primulibrunneum is an agaric fungus in the family Tricholomataceae. Found in Sabah, Malaysia, where it grows on humus in Agathis forest, it was described as new to science in 1994 by the English mycologist E. J. H. Corner.

== See also ==
- List of Tricholoma species
