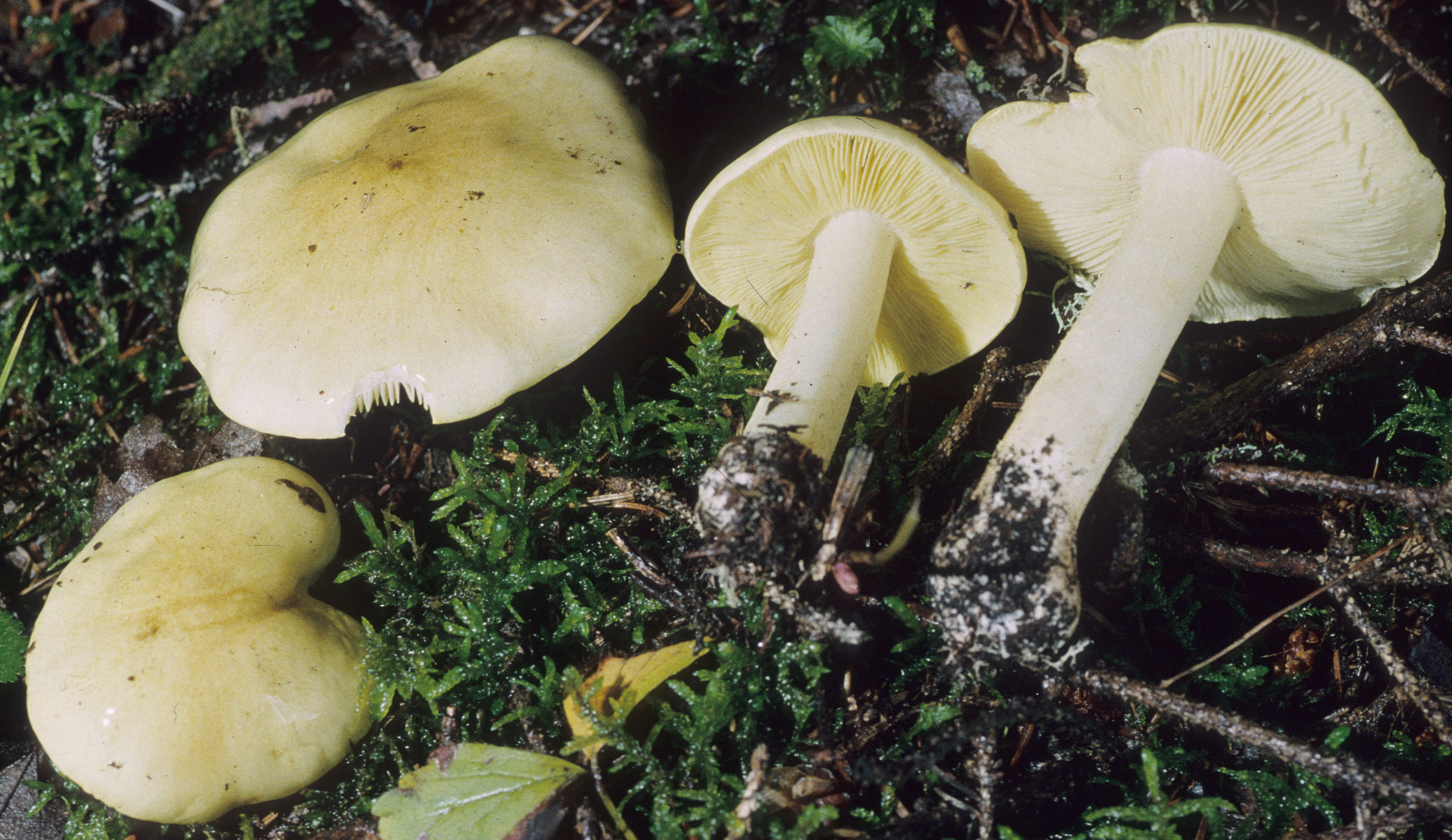

Scientific classification
- Kingdom: Fungi
- Division: Basidiomycota
- Class: Agaricomycetes
- Order: Agaricales
- Family: Tricholomataceae
- Genus: Tricholoma
- Species: T. intermedium

Binomial name
- Tricholoma intermedium Peck (1888)

Synonyms
- Melanoleuca intermedia (Peck) Murrill (1914)

= Tricholoma intermedium =

Species of fungus

Tricholoma intermedium is a mushroom of the agaric genus Tricholoma. It was formally described by American mycologist Charles Horton Peck in 1888.

It has a yellowish cap with a golden-colored center. The cap has a fibrillose to tomentose texture and is about 3-30 centimeters in diameter. The stipe is about 4-12 centimeters long and 0.7-3 centimeters wide, and has a fibrillose texture. It is white to pale yellowish. The gills are whitish in color. They are notched. The mushroom has a farinaceous scent.

Tricholoma equestre is similar but has bright yellow colored gills.

== See also ==
- List of North American Tricholoma
- List of Tricholoma species
