= Tricholoma uropus =

Scientific classification
- Domain: Eukaryota
- Kingdom: Fungi
- Division: Basidiomycota
- Class: Agaricomycetes
- Order: Agaricales
- Family: Tricholomataceae
- Genus: Tricholoma
- Species: T. uropus

Binomial name
- Tricholoma uropus Corner (1994)

Species of fungus

Tricholoma uropus is an agaric fungus of the genus Tricholoma. Found in Singapore, it was described as new to science in 1994 by English mycologist E.J.H. Corner. He described a variety, T. uropus var. majusculum.

== See also ==
- List of Tricholoma species
