= Tricholoma fuscinanum =

Scientific classification
- Domain: Eukaryota
- Kingdom: Fungi
- Division: Basidiomycota
- Class: Agaricomycetes
- Order: Agaricales
- Family: Tricholomataceae
- Genus: Tricholoma
- Species: T. fuscinanum

Binomial name
- Tricholoma fuscinanum Corner (1994)

Species of fungus

Tricholoma fuscinanum is an agaric fungus of the genus Tricholoma. Found in Sabah, Malaysia, it was described as new to science in 1994 by English mycologist E.J.H. Corner.

== See also ==
- List of Tricholoma species
