= Tricholoma stipitirufescens =

Scientific classification
- Domain: Eukaryota
- Kingdom: Fungi
- Division: Basidiomycota
- Class: Agaricomycetes
- Order: Agaricales
- Family: Tricholomataceae
- Genus: Tricholoma
- Species: T. stipitirufescens

Binomial name
- Tricholoma stipitirufescens Corner (1994)

Species of fungus

Tricholoma stipitirufescens is an agaric fungus of the genus Tricholoma. Found in Borneo, where it grows on rotten wood and dead trunks in montane forest, it was described as new to science in 1994 by English mycologist E.J.H. Corner.

== See also ==
- List of Tricholoma species
