= Tricholoma rhizophoreti =

Scientific classification
- Domain: Eukaryota
- Kingdom: Fungi
- Division: Basidiomycota
- Class: Agaricomycetes
- Order: Agaricales
- Family: Tricholomataceae
- Genus: Tricholoma
- Species: T. rhizophoreti

Binomial name
- Tricholoma rhizophoreti Corner (1994)

Species of fungus

Tricholoma rhizophoreti is an agaric fungus of the genus Tricholoma. It is found in Singapore, where it fruits on mud, sticks, roots, and stumps among mangrove trees. It was described as new to science in 1994 by English mycologist E.J.H. Corner.

== See also ==
- List of Tricholoma species
