= Tricholoma dermolomoides =

Scientific classification
- Domain: Eukaryota
- Kingdom: Fungi
- Division: Basidiomycota
- Class: Agaricomycetes
- Order: Agaricales
- Family: Tricholomataceae
- Genus: Tricholoma
- Species: T. dermolomoides

Binomial name
- Tricholoma dermolomoides Corner (1994)

Species of fungus

Tricholoma dermolomoides is an agaric fungus of the genus Tricholoma. Found in Peninsular Malaysia, growing on the soil around of an old termite mound, it was described as new to science in 1994 by English mycologist E.J.H. Corner.

== See also ==
- List of Tricholoma species
