= Tricholoma ferrugineimelleum =

Scientific classification
- Domain: Eukaryota
- Kingdom: Fungi
- Division: Basidiomycota
- Class: Agaricomycetes
- Order: Agaricales
- Family: Tricholomataceae
- Genus: Tricholoma
- Species: T. ferrugineimelleum

Binomial name
- Tricholoma ferrugineimelleum Corner (1994)

Species of fungus

Tricholoma ferrugineimelleum is an agaric fungus of the genus Tricholoma. Found in Peninsular Malaysia, where it grows on the ground in montane forest, it was described as new to science in 1994 by English mycologist E.J.H. Corner.

== See also ==
- List of Tricholoma species
