= Tricholoma subcuneifolium =

Scientific classification
- Domain: Eukaryota
- Kingdom: Fungi
- Division: Basidiomycota
- Class: Agaricomycetes
- Order: Agaricales
- Family: Tricholomataceae
- Genus: Tricholoma
- Species: T. subcuneifolium

Binomial name
- Tricholoma subcuneifolium Corner (1994)

Species of fungus

Tricholoma subcuneifolium is an agaric fungus of the genus Tricholoma. Found in the South Solomons, it was described as new to science in 1994 by English mycologist E.J.H. Corner.

== See also ==
- List of Tricholoma species
