= Tricholoma griseipileatum =

Scientific classification
- Domain: Eukaryota
- Kingdom: Fungi
- Division: Basidiomycota
- Class: Agaricomycetes
- Order: Agaricales
- Family: Tricholomataceae
- Genus: Tricholoma
- Species: T. griseipileatum

Binomial name
- Tricholoma griseipileatum Corner (1994)

Species of fungus

Tricholoma griseipileatum is an agaric fungus of the genus Tricholoma. Found in Peninsular Malaysia, where it grows on humus in montane forest, it was described as new to science in 1994 by English mycologist E.J.H. Corner.

== See also ==
- List of Tricholoma species
