= Tricholoma umbraticum =

Scientific classification
- Domain: Eukaryota
- Kingdom: Fungi
- Division: Basidiomycota
- Class: Agaricomycetes
- Order: Agaricales
- Family: Tricholomataceae
- Genus: Tricholoma
- Species: T. umbraticum

Binomial name
- Tricholoma umbraticum Corner (1994)

Species of fungus

Tricholoma umbraticum is an agaric fungus of the genus Tricholoma. Found in Sarawak, it was described as new to science in 1994 by English mycologist E.J.H. Corner.

== See also ==
- List of Tricholoma species
