= Tricholoma microcarpoides =

Scientific classification
- Kingdom: Fungi
- Division: Basidiomycota
- Class: Agaricomycetes
- Order: Agaricales
- Family: Tricholomataceae
- Genus: Tricholoma
- Species: T. microcarpoides

Binomial name
- Tricholoma microcarpoides Corner (1994)

Species of fungus

Tricholoma microcarpoides is an agaric fungus of the genus Tricholoma. Found in Singapore, it was described as new to science in 1994 by English mycologist E.J.H. Corner.

== See also ==
- List of Tricholoma species
