= Tricholoma parvisporum =

Scientific classification
- Domain: Eukaryota
- Kingdom: Fungi
- Division: Basidiomycota
- Class: Agaricomycetes
- Order: Agaricales
- Family: Tricholomataceae
- Genus: Tricholoma
- Species: T. parvisporum

Binomial name
- Tricholoma parvisporum Corner (1994)

Species of fungus

Tricholoma parvisporum is an agaric fungus of the genus Tricholoma. It is found in Peninsular Malaysia, where it grows on the ground in secondary forests. It was described as new to science in 1994 by English mycologist E.J.H. Corner.

== See also ==
- List of Tricholoma species
