= Tricholoma bambusarum =

Scientific classification
- Domain: Eukaryota
- Kingdom: Fungi
- Division: Basidiomycota
- Class: Agaricomycetes
- Order: Agaricales
- Family: Tricholomataceae
- Genus: Tricholoma
- Species: T. bambusarum

Binomial name
- Tricholoma bambusarum Corner (1994)

Species of fungus

Tricholoma bambusarum is an agaric fungus of the genus Tricholoma. Found in Peninsular Malaysia, where it grows on the ground under bamboo, it was described as new to science in 1994 by English mycologist E.J.H. Corner.

== See also ==
- List of Tricholoma species
