= Tricholoma betilonganum =

Scientific classification
- Domain: Eukaryota
- Kingdom: Fungi
- Division: Basidiomycota
- Class: Agaricomycetes
- Order: Agaricales
- Family: Tricholomataceae
- Genus: Tricholoma
- Species: T. betilonganum

Binomial name
- Tricholoma betilonganum Corner (1994)

Species of fungus

Tricholoma betilonganum is an agaric fungus of the genus Tricholoma. Found in the South Solomons, it was described as new to science in 1994 by English mycologist E.J.H. Corner.

== See also ==
- List of Tricholoma species
