= Tricholoma tenacifolium =

Scientific classification
- Domain: Eukaryota
- Kingdom: Fungi
- Division: Basidiomycota
- Class: Agaricomycetes
- Order: Agaricales
- Family: Tricholomataceae
- Genus: Tricholoma
- Species: T. tenacifolium

Binomial name
- Tricholoma tenacifolium Corner (1994)

Species of fungus

Tricholoma tenacifolium is an agaric fungus of the genus Tricholoma. Found in Peninsular Malaysia, it was described as new to science in 1994 by English mycologist E.J.H. Corner.

== See also ==
- List of Tricholoma species
