= Tricholoma crepidotoides =

Scientific classification
- Domain: Eukaryota
- Kingdom: Fungi
- Division: Basidiomycota
- Class: Agaricomycetes
- Order: Agaricales
- Family: Tricholomataceae
- Genus: Tricholoma
- Species: T. crepidotoides

Binomial name
- Tricholoma crepidotoides Corner (1994)

Species of fungus

Tricholoma crepidotoides is an agaric fungus of the genus Tricholoma. Found in Peninsular Malaysia, where it grows on rotting wood, it was described as new to science in 1994 by English mycologist E.J.H. Corner.

== See also ==
- List of Tricholoma species
