= Tricholoma aeruginascens =

Scientific classification
- Domain: Eukaryota
- Kingdom: Fungi
- Division: Basidiomycota
- Class: Agaricomycetes
- Order: Agaricales
- Family: Tricholomataceae
- Genus: Tricholoma
- Species: T. aeruginascens

Binomial name
- Tricholoma aeruginascens Corner (1994)

Species of fungus

Tricholoma aeruginascens is an agaric fungus of the genus Tricholoma. It is found in Peninsular Malaysia, where it grows on the ground in secondary forests. It was described as new to science in 1994 by English mycologist E.J.H. Corner.

== See also ==
- List of Tricholoma species
