= Tricholoma villosiparvum =

Scientific classification
- Domain: Eukaryota
- Kingdom: Fungi
- Division: Basidiomycota
- Class: Agaricomycetes
- Order: Agaricales
- Family: Tricholomataceae
- Genus: Tricholoma
- Species: T. villosiparvum

Binomial name
- Tricholoma villosiparvum Corner (1994)

Species of fungus

Tricholoma villosiparvum is an agaric fungus of the genus Tricholoma. Found in Sabah, Malaysia, it was described as new to science in 1994 by the English mycologist E.J.H. Corner.

== See also ==
- List of Tricholoma species
