= Tricholoma rugulicinctum =

Scientific classification
- Domain: Eukaryota
- Kingdom: Fungi
- Division: Basidiomycota
- Class: Agaricomycetes
- Order: Agaricales
- Family: Tricholomataceae
- Genus: Tricholoma
- Species: T. rugulicinctum

Binomial name
- Tricholoma rugulicinctum Corner (1994)

Species of fungus

Tricholoma rugulicinctum is an agaric fungus of the genus Tricholoma. Found in Peninsular Malaysia, it was described as new to science in 1994 by English mycologist E.J.H. Corner.

== See also ==
- List of Tricholoma species
