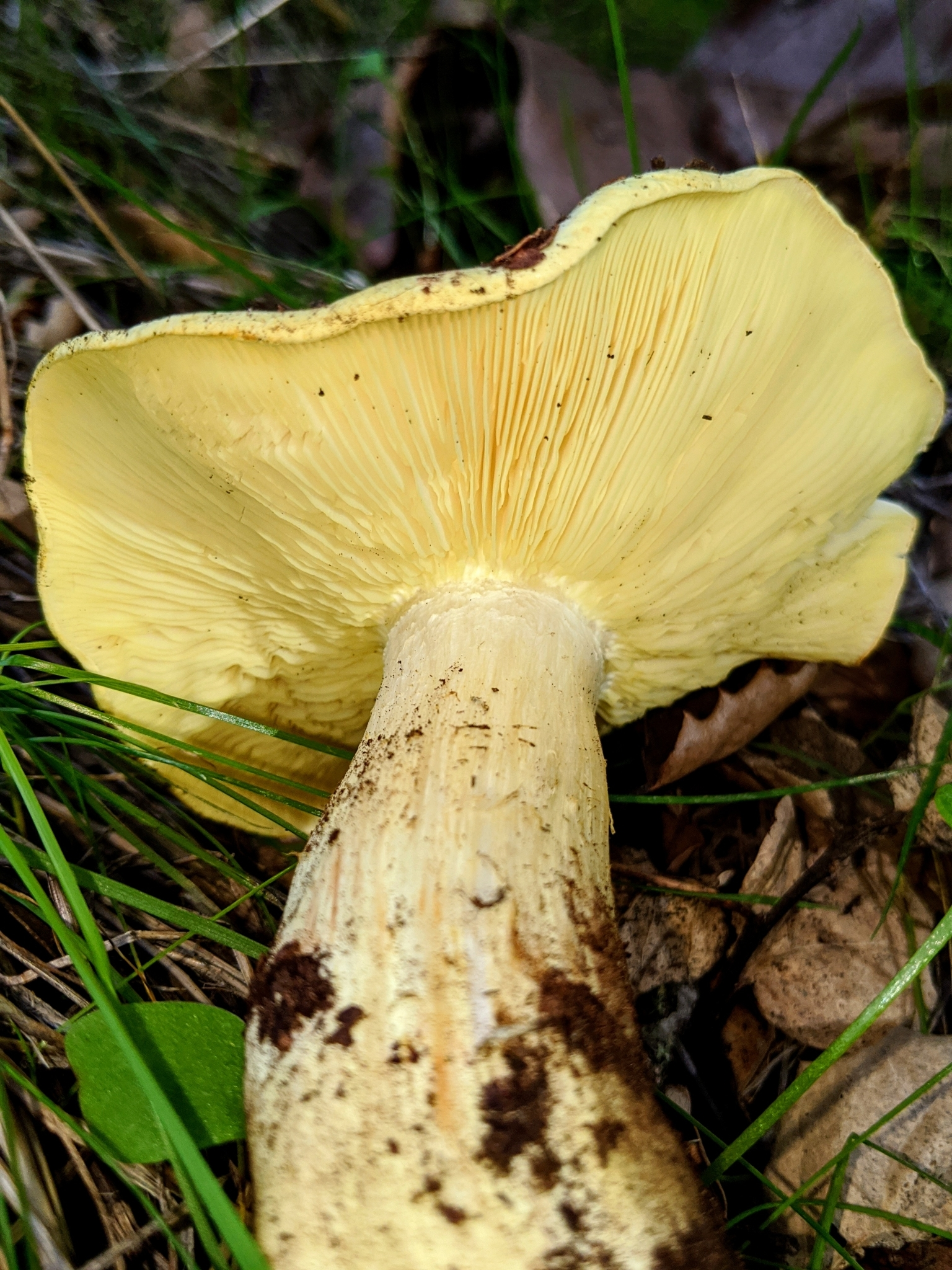
- San Luis Obispo County, California, 2020

Scientific classification
- Domain: Eukaryota
- Kingdom: Fungi
- Division: Basidiomycota
- Class: Agaricomycetes
- Order: Agaricales
- Family: Tricholomataceae
- Genus: Tricholoma
- Species: T. yatesii

Binomial name
- Tricholoma yatesii Murrill

Synonyms
- Melanoleuca yatesii

= Tricholoma yatesii =

Species of fungus

Tricholoma yatesii is a species of gilled mushroom. Index Fungorum and Mycobank state that the current official name of this species is Melanoleuca yatesii. It is extremely similar to Tricholoma equestre but it grows in mycorrhizal association with Quercus (oak trees and shrubs) rather than with Pinus. T. yatesii is a California mushroom, with a handful of observations from Oregon and Washington. In general it is currently "not possible to provide complete or definitive coverage of Tricholoma" in North America, so T. yatesii (and cousins) remain comparatively poorly known to both science and the general public.

William A. Murrill's original description (of what was then called Melanoleuca yatesii) was "Pileus regular, convex, solitary, 5-8 cm. broad; surface smooth, glabrous, viscid, sulfur-yellow, becoming brownish at the center on drying, margin concolorous, entire, incurved on drying; context rather thin, white to pale-yellow; lamellae sinuate-adnexed, rather broad, ventricose, not crowded, apparently pale-yellow when fresh, somewhat discolored on drying; spores ellipsoid, smooth, hyaline, 5X3 μ; stipe equal, shining, subglabrous, sulfur-yellow, becoming nearly white when dry, 6-10 cm long, 8-12 mm thick." Tricholoma yatesii is named after H. S. Yates, who collected the type species under introduced eucalyptus and endemic Monterey cypress in Berkeley, California.

== See also ==
- List of Tricholoma species
