= Tricholoma penangense =

Scientific classification
- Domain: Eukaryota
- Kingdom: Fungi
- Division: Basidiomycota
- Class: Agaricomycetes
- Order: Agaricales
- Family: Tricholomataceae
- Genus: Tricholoma
- Species: T. penangense

Binomial name
- Tricholoma penangense Corner (1994)

Species of fungus

Tricholoma penangense is an agaric fungus of the genus Tricholoma. Found in Peninsular Malaysia, it was described as new to science in 1994 by English mycologist E.J.H. Corner.

== See also ==
- List of Tricholoma species
