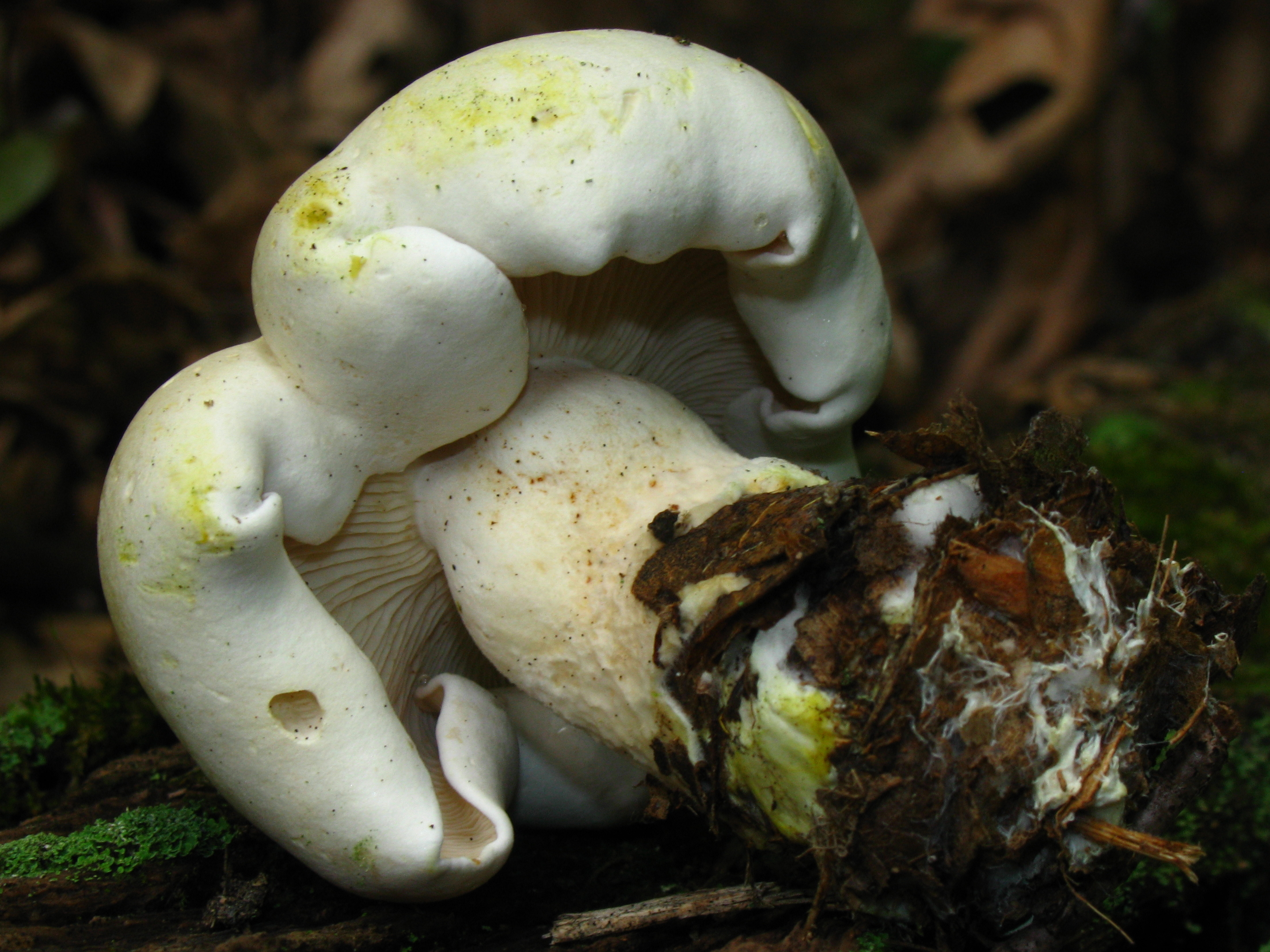

Scientific classification
- Domain: Eukaryota
- Kingdom: Fungi
- Division: Basidiomycota
- Class: Agaricomycetes
- Order: Agaricales
- Family: Tricholomataceae
- Genus: Tricholoma
- Species: T. sulphurescens

Binomial name
- Tricholoma sulphurescens Bres. (1905)

= Tricholoma sulphurescens =

Species of fungus

Tricholoma sulphurescens is a mushroom of the agaric genus Tricholoma. It was first formally described by Italian mycologist Giacomo Bresadola in 1905. It is found in Europe and northeastern North America.

== See also ==
- List of North American Tricholoma
- List of Tricholoma species
