= Tricholoma khakicolor =

Scientific classification
- Domain: Eukaryota
- Kingdom: Fungi
- Division: Basidiomycota
- Class: Agaricomycetes
- Order: Agaricales
- Family: Tricholomataceae
- Genus: Tricholoma
- Species: T. khakicolor

Binomial name
- Tricholoma khakicolor Corner (1994)

Species of fungus

Tricholoma khakicolor is an agaric fungus of the genus Tricholoma. Found in Peninsular Malaysia, it was described as new to science in 1994 by English mycologist E.J.H. Corner.

== See also ==
- List of Tricholoma species
