= Tricholoma violaceibrunneum =

Scientific classification
- Domain: Eukaryota
- Kingdom: Fungi
- Division: Basidiomycota
- Class: Agaricomycetes
- Order: Agaricales
- Family: Tricholomataceae
- Genus: Tricholoma
- Species: T. violaceibrunneum

Binomial name
- Tricholoma violaceibrunneum Corner (1994)

Species of fungus

Tricholoma violaceibrunneum is an agaric fungus of the genus Tricholoma. Found in Peninsular Malaysia, it was described as new to science in 1994 by English mycologist E.J.H. Corner.

== See also ==
- List of Tricholoma species
