= Tricholoma furcatifolium =

Scientific classification
- Domain: Eukaryota
- Kingdom: Fungi
- Division: Basidiomycota
- Class: Agaricomycetes
- Order: Agaricales
- Family: Tricholomataceae
- Genus: Tricholoma
- Species: T. furcatifolium

Binomial name
- Tricholoma furcatifolium Corner (1994)

Species of fungus

Tricholoma furcatifolium is an agaric fungus of the genus Tricholoma. Found in Singapore, where it grows in the forest on humus, it was described as new to science in 1994 by English mycologist E.J.H. Corner.

== See also ==
- List of Tricholoma species
