= Tricholoma singaporense =

Scientific classification
- Domain: Eukaryota
- Kingdom: Fungi
- Division: Basidiomycota
- Class: Agaricomycetes
- Order: Agaricales
- Family: Tricholomataceae
- Genus: Tricholoma
- Species: T. singaporense

Binomial name
- Tricholoma singaporense Corner (1994)

Species of fungus

Tricholoma singaporense is an agaric fungus of the genus Tricholoma. Found in Singapore, it was described as new to science in 1994 by English mycologist E.J.H. Corner.

== See also ==
- List of Tricholoma species
