= Tricholoma borneomurinum =

Scientific classification
- Domain: Eukaryota
- Kingdom: Fungi
- Division: Basidiomycota
- Class: Agaricomycetes
- Order: Agaricales
- Family: Tricholomataceae
- Genus: Tricholoma
- Species: T. borneomurinum

Binomial name
- Tricholoma borneomurinum Corner (1994)

Species of fungus

Tricholoma borneomurinum is an agaric fungus of the genus Tricholoma. It is found in Sabah, Malaysia, where it grows in humus of montane forests. It was described as new to science in 1994 by English mycologist E.J.H. Corner.

== See also ==
- List of Tricholoma species
