= Tricholoma cutifractum =

Scientific classification
- Domain: Eukaryota
- Kingdom: Fungi
- Division: Basidiomycota
- Class: Agaricomycetes
- Order: Agaricales
- Family: Tricholomataceae
- Genus: Tricholoma
- Species: T. cutifractum

Binomial name
- Tricholoma cutifractum Corner (1994)

Species of fungus

Tricholoma cutifractum is an agaric fungus of the genus Tricholoma. Found in the forests of Singapore, it was described as new to science in 1994 by English mycologist E.J.H. Corner.

== See also ==
- List of Tricholoma species
