= Tricholoma atroscriptum =

Scientific classification
- Domain: Eukaryota
- Kingdom: Fungi
- Division: Basidiomycota
- Class: Agaricomycetes
- Order: Agaricales
- Family: Tricholomataceae
- Genus: Tricholoma
- Species: T. atroscriptum

Binomial name
- Tricholoma atroscriptum Corner (1994)

Species of fungus

Tricholoma atroscriptum is an agaric fungus of the genus Tricholoma. Found in Sabah, Malaysia, it was described as new to science in 1994 by English mycologist E.J.H. Corner.

== See also ==
- List of Tricholoma species
