= Tricholoma triste =

Scientific classification
- Kingdom: Fungi
- Division: Basidiomycota
- Class: Agaricomycetes
- Order: Agaricales
- Family: Tricholomataceae
- Genus: Tricholoma
- Species: T. triste

Binomial name
- Tricholoma triste (Scopoli) Quél (1872)

Synonyms
- Agaricus tristis Scopoli (1774)

Species of fungus

Tricholoma triste
- Mycological characteristics
- Gills on hymenium
- Cap is convex
- Hymenium is sinuate
- Stipe is bare
- Spore print is white
- Ecology is mycorrhizal

Tricholoma triste is a species of mushroom in the family Tricholomataceae. It is found in Europe, North America, China, and Pakistan.

== Taxonomy ==
Tricholoma triste was first described in 1772 by Giovanni Antonio Scopoli as Agaricus tristis. In 1872, Lucien Quélet transferred it to the genus Tricholoma.

== Description ==
The cap of Tricholoma triste is gray in color and about 1-4 centimeters in diameter. It is fibrillose. The stipe is whitish to light gray, and about 2-6 centimeters long and 0.4-1 centimeters wide. The gills are white to grayish in color. They are notched. The spore print is white.

=== Similar species ===
Tricholoma triste is genetically very similar to T. moseri. T. bonii is also genetically similar. It is also similar in appearance. One source considers T. triste and T. moseri to be synonyms.
