= Tricholoma permelleum =

Scientific classification
- Domain: Eukaryota
- Kingdom: Fungi
- Division: Basidiomycota
- Class: Agaricomycetes
- Order: Agaricales
- Family: Tricholomataceae
- Genus: Tricholoma
- Species: T. permelleum

Binomial name
- Tricholoma permelleum Corner (1994)

Species of fungus

Tricholoma permelleum is an agaric fungus of the genus Tricholoma. It is found in Peninsular Malaysia, where it fruits on soil, fallen trunks, and bamboo stumps. It was described as new to science in 1994 by English mycologist E.J.H. Corner.

== See also ==
- List of Tricholoma species
