= Tricholoma minutissimum =

Scientific classification
- Domain: Eukaryota
- Kingdom: Fungi
- Division: Basidiomycota
- Class: Agaricomycetes
- Order: Agaricales
- Family: Tricholomataceae
- Genus: Tricholoma
- Species: T. minutissimum

Binomial name
- Tricholoma minutissimum Corner (1994)

Species of fungus

Tricholoma minutissimum is an agaric fungus of the genus Tricholoma. Found in the South Solomons, it was described as new to science in 1994 by English mycologist E.J.H. Corner.

== See also ==
- List of Tricholoma species
