= Tricholoma fissilifolium =

Scientific classification
- Domain: Eukaryota
- Kingdom: Fungi
- Division: Basidiomycota
- Class: Agaricomycetes
- Order: Agaricales
- Family: Tricholomataceae
- Genus: Tricholoma
- Species: T. fissilifolium

Binomial name
- Tricholoma fissilifolium Corner (1994)

Species of fungus

Tricholoma fissilifolium is an agaric fungus of the genus Tricholoma. Found in Singapore, where it grows on rotting wood in forests, it was described as new to science in 1994 by English mycologist E.J.H. Corner.

== See also ==
- List of Tricholoma species
