= Tricholoma purpureiflavum =

Scientific classification
- Domain: Eukaryota
- Kingdom: Fungi
- Division: Basidiomycota
- Class: Agaricomycetes
- Order: Agaricales
- Family: Tricholomataceae
- Genus: Tricholoma
- Species: T. purpureiflavum

Binomial name
- Tricholoma purpureiflavum Corner (1994)

Species of fungus

Tricholoma purpureiflavum is an agaric fungus of the genus Tricholoma. Found in Sabah, Malaysia, it was described as new to science in 1994 by English mycologist E.J.H. Corner.

== See also ==
- List of Tricholoma species
