= Tricholoma busuense =

Scientific classification
- Kingdom: Fungi
- Division: Basidiomycota
- Class: Agaricomycetes
- Order: Agaricales
- Family: Tricholomataceae
- Genus: Tricholoma
- Species: T. busuense

Binomial name
- Tricholoma busuense Corner (1994)

Species of fungus

Tricholoma busuense is an agaric fungus of the genus Tricholoma. Found in Papua New Guinea, it was described as new to science in 1994 by English mycologist E.J.H. Corner.

== See also ==
- List of Tricholoma species
