= Tricholoma platyphyllum =

Scientific classification
- Kingdom: Fungi
- Division: Basidiomycota
- Class: Agaricomycetes
- Order: Agaricales
- Family: Tricholomataceae
- Genus: Tricholoma
- Species: T. platyphyllum

Binomial name
- Tricholoma platyphyllum (Murrill) Murrill (1913)

Synonyms
- Melanoleuca platyphylla Murrill (1913)

Species of fungus

Tricholoma platyphyllum
- Mycological characteristics
- Gills on hymenium
- Cap is convex or flat
- Hymenium is sinuate
- Stipe is bare
- Spore print is white
- Ecology is mycorrhizal
- Edibility is inedible or poisonous

Tricholoma platyphyllum, commonly known as the white stinky trich, is a species of mushroom in the family Tricholomataceae.

== Taxonomy ==
Tricholoma platyphyllum was first described by William Murrill in 1913 as Melanoleuca platyphylla. Later that year, Murrill transferred it to the genus Tricholoma.

== Description ==
The cap of Tricholoma platyphyllum is white or cream to pale tan in color. It can be convex or flat, and it is about 1.5-5 centimeters in diameter. The stipe is also white in color, and it has a fibrillose to smooth texture. It is about 4-12 centimeters long and 3-8 millimeters wide. The gills are white as well, though they can be pale tan colored in older specimens. They are notched. The spore print is white. The mushroom has a distinctive odor, described as being similar to mothballs, paperwhite, or coal gas. Despite this, the odor is not mentioned in Murrill's description.

=== Similar species ===
Tricholoma platyphyllum is very similar to T. inamoneum, but that species grows farther north than T. platyphyllum. It also grows under spruce. T. sulphureum has a similar odor to both T. platyphyllum and T. inamoneum, but it has a yellow color.

== Habitat and distribution ==
Tricholoma platyphyllum is found in the Pacific Northwest, where it grows under conifers. Its range extends from California to Washington. It was originally described from Washington.
