= Tricholoma panicolor =

Scientific classification
- Domain: Eukaryota
- Kingdom: Fungi
- Division: Basidiomycota
- Class: Agaricomycetes
- Order: Agaricales
- Family: Tricholomataceae
- Genus: Tricholoma
- Species: T. panicolor

Binomial name
- Tricholoma panicolor Corner (1994)

Species of fungus

Tricholoma panicolor is an agaric fungus of the genus Tricholoma. Found in the South Solomons, it was described as new to science in 1994 by English mycologist E.J.H. Corner.

== See also ==
- List of Tricholoma species
