= Tricholoma megalophaeum =

Scientific classification
- Kingdom: Fungi
- Division: Basidiomycota
- Class: Agaricomycetes
- Order: Agaricales
- Family: Tricholomataceae
- Genus: Tricholoma
- Species: T. megalophaeum

Binomial name
- Tricholoma megalophaeum N. Siegel, S.A. Trudell & A.D. Parker (2021)

Species of fungus

Tricholoma megalophaeum
- Mycological characteristics
- Gills on hymenium
- Cap is conical or umbonate
- Hymenium is sinuate
- Stipe is bare
- Spore print is white
- Ecology is mycorrhizal
- Edibility is unknown or poisonous

Tricholoma megalophaeum, commonly known as the big dark trich, is a species of mushroom in the family Tricholomataceae. It was first described from California in 2021.

== Description ==
The cap of Tricholoma megalophaeum is grayish in color. It starts out conical and becomes broadly conical, convex, or umbonate as the mushroom matures. It is about 5-15 centimeters in diameter. The stipe is whitish to yellowish in color. It is 1-15 centimeters long and 1-5 centimeters wide. It has a bulbous base. The gills are notched and whitish in color. The scent can be similar to green corn or farinaceous.

== Habitat and distribution ==
Tricholoma megalophaeum is found in Washington and California. It grows with spruce near the coast.
