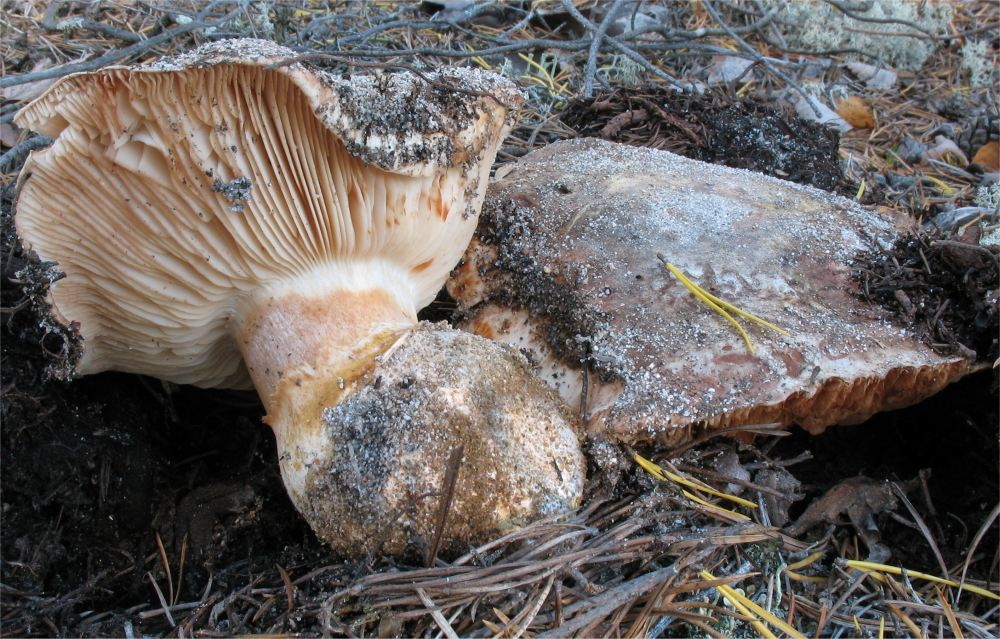

Conservation status
- Vulnerable (IUCN 3.1)

Scientific classification
- Kingdom: Fungi
- Division: Basidiomycota
- Class: Agaricomycetes
- Order: Agaricales
- Family: Tricholomataceae
- Genus: Tricholoma
- Species: T. colossus

Binomial name
- Tricholoma colossus (Fr.) Quél. (1872)

Synonyms
- Agaricus colossus Fr. (1836); Gyrophila colossus (Fr.) Quél. (1886); Armillaria colossus (Fr.) Boud. (1900); Megatricholoma colossus (Fr.) G.Kost (1984)

= Tricholoma colossus =

Giant Knight

Species of fungus

Tricholoma colossus, commonly known as Giant Knight, is a mushroom of the agaric genus Tricholoma. Due to its ringed foot, it was previously classified as Armillaria, even though it is otherwise clearly Tricholoma. The cap is 6–30 cm wide, brick red to chestnut brown, hemispherical when young, widening later on, uneven, always with very thick flesh, surface slightly sticky, developing somewhat into scales. The stipe is thick, 2–5 (at the stem up to 10) cm thick, solid. Ring-like formation at the top of the foot, above which it is white. It is considered a very rare mushroom that grows in association with pine trees.

== See also ==
- List of North American Tricholoma
- List of Tricholoma species
