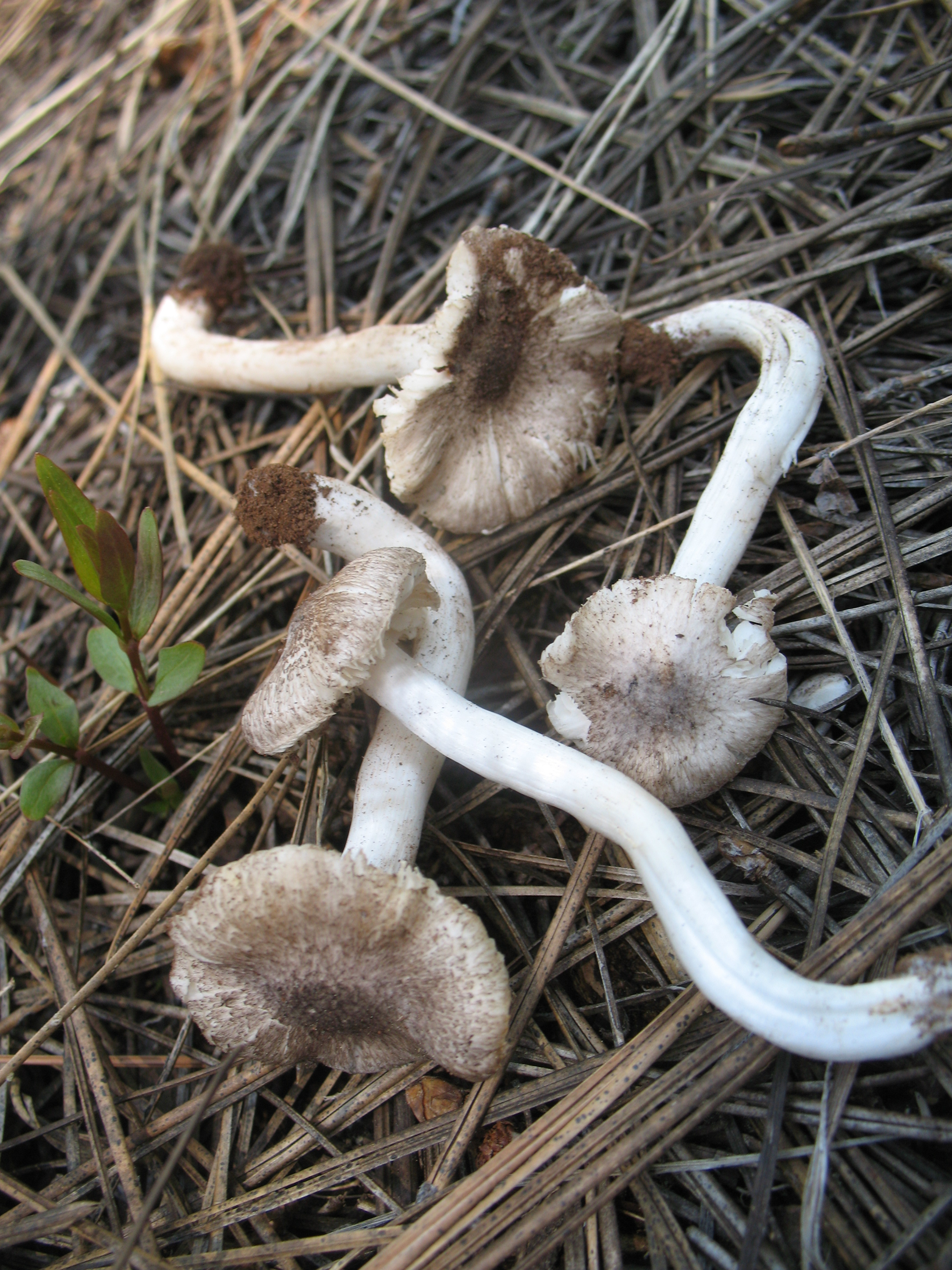

Scientific classification
- Domain: Eukaryota
- Kingdom: Fungi
- Division: Basidiomycota
- Class: Agaricomycetes
- Order: Agaricales
- Family: Tricholomataceae
- Genus: Tricholoma
- Species: T. moseri

Binomial name
- Tricholoma moseri Singer (1989)

= Tricholoma moseri =

Species of fungus

Tricholoma moseri is a mushroom of the agaric genus Tricholoma. It was first formally described in 1989 by Rolf Singer.

It was named after Meinhard Michael Moser, an Austrian mycologist.

== See also ==
- List of North American Tricholoma
- List of Tricholoma species
