= Tricholoma atrofibrillosum =

Scientific classification
- Kingdom: Fungi
- Division: Basidiomycota
- Class: Agaricomycetes
- Order: Agaricales
- Family: Tricholomataceae
- Genus: Tricholoma
- Species: T. atrofibrillosum

Binomial name
- Tricholoma atrofibrillosum S.A. Trudell, A.D. Parker & E.T. Cline (2021)

Species of fungus

Tricholoma atrofibrillosum
- Mycological characteristics
- Gills on hymenium
- Cap is umbonate
- Hymenium is sinuate
- Stipe is bare
- Spore print is white
- Ecology is mycorrhizal
- Edibility is unknown or poisonous

Tricholoma atrofibrillosum, commonly known as the green-streaked trich, is a species of mushroom in the family Tricholomataceae. It was first described in 2021. It is found in the Pacific Northwest.

== Description ==
The cap of Tricholoma atrofibrillosum is brownish, yellowish, or greenish in color, and has a fibrillose texture. It is about 3-8 centimeters in diameter. It starts out conical and becomes convex to flat with an umbo in age. It is slightly slimy. The stipe is dry and ranges in color from whitish to greenish yellow. It has a fibrous texture. The gills are notched, though they sometimes appear free. They are off-white to yellowish green in color.

=== Similar species ===
Tricholoma atrofibrillosum has several lookalikes. One of them, T. sejunctum, grows in Europe and was previously thought to occur in the Pacific Northwest until it was discovered that the specimens in the Pacific Northwest were actually T. atrofibrillosum. T. viridilutescens is also similar, but like T. sejunctum, it grows in Europe.

== Habitat and distribution ==
Tricholoma atrofibrillosum is found in the Pacific Northwest, and was originally described from Alaska. It grows in coniferous forests. It often grows under fir and hemlock, though it can also grow under spruce.
