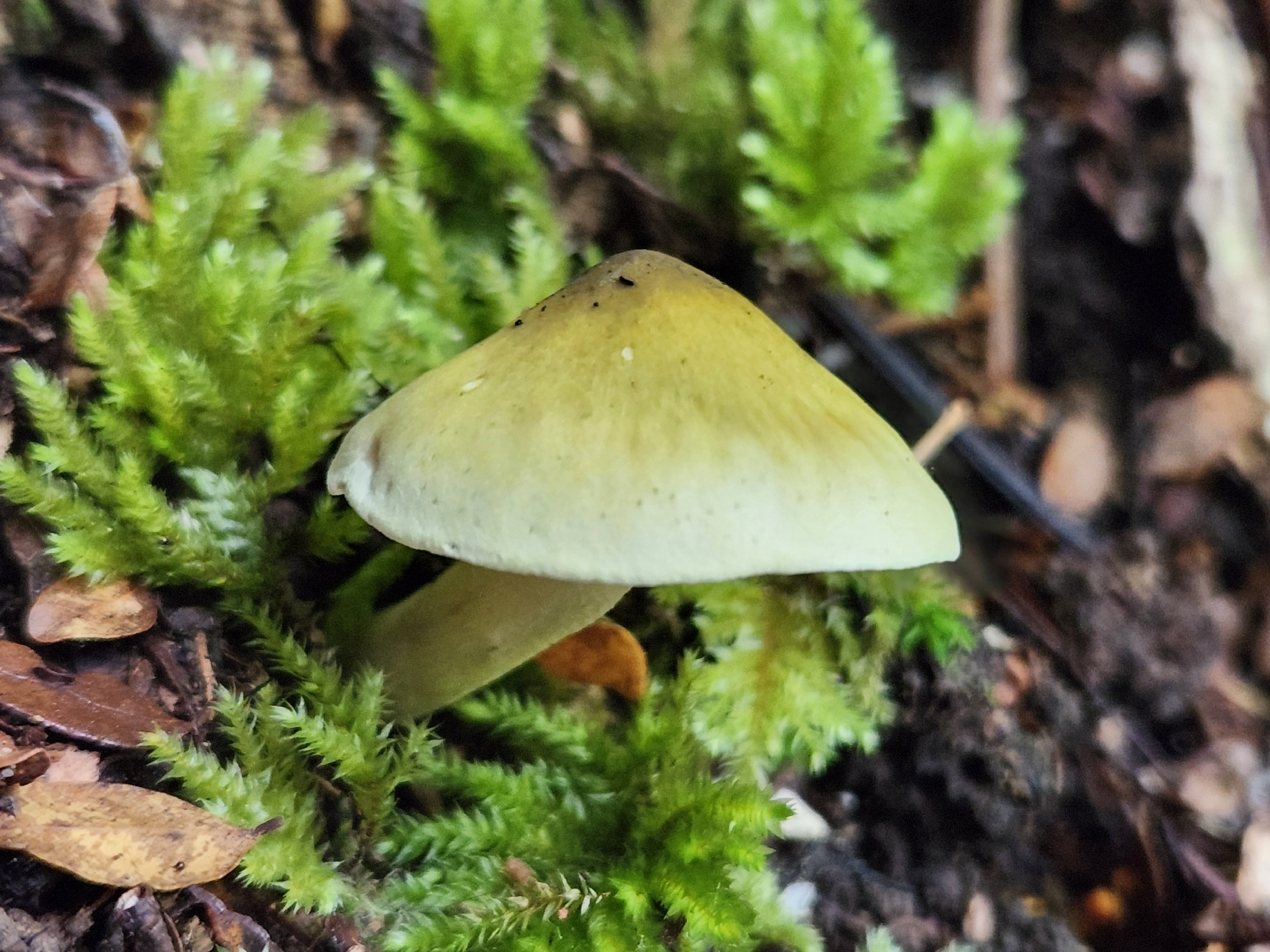
- Tricholoma viridiolivaceum fruiting body

Scientific classification
- Kingdom: Fungi
- Division: Basidiomycota
- Class: Agaricomycetes
- Order: Agaricales
- Family: Tricholomataceae
- Genus: Tricholoma
- Species: T. viridiolivaceum

Binomial name
- Tricholoma viridiolivaceum G.Stev. (1964)

= Tricholoma viridiolivaceum =

Species of fungus

Tricholoma viridiolivaceum
- Mycological characteristics
- Gills on hymenium
- Cap is convex or flat
- Hymenium is sinuate
- Stipe has a ring or is bare
- Spore print is white
- Ecology is mycorrhizal
- Edibility is unknown

Tricholoma viridiolivaceum is a species of mushroom of the family Tricholomataceae. It was first described by the New Zealand mycologist Greta Stevenson in 1964. The fungus is endemic to New Zealand, where it is found in ectomycorrhizal associations with Nothofagus trees. The fruiting bodies are noted for having an olive-green colour in the centre of the pileus (cap), and for having a strong fishy smell.

== Taxonomy ==
The species was first described by the New Zealand mycologist Greta Stevenson in 1964. T. viridiolivaceum is categorised in the section Rigida of the genus Tricholoma.

== Description ==
The fruit bodies (basidiocarps) of T. viridiolivaceum have caps (pilei) which reach 3–8 centimetres (1.2–3.1 inches) in diameter. They are characterised by the olive-green colour in the centre. They are convex with a downward-curved edge, later becoming irregularly flat. The surface is moist and smooth when fresh, but becomes slightly fibrous as it dries. The flesh is dull white. The lamella (gills) are a creamy white colour and can later become dull pink. They are sinuate and moderately distant. The stipe measures 3–8 × 3–5 cm in length and width. It can have traces of a fibrillose ring. It is creamy in colour above the ring, and olive-green below. The spore print is white. The spores are thin-walled and measure 6–7 × 4–5 μm. The hyphae can measure 5 μm in diameter. The mushrooms are noted for having a strong fishy smell.

== Distribution and habitat ==
Tricholoma viridiolivaceum is endemic to New Zealand. The fungus is found in ectomycorrhizal associations with Nothofagus trees, and may possibly also be associated with Leptospermum species.
