= Tricholoma subacutum =

Scientific classification
- Kingdom: Fungi
- Division: Basidiomycota
- Class: Agaricomycetes
- Order: Agaricales
- Family: Tricholomataceae
- Genus: Tricholoma
- Species: T. subacutum

Binomial name
- Tricholoma subacutum Peck (1889)

Species of fungus

Tricholoma subacutum
- Mycological characteristics
- Gills on hymenium
- Cap is umbonate
- Hymenium is sinuate
- Stipe is bare
- Spore print is white
- Ecology is mycorrhizal
- Edibility is unknown or poisonous

Tricholoma subacutum, commonly known as the silver streak, is a species of mushroom in the family Tricholomataceae. It was first described by Charles Horton Peck in 1889.

== Description ==
The cap of Tricholoma subacutum is 4-10 centimeters in diameter. It starts out conical and expands to convex or plane in age. It is umbonate. It is gray in color and has a fibrillose texture. The stipe is about 7-15 centimeters long and 1-2 centimeters wide. It is white in color and is often swollen in the middle. It sometimes has a bulbous base. The gills are notched, and whitish to grayish in color. The spore print is white. The taste is bitter and slowly becomes acrid. However, it is distinct from that of Russula species.

=== Similar species ===
Tricholoma subacutum is very similar to T. virgatum, but that species occurs in Europe. For a long time, collections of T. subacutum from the Pacific Northwest were classified as T. virgatum, but they are now considered to be T. subacutum, as the latter is known to occur in North America, but the former is not. T. acre is also similar, but it grows under hardwoods and may or may not be found in the Pacific Northwest.

== Habitat and distribution ==
Tricholoma subacutum is found in North America. It was originally described from New York, and can also be found in the Pacific Northwest. It grows in coniferous forests and fruits during fall.
