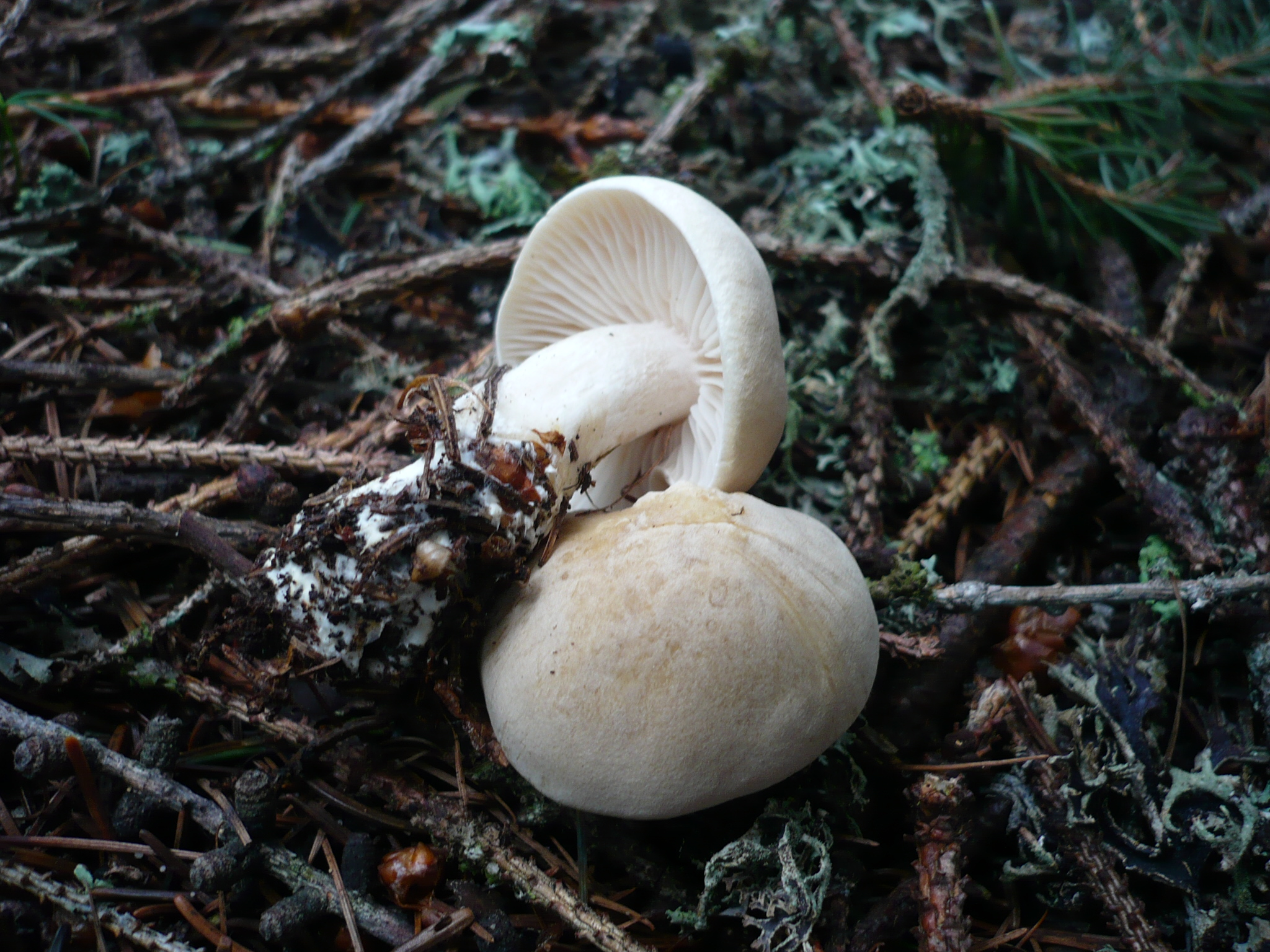

Scientific classification
- Domain: Eukaryota
- Kingdom: Fungi
- Division: Basidiomycota
- Class: Agaricomycetes
- Order: Agaricales
- Family: Tricholomataceae
- Genus: Tricholoma
- Species: T. inamoenum

Binomial name
- Tricholoma inamoenum (Fr.) Gillet (1878)

Synonyms
- Agaricus inamoenus Fr. (1815); Gyrophila inamoenum (Fr.) Quél. (1888)

= Tricholoma inamoenum =

Species of fungus

Tricholoma inamoenum is a mushroom of the agaric genus Tricholoma found through the Northern Hemisphere, particularly under conifers. It is poisonous, and is characterized by an unpleasant odor resembling coal gas or tar. • Analysis of the volatile compounds emanating from fresh sporocarps using solid phase microextraction (SPME) showed the odor compounds responsible for the coal tar odor of this mushroom are 1-octen-3-ol and indole.

Seattle's Tricholoma platyphyllum may be the same species. A similar species is Tricholoma sulphureum, which is found under both conifers and hardwoods.

== See also ==
- List of North American Tricholoma
- List of Tricholoma species
