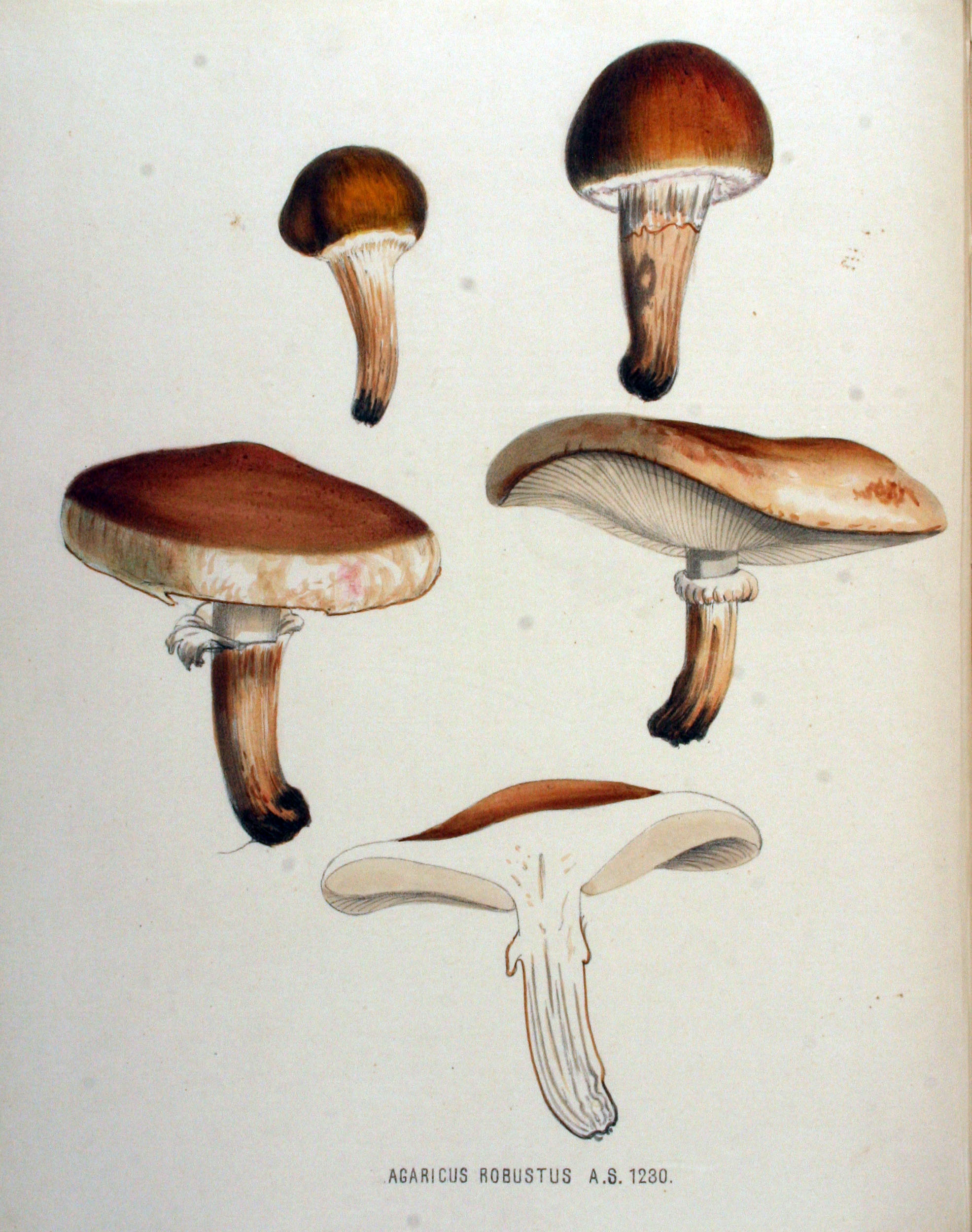

Scientific classification
- Kingdom: Fungi
- Division: Basidiomycota
- Class: Agaricomycetes
- Order: Agaricales
- Family: Tricholomataceae
- Genus: Tricholoma
- Species: T. robustum

Binomial name
- Tricholoma robustum (Alb. & Schwein.) Ricken 1915

Synonyms
- Agaricus robustus Alb. & Schwein.; Armillaria robusta (Alb. & Schwein.) Gillet; Armillaria robusta var. major Sacc.; Armillaria robusta var. minor Sacc.; Gyrophila robusta (Alb. & Schwein.) Quél.; Mastoleucomyces robustus (Alb. & Schwein.) Kuntze

= Tricholoma robustum =

Species of fungus

Tricholoma robustum
- Mycological characteristics
- Gills on hymenium
- Cap is convex
- Hymenium is adnexed
- Stipe has a ring
- Ecology is mycorrhizal
- Edibility is edible

Tricholoma robustum is an edible mycorrhizal mushroom in the family Tricholomataceae. In Japan it is called matsutake-modoki (pseudo-matsutake), and colloquially referred to as obasan no matsutake ("old lady's matsutake"), because it resembles matsutake mushroom while being smaller and less aromatic.

== Description ==
Resembles matsutake, but the fruiting bodies are much smaller in size. The cap is 4–10 cm, convex or flat of uneven reddish-brown color, with small, often upright scales. The gills are white, then dirty pink, red speckled. The stipe reaches 6–8 cm in length and 1.5-2.5 cm in thickness, with a narrow ring, white at the top, the color of a hat under the ring. The flesh is dense, white at first, slightly pink when cut, then red, stains brown and blackens when cooked. It has a strong smell of fresh flour. Spores ellipsoidal 6-7 x 3.5-4 μm, smooth.

== Distribution and habitat ==
It is distributed throughout the northern hemisphere (including Polesia and forest steppes of Ukraine), especially in the northern temperate zone. It is an ectomycorrhizal fungus found in coniferous forests, forming relationship with pine trees (especially Pinus densiflora), on sandy soils. It often grows in the same forests as matsutake, although it fruits later (August–October).

== Edibility ==
Edible mushroom. In Ukraine it is considered tasty and used fresh. In Japan it is considered to be mediocre in taste and smell, inferior to real matsutake.
