= Tricholoma focale =

Scientific classification
- Kingdom: Fungi
- Division: Basidiomycota
- Class: Agaricomycetes
- Order: Agaricales
- Family: Tricholomataceae
- Genus: Tricholoma
- Species: T. focale

Binomial name
- Tricholoma focale (Fr.) Ricken

Synonyms
- Agaricus focalis Fr. (1838); Armillaria focalis (Fr.) P. Karst. (1879); Mastoleucomyces focalis (Fr.) Kuntze (1891); Sphaerocephalus focalis (Fr.) Earle (1909); Tricholoma robustum f. focale (Fr.) Pilát (1951); Cortinarius focalis (Fr.) M.M. Moser (1975); Agaricus caussetta Barla (1859); Armillaria caussetta Barla (1887); Tricholoma focale var. caussetta (Barla) Bon (1976); Tricholoma focale var. pseudocaligatum Bon (1984)

Species of fungus

Tricholoma focale
- Mycological characteristics
- Gills on hymenium
- Cap is convex
- Hymenium is adnexed or free
- Stipe has a ring
- Spore print is white
- Ecology is mycorrhizal
- Edibility is inedible

Tricholoma focale, commonly known as the veiled orange trich or booted knight, is a species of mushroom in the family Tricholomataceae, possessing a bitter, unpleasant taste, rendering it inedible.

== Taxonomy ==
Tricholoma focale was first described in 1838 by Elias Magnus Fries as Agaricus focalis. In 1879, it was transferred to the genus Armillaria, becoming Armillaria focalis. In 1914, it was transferred into the genus Tricholoma.

== Description ==
The cap of Tricholoma focale is orange in color. When young, it often has greenish coloration as well and is convex with an inrolled margin. As it gets older, it morphs from broadly convex to nearly flat. It is roughly 3-12 centimeters in diameter. It is scaly to fibrillose, with appressed fibrils, and the fibrils or scales are reddish brown. In older specimens, the cap can take on a reddish orange or orangish brown hue. The stipe is about 5-9 centimeters long and 2-3 centimeters wide. Tricholoma focale is buff in color and covered in orangish brown fibrils. An annulus is present, and the stipe base tapers. The gills are adnexed to free. They are white in color, with the edges often turning brownish in age. The spore print is white. The scent is strongly farinaceous, and can even be smelled in the soil the mushroom is growing in, due to the mycelial mats produced by this mushroom.

=== Similar species ===
Tricholoma focale is exceedingly similar to T. zelleri. However, T. zelleri has been described as distinct on the basis of its stickier cap, despite the original species description for T. focale having no mention of the stickiness or dryness of the cap. Despite this, many modern descriptions of T. focale describe the species as having a sticky cap, and as a result many people consider the two to be synonyms.

== Habitat and distribution ==
Tricholoma focale is found in Europe and northern North America. It is found under conifers. In the Pacific Northwest, it can be found in coastal forests and in the eastern Cascade Range.
