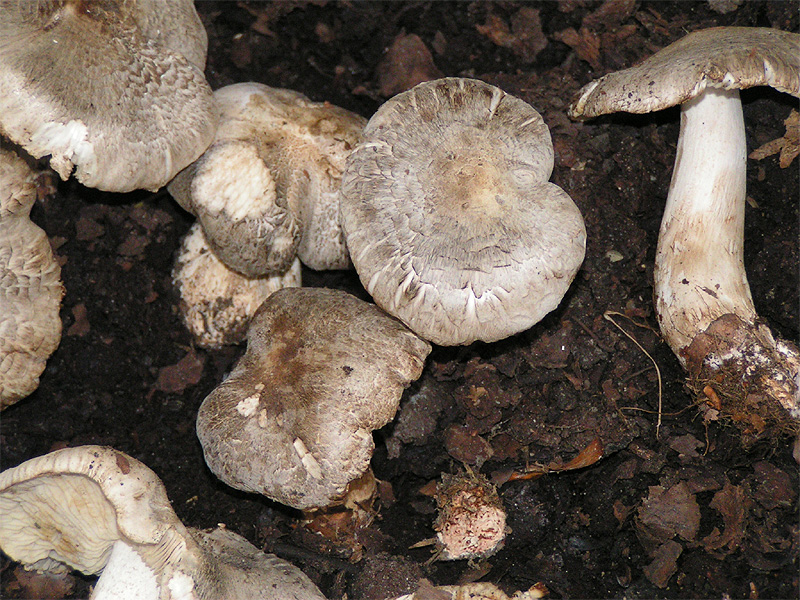

Scientific classification
- Kingdom: Fungi
- Division: Basidiomycota
- Class: Agaricomycetes
- Order: Agaricales
- Suborder: Tricholomatineae
- Family: Tricholomataceae
- Genus: Tricholoma
- Species: T. pardinum

Binomial name
- Tricholoma pardinum (Pers.) Quél. (1873)
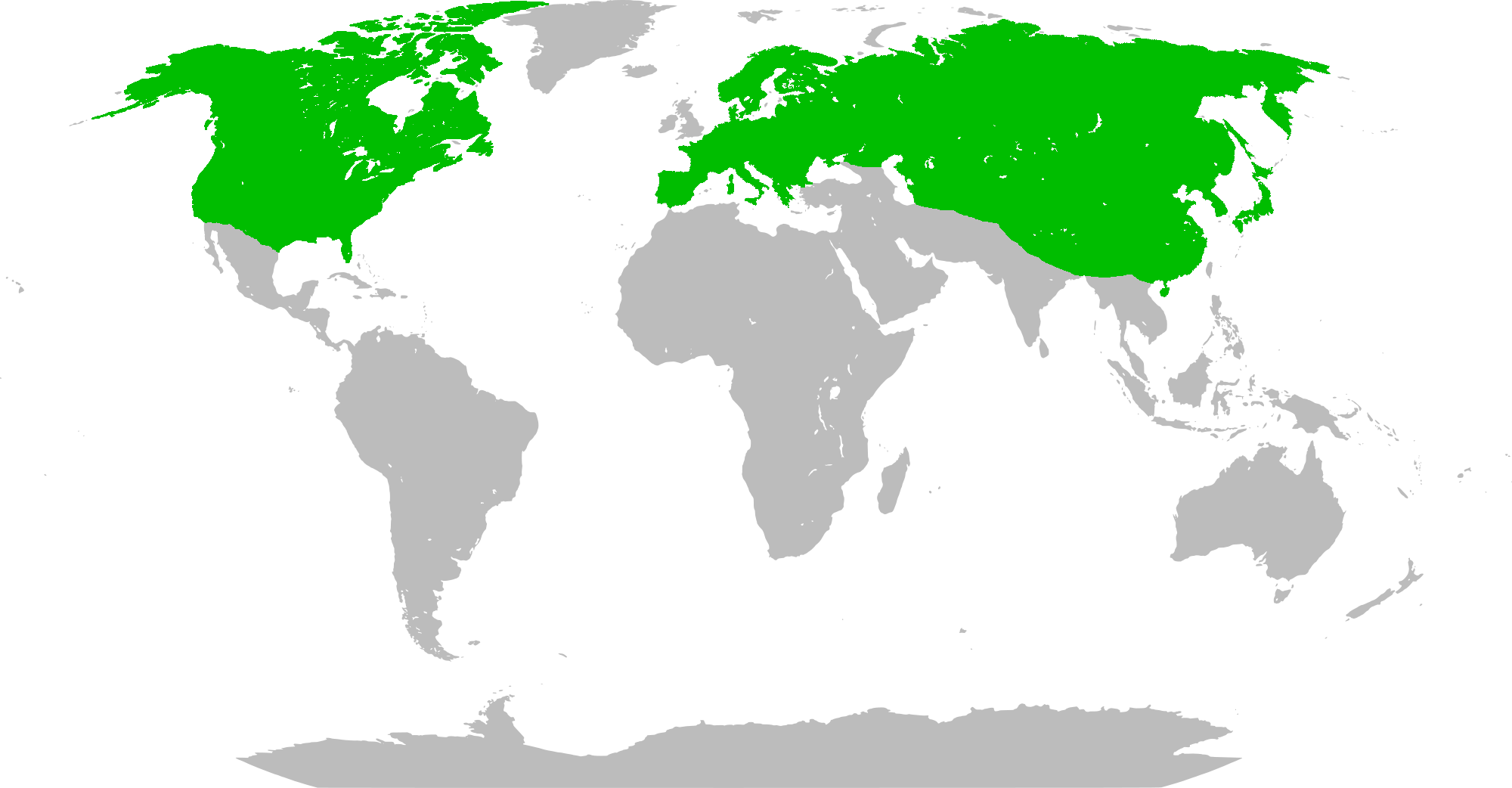
- T. pardinum range

Synonyms
- Agaricus myomyces var. pardinus Pers. (1801); Gyrophila tigrina Schaeff. ex Quel. (1886); Tricholoma pardalotum Herink & Kotl. (1967)

= Tricholoma pardinum =

Species of agaric fungus endemic to North America, Europe, and parts of Asia

Tricholoma pardinum
- Mycological characteristics
- Gills on hymenium
- Cap is convex
- Hymenium is free
- Stipe is bare
- Spore print is white
- Ecology is mycorrhizal
- Edibility is poisonous

Tricholoma pardinum, commonly known as the leopard trich, spotted tricholoma, tiger tricholoma, tigertop, leopard knight, or dirty trich, is a species of gilled mushroom. First officially described by Christiaan Hendrik Persoon in 1801, it has had a confusing taxonomic history that extends over two centuries. In 1762, German naturalist Jacob Christian Schäffer described the species Agaricus tigrinus with an illustration corresponding to what is thought to be T. pardinum, and consequently, the name Tricholoma tigrinum has been used erroneously in some European field guides.

The fruit body of Tricholoma pardinum is an imposing mushroom with a pale grey cap up to 15 cm (6 in) in diameter that is covered with dark brownish to greyish scales. The gills are whitish, and are not attached to the stout white to pale grey-brown stalk. The spore print is white.

It is widely distributed across North America, Europe, and parts of Asia. It is generally found in beech woodland in summer and autumn. One of the more toxic members of the genus Tricholoma, the species has been implicated in a number of episodes of mushroom poisoning, probably because it is a large, attractive mushroom with a pleasant smell and taste, and resembles several edible species. Ingesting it—even in small quantities—results in a severe, persistent gastroenteritis caused by an unknown mycotoxin.

== Taxonomy ==
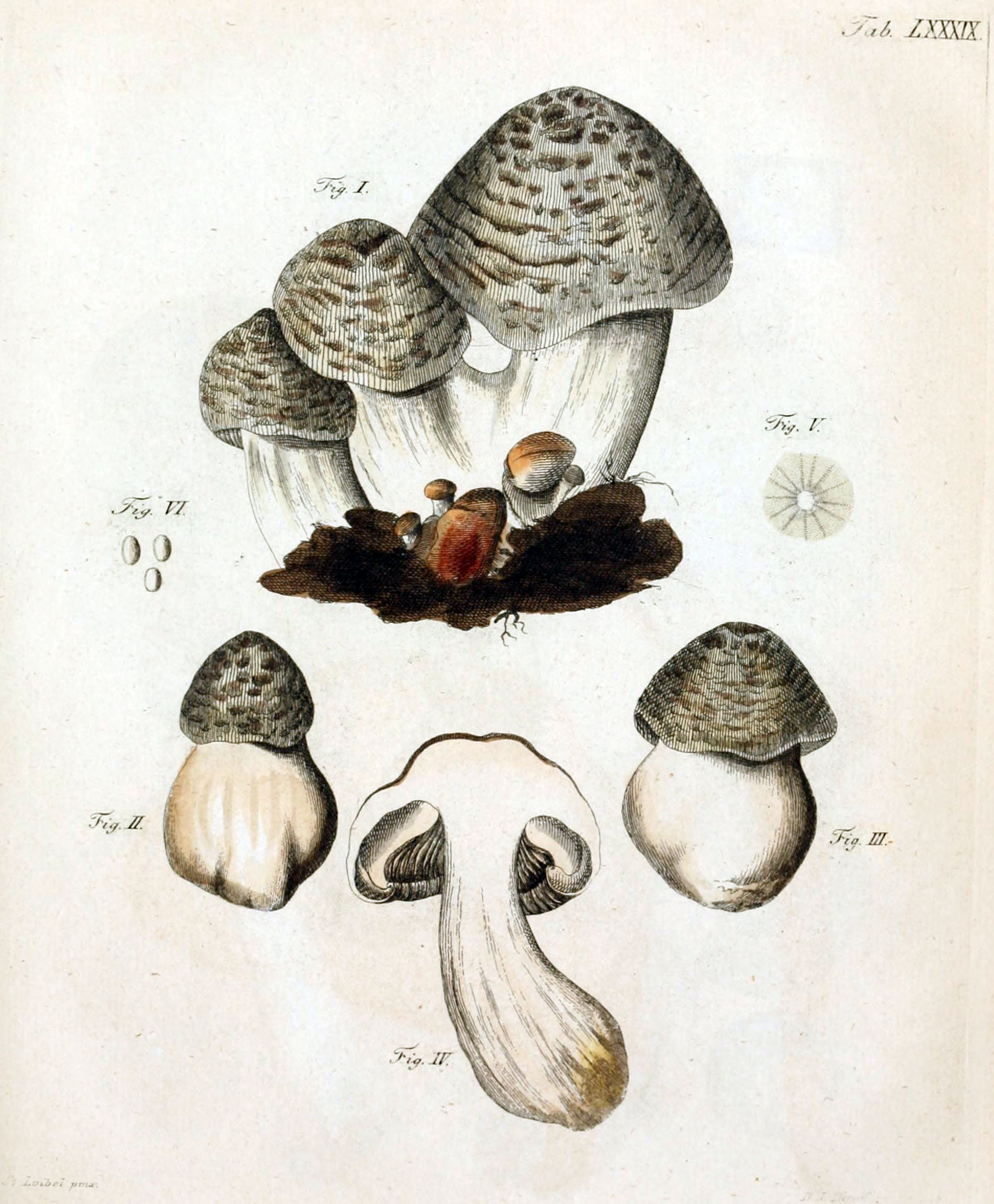
Schäffer's 1762 illustration of Agaricus tigrinus is now thought to represent Tricholoma pardinum.

The German naturalist Jacob Christian Schäffer published Fungorum qui in Bavaria et Palatinatu circa Ratisbonam nascuntur Icones in 1762, in which he described a mushroom he called Agaricus tigrinus. The illustration accompanying the name fits what we now know as Tricholoma pardinum; the description is less clear. Elias Magnus Fries used the name Agaricus tigrinus in his 1821 work Systema Mycologicum, in accordance with Bulliard's 1782 description, which now corresponds with Lentinus tigrinus. Christiaan Hendrik Persoon described this species as Agaricus myomyces var. pardinus in 1801, but queried whether it was a distinct species. In his 1838 work Epicrisis systematis mycologici: seu synopsis hymenomycetum, Fries assigned a different fungus again to the binomial name and linked it to Schäffer's 1762 description. French mycologist Lucien Quélet reclassified it as a species in 1873, giving it its current binomial name. Italian mycologist Alfredo Riva has noted that Swiss mycologist Louis Secretan provided a description forty years before Quélet, in his 1833 work Mycographie Suisse, and queried why it was ignored. He has proposed the fungus be written as Tricholoma pardinum (Secr.) Quél. Secretan's works are generally not recognised for nomenclatural purposes because he did not use binomial nomenclature consistently.

There has been confusion over which scientific name to use for over two hundred years. Tricholoma tigrinum has been used in some European field guides, but has been applied in error to this species. The uncertainty was such that Czech mycologists Josef Herink and František Kotlaba suggested in 1967 that both are incorrect and proposed the new name T. pardalotum.

Tricholoma pardinum lies within the subgenus Pardinicutis of Tricholoma, a grouping of similar species characterised by greyish, brownish, or pallid caps that are woolly or covered in small scales, spores with a length between eight and eleven micrometres, and abundant clamp connections in the hyphae. Molecular analyses suggest that T. pardinum is closely related to T. huronense, T. mutabile, and T. venenatum. Tricholoma pardinum var. filamentosum is an uncommon variety, described in 1983 by Carlo Luciano Alessio, which produces mushrooms with more fibrillose caps and stalks than the typical variety. It is found in southern Europe, where it associates with chestnut and spruce trees. Another variety has been described as T. pardinum var. unguentatum, characterised by daintier mushrooms that have a greasy coating on their caps.

The specific epithet pardinum is derived from the Latin pardus "leopard", referring to its mottled or spotted cap. The generic name derives from Greek θρίξ thrix "hair" (GEN τριχός trichos) and λῶμα lōma "hem", "fringe", or "border". Common names include striped tricholoma, spotted tricholoma, tiger tricholoma, poison trich, leopard knight, and tigertop. Dirty trich was a name coined by author Gary H. Lincoff in response to a publisher's request for a more accessible name than its binomial one for North American guidebooks.

== Description ==
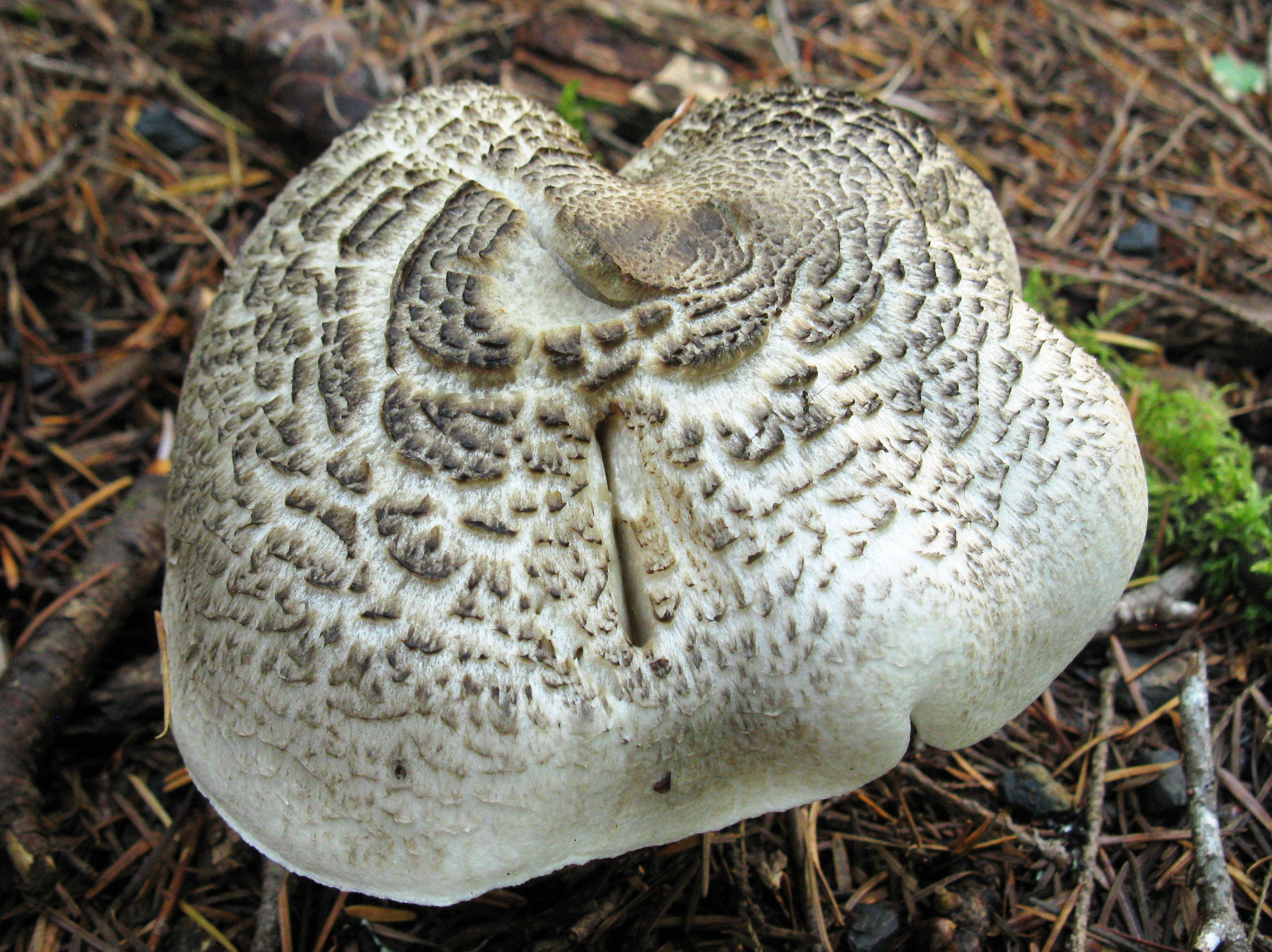
The silvery-grey cap surface is covered with concentrically arranged scales that diminish as they approach the margin.

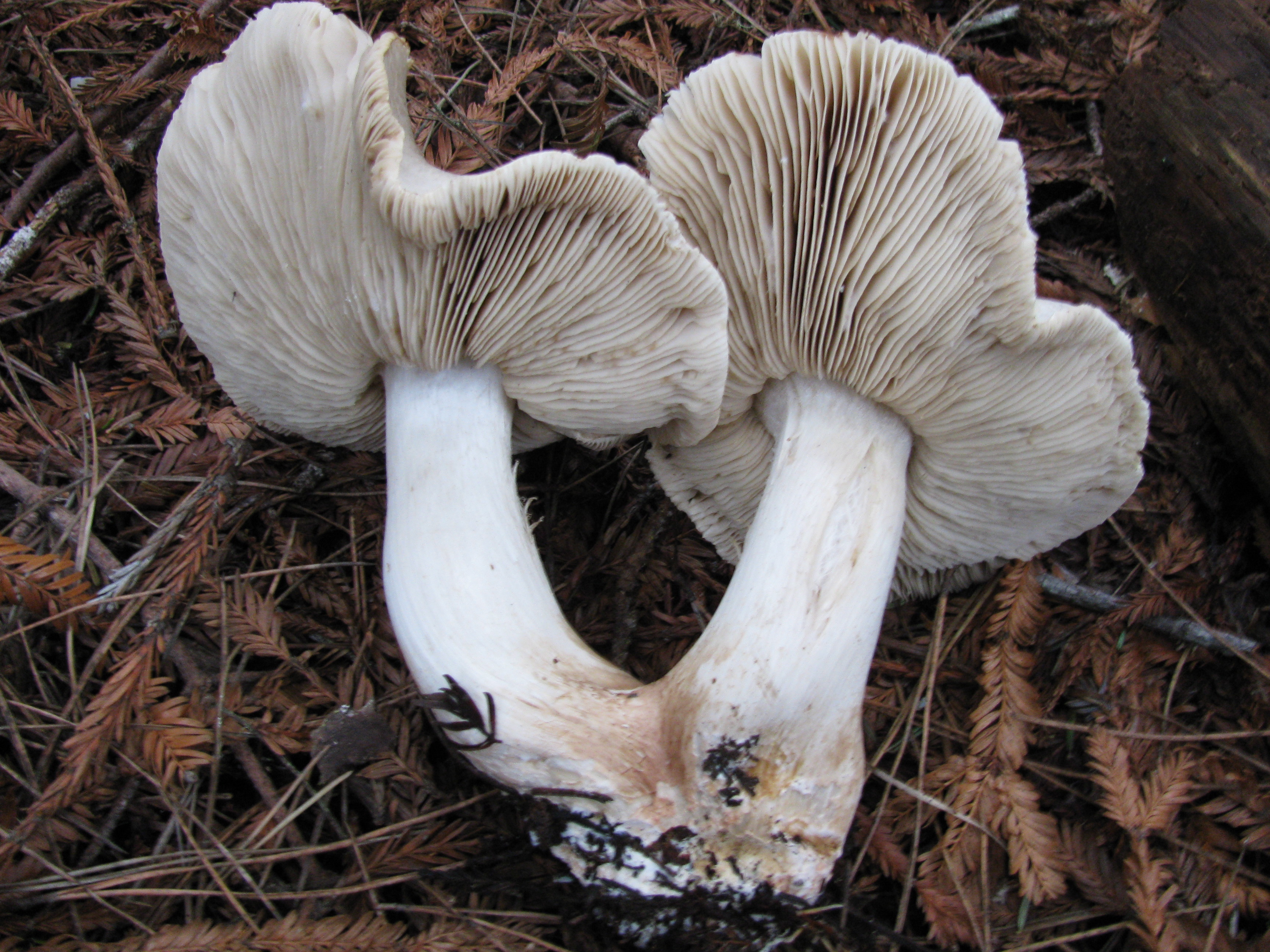
Gills that are free from attachment to the stalk; the discolouration at the stalk base is characteristic.

The fruit body is a medium-sized mushroom, with a cap ranging from 5–15 cm (2–6 in) in diameter. The cap is initially hemispherical before flattening with maturity, and has a broad, shallow umbo. The cap margin is initially curled inwards but uncurls as it matures. The cap surface is silvery-grey and covered with concentrically patterned darker grey, brown or blackish scales that grow paler toward the cap margin, Secretan noting its resemblance to the cap of Sarcodon imbricatus. The gills are free (unattached to the stalk), white and thick, may have a yellow or greenish tint, and may drip water, as may the top of the stalk when broken. With age, the gill edges can become jagged and rough. The gill spacing is rather variable, ranging from distant to crowded; typically, between 100–120 gills extend fully from the stalk to the edge of the cap, with a variable number of lamellulae (shorter gills not extending fully from stalk to cap margin).

The stout stalk may be white, pale grey or pale brown, and is thicker at the base. The texture of the stalk surface ranges from fibrillose (appearing to be made of coarse fibres arranged longitudinally) to more or less smooth, and the stalk base will stain dirty brown to yellow when bruised. It is 3–12 cm (1–4.5 in) high and 1.5–3 cm (0.5–1 in) wide, with the base 2.5–4 cm (1–1.5 in) in diameter, and bruises a dirty yellow. There is no ring or volva. The flesh is whitish and has a pleasant mealy smell and taste. Variety filamentosum has a mealy odour and taste reminiscent of cucumber.

The spore print is white, and the oval to oblong spores are 7.5–9.5 μm long by 5.0–7.0 μm wide. Spores are smooth, hyaline (translucent), nonamyloid, and have a prominent hilum. The basidia (spore-bearing cells) are cylindrical to club shaped, four spored, and measure 39–50 by 8.0–9.6 μm. The cystidia present on the gill edge (cheilocystidia) are thin walled, hyaline, have a short stalk and a spherical apical portion, and measure 29–41 by 12–21 μm; cystidia are absent from the gill face. The cap cuticle ranges in cellular form from a cutis (in which the hyphae are bent over, running parallel to the cap surface) to a trichoderm (with hyphae emerging roughly parallel, like hairs, perpendicular to the cap surface); the hyphae comprising the cuticle are cylindrical, and measure 2.0–9.0 μm wide with a club-shaped tip up to 11 μm wide.

=== Similar species ===
Tricholoma lookalikes

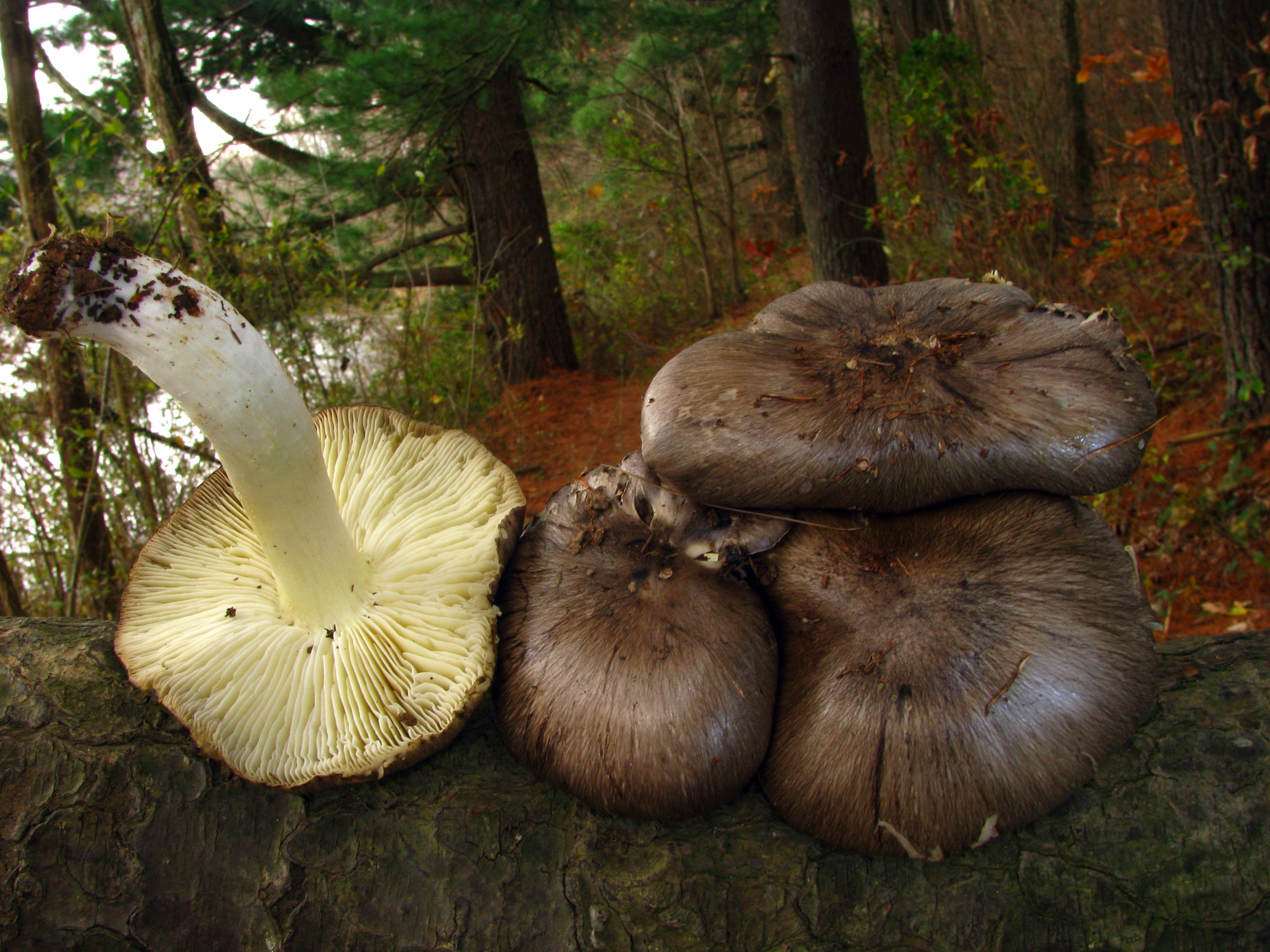
T. portentosum

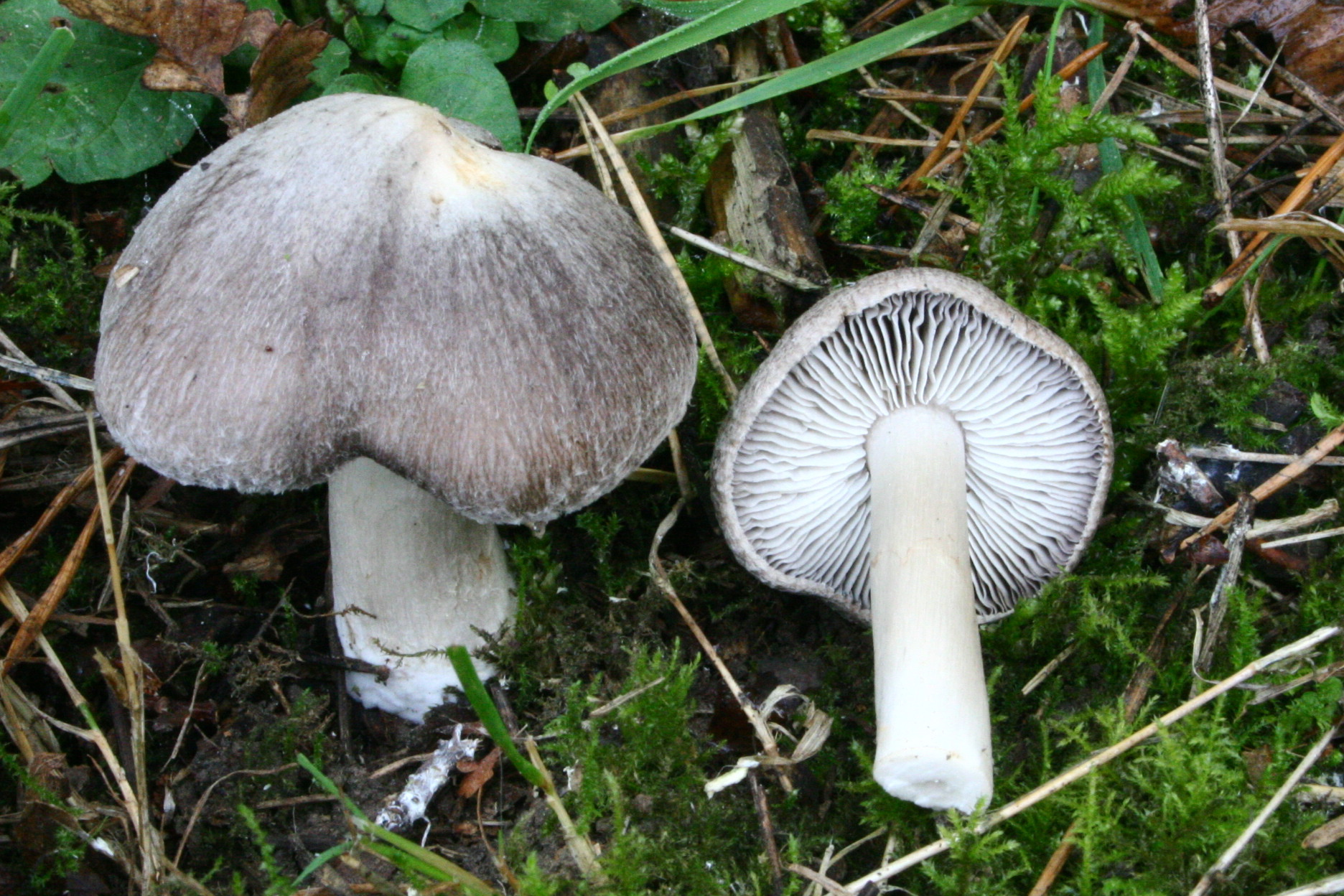
T. terreum

Tricholoma pardinum mushrooms may be confused with several edible grey-capped members of the genus Tricholoma, and some authorities recommend leaving all grey-capped Tricholoma mushrooms for experienced hunters. There are several superficially similar European species that could be mistaken for T. pardinum. The smaller T. terreum lacks a mealy smell and cap scales, is darker and less robust, and has smaller spores measuring 5.0–7.5 by 4.0–5.0 μm. The edible T. argyraceum somewhat resembles T. pardinum—but with finer scales, and gills and bruised parts that yellow with age. Unlike the preferentially montane T. pardinum, these lookalikes tend to fruit at lower elevations. T. atrosquamosum is smaller and darker than T. pardinum, and has a peppery aroma. T. orirubens has fine dark scales and pinkish gills, brittle flesh, and is generally smaller. T. myomyces is smaller than T. pardinum, has a thin, fibrous partial veil on young specimens, and elliptical spores measuring 5.0–6.0 by 3.5–4.0 μm. The edible and highly regarded T. portentosum is of a similar size, though has a uniform grey cap that is never scaled.

In North America, Tricholoma pardinum can be confused with T. nigrum and forms of T. virgatum that have more streaked rather than spotted caps. A form of T. pardinum in North America can be nearly white with pale scales, and may be confused with the whitish edible species T. resplendens. Microscopically, the presence of clamp connections sets T. pardinum apart from most other members of the genus; the similar-looking (though more tan-coloured) T. venenatum also has them. According to Alexander H. Smith, T. huronense is closely related, but can be distinguished from T. pardinum by its narrower gills, its tendency to form drops of reddish liquid on the gills and stalk, and an ash-grey and scaly stalk surface. T. atroviolaceum and T. imbricatum are also similar.

== Distribution and habitat ==
Tricholoma pardinum is found across Europe, where it is more common in the south. It is abundant in the Jura Mountains in eastern France. The species is found in Belgium and Germany, but has not been recorded from the Netherlands or the British Isles. A historical record from Estonia has been discarded because no herbarium specimens could be found. In Asia, it has been recorded from İzmir Province in southwestern Turkey, China, and Sado Island in Japan. It is found widely across temperate North America, where Santa Cruz County and Sierra Nevada in central California in the west of the continent, and the central Appalachians in the east form the southern limits of its distribution. T. pardinum is commonly associated with conifers in the Rocky Mountains and Pacific Northwest, and with tanoak (Lithocarpus densiflorus) and madrone (Arbutus spp.) in California. The mushroom can be abundant in some years, especially warmer years with higher rainfall, yet missing or rare for several years in between. In Europe, it is found on chalky soil in woodland with beech and fir in summer and autumn, where it prefers areas of some elevation. Although it may be found in groups or fairy rings, it most commonly occurs singly.

== Toxicity ==
Tricholoma pardinum is one of several poisonous members of the genus Tricholoma; its large size, fleshy appearance, and pleasant smell and taste add to the risk of its being accidentally consumed. It was responsible for more than twenty percent of cases of mushroom poisoning in Switzerland in the first half of the 20th century. Many cases of poisoning arise in the Jura Mountains. Eating it causes highly unpleasant gastrointestinal symptoms of nausea, dizziness, vomiting, and diarrhea. These arise fifteen minutes to two hours after consumption and often persist for several hours; complete recovery usually takes four to six days. Sweating and anxiety may be evident, and disturbance in liver function has been recorded. Cramping may occur in the calves. In one case, seven people and a cat suffered severe symptoms after sharing a meal that contained only two mushroom caps. The toxin, the identity of which is unknown, appears to cause a sudden inflammation of the mucous membranes lining the stomach and intestines.

These symptoms may be severe enough to warrant hospitalisation. Treatment is supportive; antispasmodic medicines may lessen colicky abdominal cramps, and activated charcoal may be administered early on to bind residual toxin. Intravenous fluids may be required if dehydration has been extensive, especially with children and the elderly. Once gastric contents are emptied, metoclopramide may be used in cases of recurrent vomiting.

== See also ==
- List of North American Tricholoma
- List of Tricholoma species
