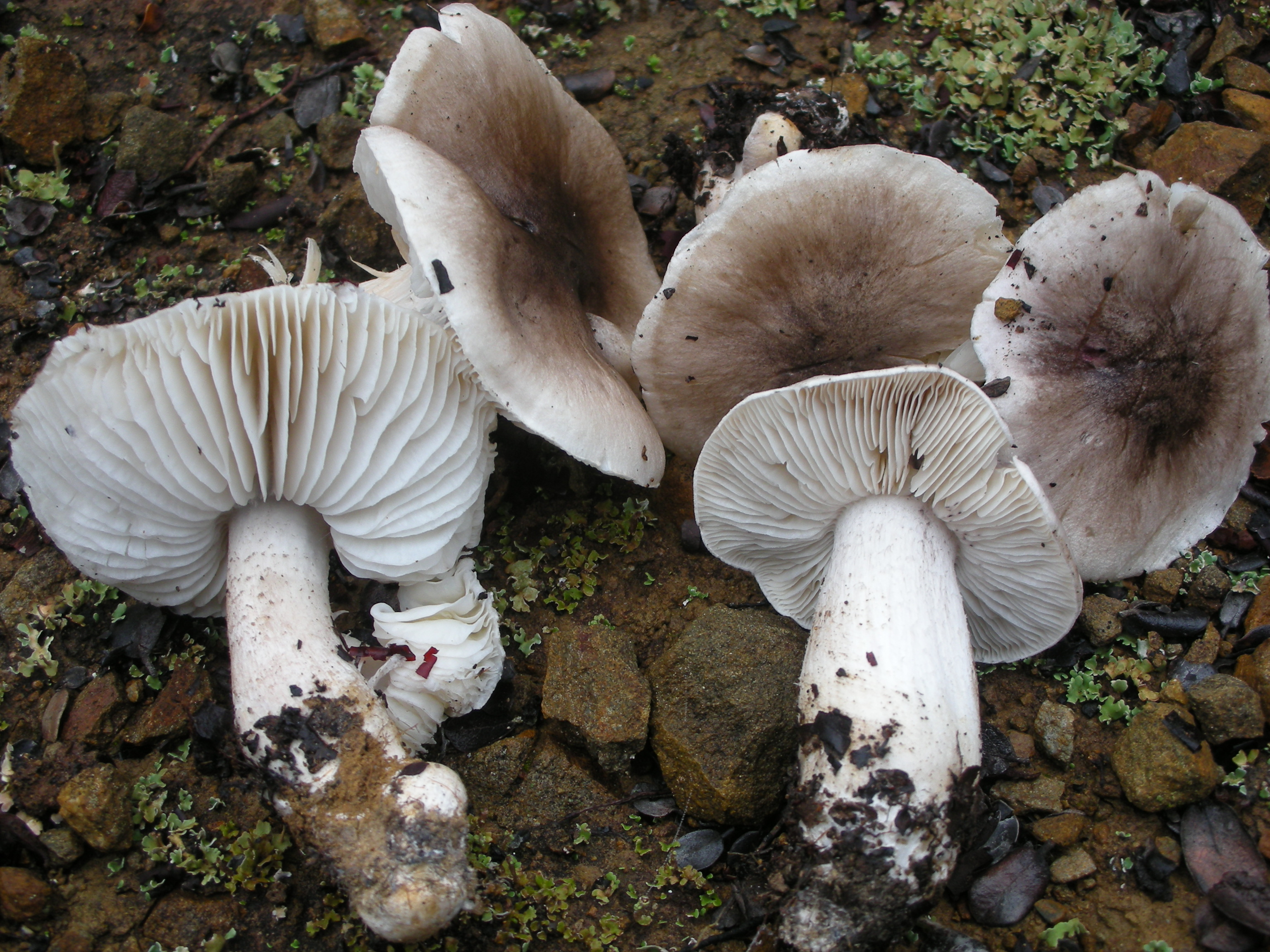

Scientific classification
- Kingdom: Fungi
- Division: Basidiomycota
- Class: Agaricomycetes
- Order: Agaricales
- Family: Tricholomataceae
- Genus: Tricholoma
- Species: T. griseoviolaceum

Binomial name
- Tricholoma griseoviolaceum Shanks (1996)

= Tricholoma griseoviolaceum =

Species of fungus

Tricholoma griseoviolaceum is a mushroom of the agaric genus Tricholoma. It was described as new to science in 1996.

The cap ranges from 4–10 cm (1.6–3.9 in) in diameter; it is purplish gray with a dark center, and brownish gray in age. The stalk is 6–12 cm (2.4–4.7 in) long and 1–2 cm wide. The flesh is whitish gray. The spores are white. The odor and taste resemble cucumbers. Its edibility is unknown.

Similar species include Tricholoma atroviolaceum, T. portentosum, and T. virgatum.

== See also ==
- List of North American Tricholoma
- List of Tricholoma species
