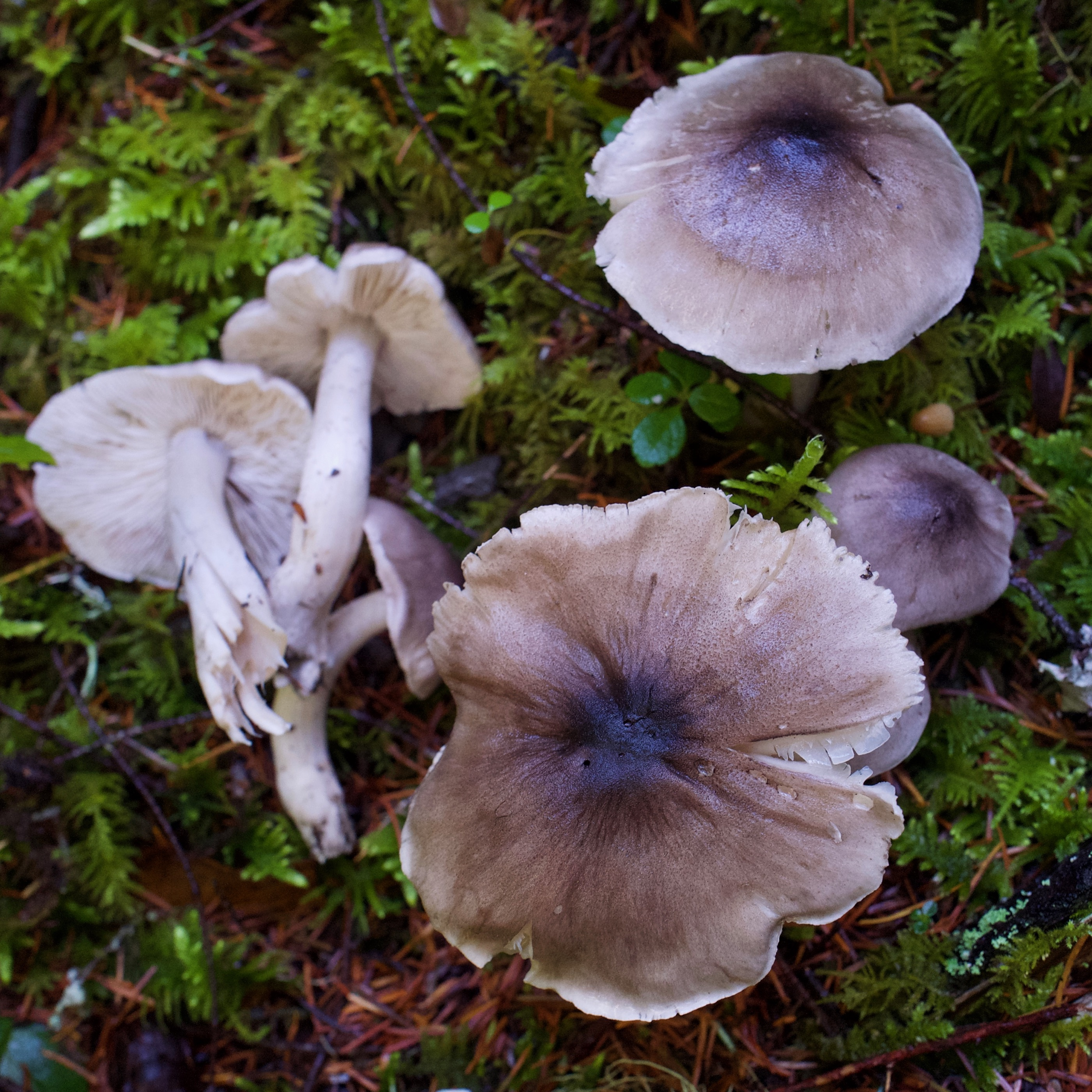

Scientific classification
- Kingdom: Fungi
- Division: Basidiomycota
- Class: Agaricomycetes
- Order: Agaricales
- Family: Tricholomataceae
- Genus: Tricholoma
- Species: T. nigrum

Binomial name
- Tricholoma nigrum Shanks & Ovrebo (1996)

= Tricholoma nigrum =

Species of fungus

Tricholoma nigrum is a mushroom of the agaric genus Tricholoma. It was described as new to science in 1996 from a collection made on the Oregon Coast where it occurred with Pinus contorta. It has also been found in an old-growth conifer forest. It fruits during fall.

The cap is moist to semi-sticky, with dark gray scales or fibrils in the center. The gills are white to gray. The stipe is whitish and covered with fibrils and sometimes dark scales near the top. The taste and odor are starchlike. It is considered unlikely to be edible.

Similar species include Tricholoma atrosquamosum, T. atroviolaceum, and T. luteomaculosum.

== See also ==
- List of North American Tricholoma
- List of Tricholoma species
