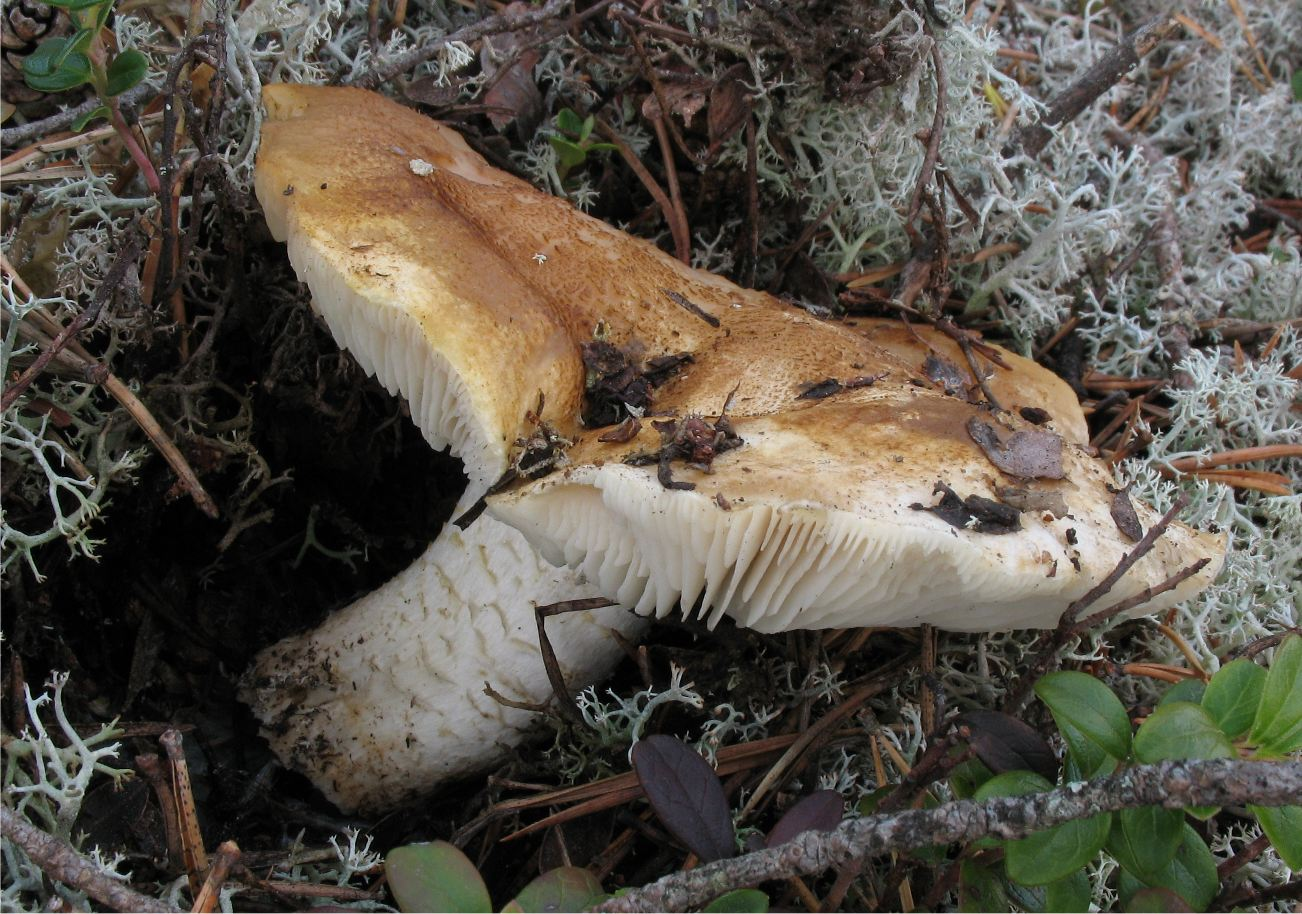

Conservation status
- Vulnerable (IUCN 3.1)

Scientific classification
- Kingdom: Fungi
- Division: Basidiomycota
- Class: Agaricomycetes
- Order: Agaricales
- Family: Tricholomataceae
- Genus: Tricholoma
- Species: T. apium

Binomial name
- Tricholoma apium Jul.Schäff. (1925)

Synonyms
- Tricholoma helviodor Pilát & Svrček (1946); Tricholoma vaccinoides Pilát (1971)

= Tricholoma apium =

Species of fungus

Tricholoma apium is a mushroom of the agaric genus Tricholoma that is found in Europe and North America. It is classified as vulnerable in the IUCN Red List of Threatened Species. It was first described by Julius Schäffer in 1925.

== Description ==
The cap of Tricholoma apium starts out buff or whitish and becomes browner as the mushroom matures. It is slightly tomentose or areolate. It starts out convex to umbonate and becomes broadly convex to flat in age. The stipe is whitish in color and about 3-8 centimeters long and 1-2 centimeters wide. It is scaly and fibrillose. The gills are white, though they can stain yellowish in older specimens. They are notched. The spore print is white. The mushroom has a distinctive scent, described as being similar to that of celery.

=== Similar species ===
Tricholoma apium is recognized by its celery-like scent, yellowish brown coloration, and cracking cap. However, it has some lookalikes. T. manzanitae is similar but grows under manzanita and madrone. It also has a slimy cap when wet. Leucopaxillus gentianeus can also be similar, but it has a brown, smoother cap and adnate to slightly decurrent gills. It also has a bitter taste. L. albissimus is also somewhat similar, but it has adnate to slightly decurrent gills and a white cap.

== Habitat and distribution ==
Tricholoma apium is found in Europe and North America. In North America, it is rare but can be found in Michigan, Massachusetts, Newfoundland, and the Pacific Northwest. In Europe, it is mycorrhizal with scots pine, while in North America it grows with other conifers. In the Pacific Northwest, it is found in old-growth forests. The species is threatened by habitat loss.

Tricholoma apium
- Mycological characteristics
- Gills on hymenium
- Cap is convex or flat
- Hymenium is sinuate
- Stipe is bare
- Spore print is white
- Ecology is mycorrhizal
- Edibility is unknown

== See also ==
- List of North American Tricholoma
- List of Tricholoma species
