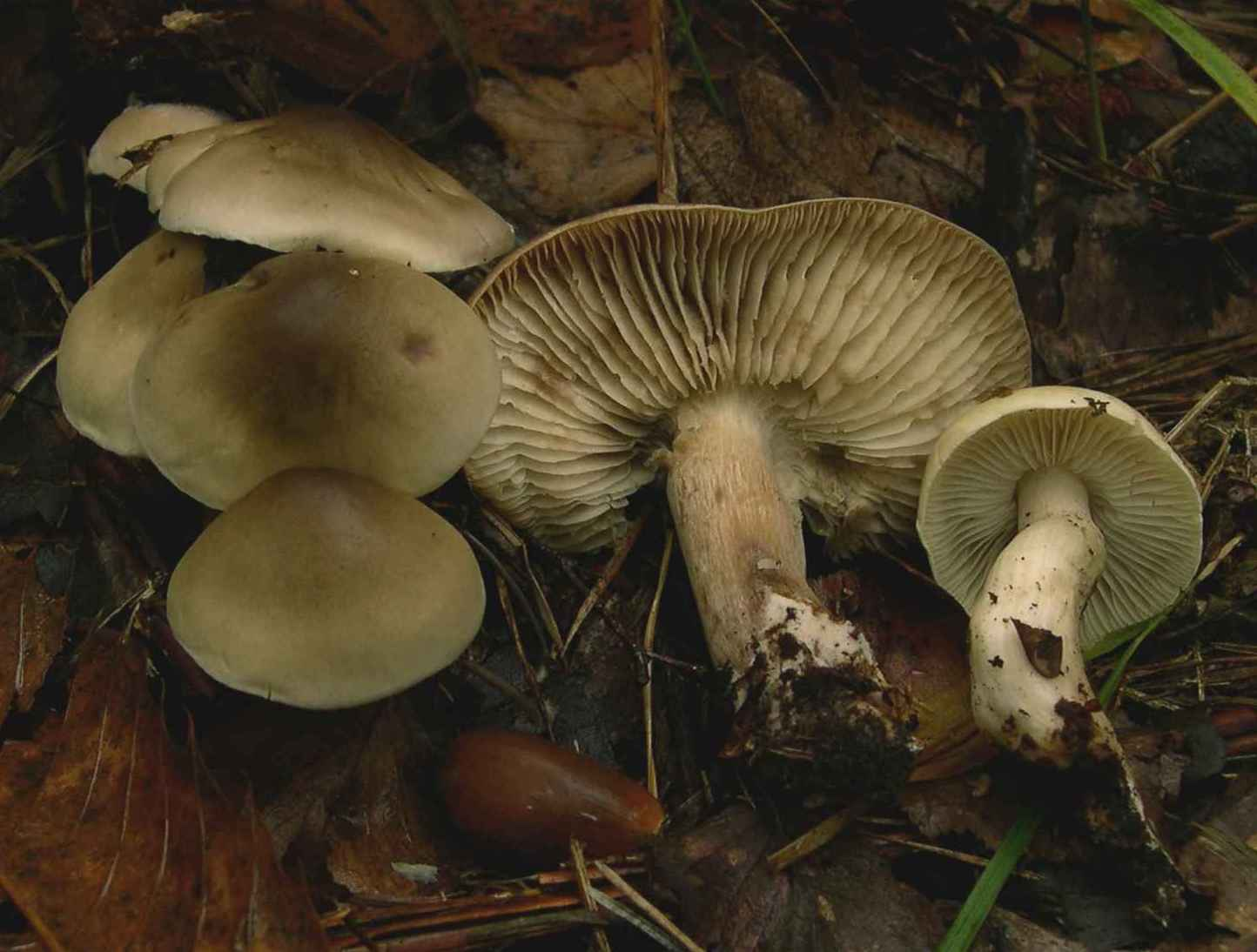

Conservation status
- Secure (NatureServe)

Scientific classification
- Kingdom: Fungi
- Division: Basidiomycota
- Class: Agaricomycetes
- Order: Agaricales
- Family: Tricholomataceae
- Genus: Tricholoma
- Species: T. saponaceum

Binomial name
- Tricholoma saponaceum (Fr.) P.Kumm. (1871)

Synonyms
- Agaricus saponaceus Fr. (1818); Tricholoma atrovirens (Pers.) Sacc. (1887)

= Tricholoma saponaceum =

Species of fungus

Tricholoma saponaceum
- Mycological characteristics
- Gills on hymenium
- Cap is convex
- Hymenium is adnexed
- Stipe is bare
- Spore print is white
- Ecology is mycorrhizal
- Edibility is poisonous

Tricholoma saponaceum, also known as the soap-scented toadstool, soapy tricholoma, soapy trich, soapy knight or soap tricholoma is an inedible mushroom found in woodlands in Europe and North America.

== Taxonomy ==
Tricholoma saponaceum was first described in 1818 by seminal mycologist Elias Magnus Fries and given the name Agaricus saponaceus, before being placed in the genus Tricholoma by German mycologist Paul Kummer in 1871. The specific epithet saponaceum is derived from the Latin 'of or pertaining to soap'. Its names in other European languages, such as French Tricolome à odeur de savon, and German Seifenritterling have a similar derivation to its English names-soap-scented toadstool, soapy knight or soap tricholoma—all relating to its soapy scent.

Tricholoma saponaceum is yet another fungus which may represent a species complex of two or more species. The variety ardosiacum, described by Italian mycologist Giacomo Bresadola, has a dark blue-grey cap.

== Description ==
Tricholoma saponaceum has a convex cap about 4–15 cm (1.6–5.9 in) across, with a vague umbo which flattens with age. The colour is highly variable, with greyish, greenish, olive, yellowish and brownish shades reported. The cap is paler at the margin and fades with age. The widely spaced gills are adnexed and whitish, although may be tinted pale green and bruise pink. The whitish stipe (also sometimes displaying colors present in the cap) lacks a ring and can be swollen in its midriff, and measures 4–12 cm (1.6–4.7 in) tall by 1–3 cm (0.4–1.2 in) wide.

The flesh can but does not always stain pink-orange, and this color may already be present in the flesh of the stipe's base. The spore print is white, and the oval smooth spores measure 5–6 × 3–4 μm. The odour is distinctive and has been likened to newly scrubbed floors or soap.

=== Similar species ===
Its gills may lead it to being confused with Hygrophorus species. It is similar in appearance to Tricholoma griseoviolaceum.

== Distribution and habitat ==
Tricholoma saponaceum is a terrestrial mushroom found in Europe and North America. It is abundant in the Pacific Northwest and Rocky Mountains. It is found in coniferous and deciduous woodlands (more commonly the former in North America) from late summer to late autumn. Spruce, live oak, tanoak, and madrone are species it can be associated with in the western United States. It is associated with oak in Central and southern Europe.

== Toxicity ==
Bland or mild tasting, the fungus is usually classified as inedible or poisonous in guidebooks. It contains toxins which can cause severe gastric upset.

== See also ==
- Hygrocybe
- List of North American Tricholoma
- List of Tricholoma species
