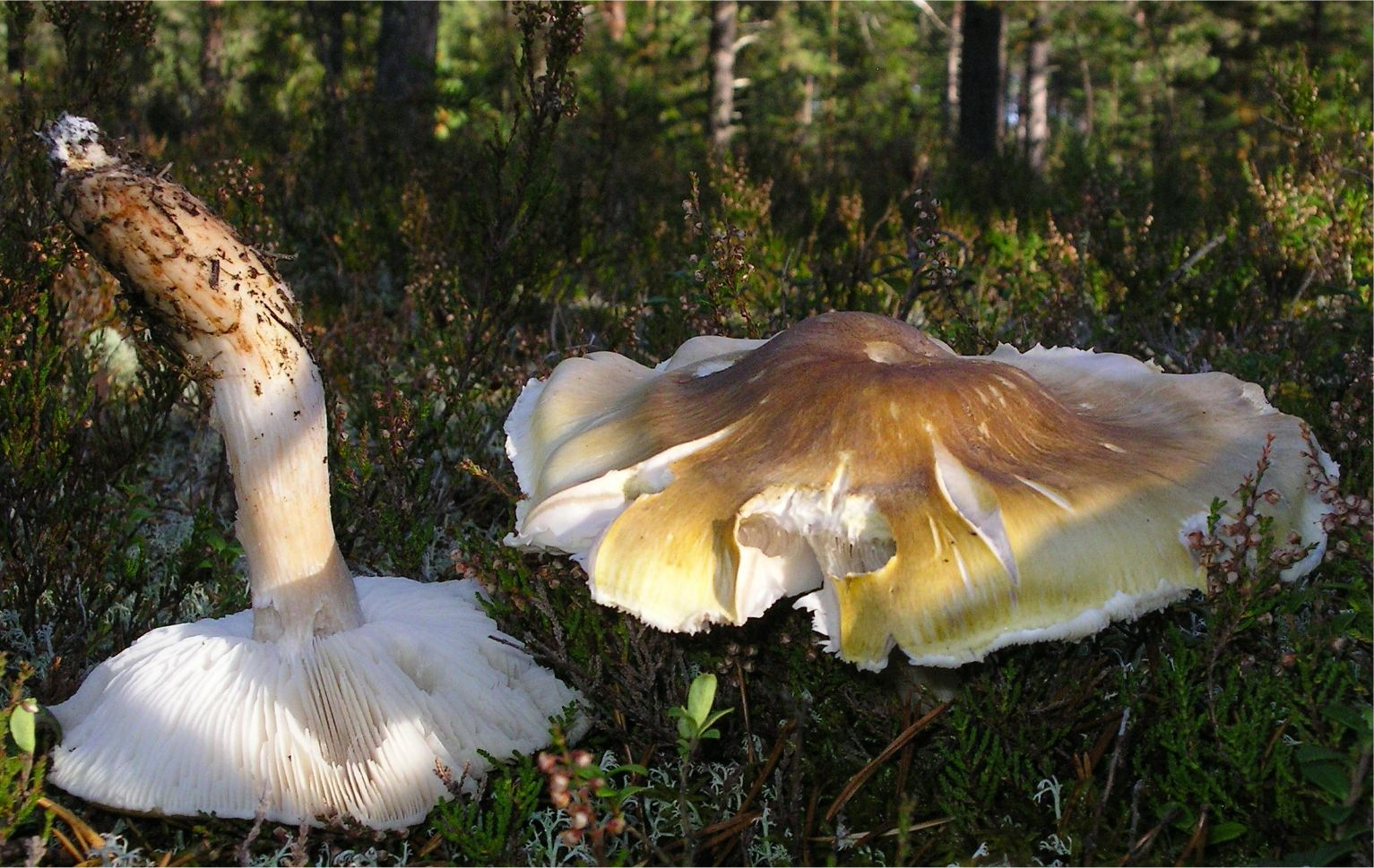

Scientific classification
- Kingdom: Fungi
- Division: Basidiomycota
- Class: Agaricomycetes
- Order: Agaricales
- Family: Tricholomataceae
- Genus: Tricholoma
- Species: T. arvernense

Binomial name
- Tricholoma arvernense Bon (1976)

Synonyms
- Tricholoma sejunctum var. arvernense Bon (1975); Tricholoma sejunctoides P.D.Orton (1987)

= Tricholoma arvernense =

Species of fungus

Tricholoma arvernense is a mushroom of the agaric genus Tricholoma. First described as a variety of Tricholoma sejunctum by French mycologist Marcel Bon in 1975, he promoted it to species status a year later.

== Description ==
The cap of Tricholoma arvernense varies in color from yellowish to olive brown to whitish. It is about 5-12 centimeters in diameter, and it starts out conical to convex and becomes flat and umbonate in age. It has an appressed-fibrillose texture. The stipe is about 4-8 centimeters long and 1-2 centimeters wide. It is whitish in color and is sometimes slightly swollen in the middle. The gills start out orangish to yellow and become whitish in age. They are notched. Lamellulae are present and abundant. The spore print is white.

=== Similar species ===
Several species of Tricholoma can be mistaken for T. arvernense. T. equestre is similar because it has yellow gills and a yellow cap, while T. davisiae is similar but has a very pronounced umbonate cap and a pinkish-staining stipe base. T. megalophaeum can be similar to younger specimens of T. arvernense, but it is typically darker colored and has a larger size. T. atrofibrillosum is also similar, but it has a greenish cap with streaks. T. subsejunctum is also similar, but like T. atrofibrillosum, it has a streaked cap.

== Habitat and distribution ==
Tricholoma arvernense is found in Europe and the Pacific Northwest. In Europe, it grows under pine, while in the Pacific Northwest, it typically grows under other conifers. Due to this, and the fact that the European version has large amounts of clamp connections while the Pacific Northwest version does not have very many, it is thought that the Pacific Northwest version may be distinct. Based on its species description, Tricholoma tumidum may be a more correct name.

Tricholoma arvernense
- Mycological characteristics
- Gills on hymenium
- Cap is convex or umbonate
- Hymenium is sinuate
- Stipe is bare
- Spore print is white
- Ecology is mycorrhizal
- Edibility is unknown

== See also ==
- List of North American Tricholoma
- List of Tricholoma species
