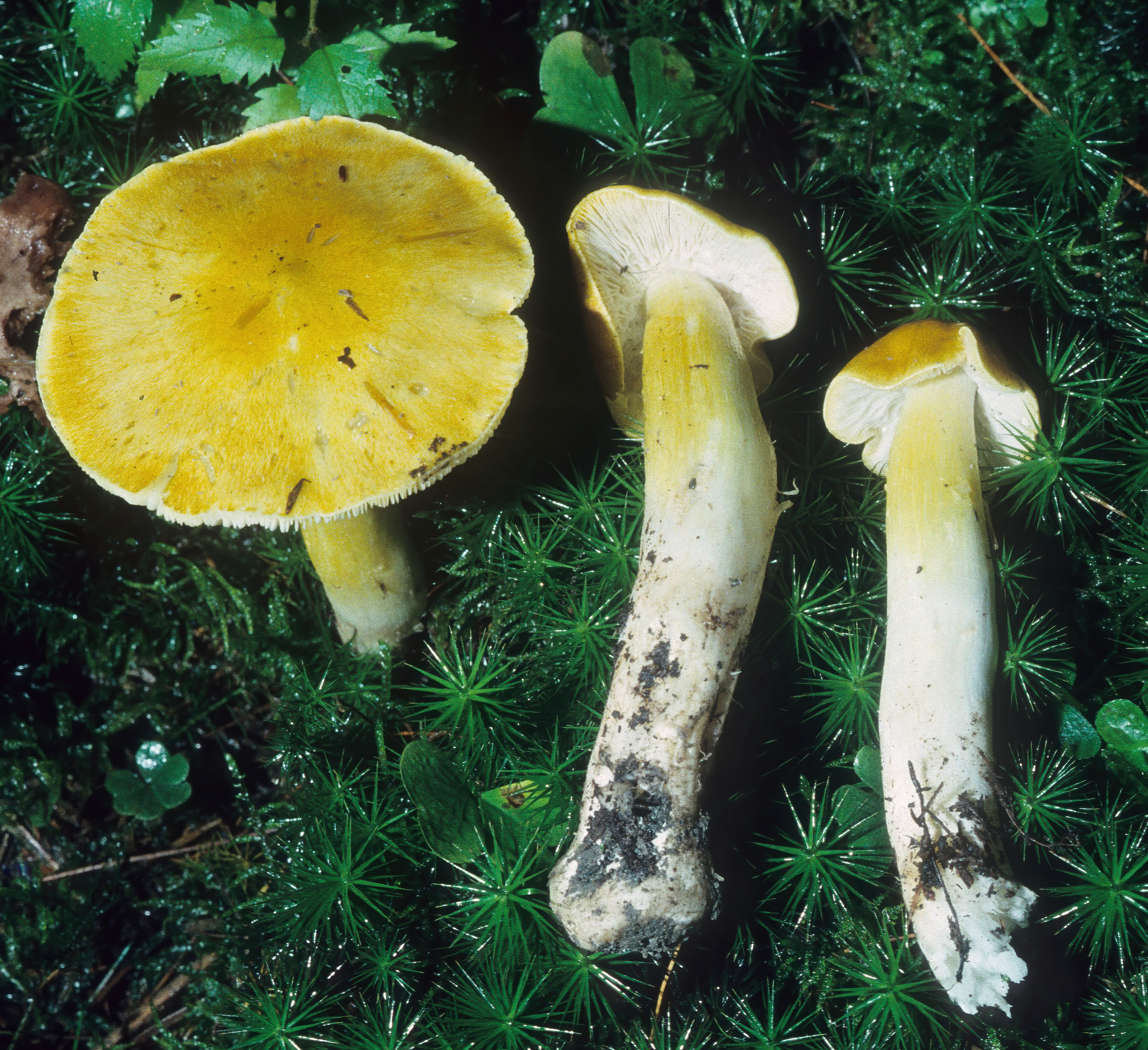

Scientific classification
- Domain: Eukaryota
- Kingdom: Fungi
- Division: Basidiomycota
- Class: Agaricomycetes
- Order: Agaricales
- Family: Tricholomataceae
- Genus: Tricholoma
- Species: T. subluteum

Binomial name
- Tricholoma subluteum Peck (1904)

Synonyms
- Melanoleuca sublutea (Peck) Murrill (1914)

= Tricholoma subluteum =

Species of fungus

Tricholoma subluteum is a mushroom of the agaric genus Tricholoma. Found in North America, it was described in 1904 by Charles Horton Peck.

== See also ==
- List of North American Tricholoma
