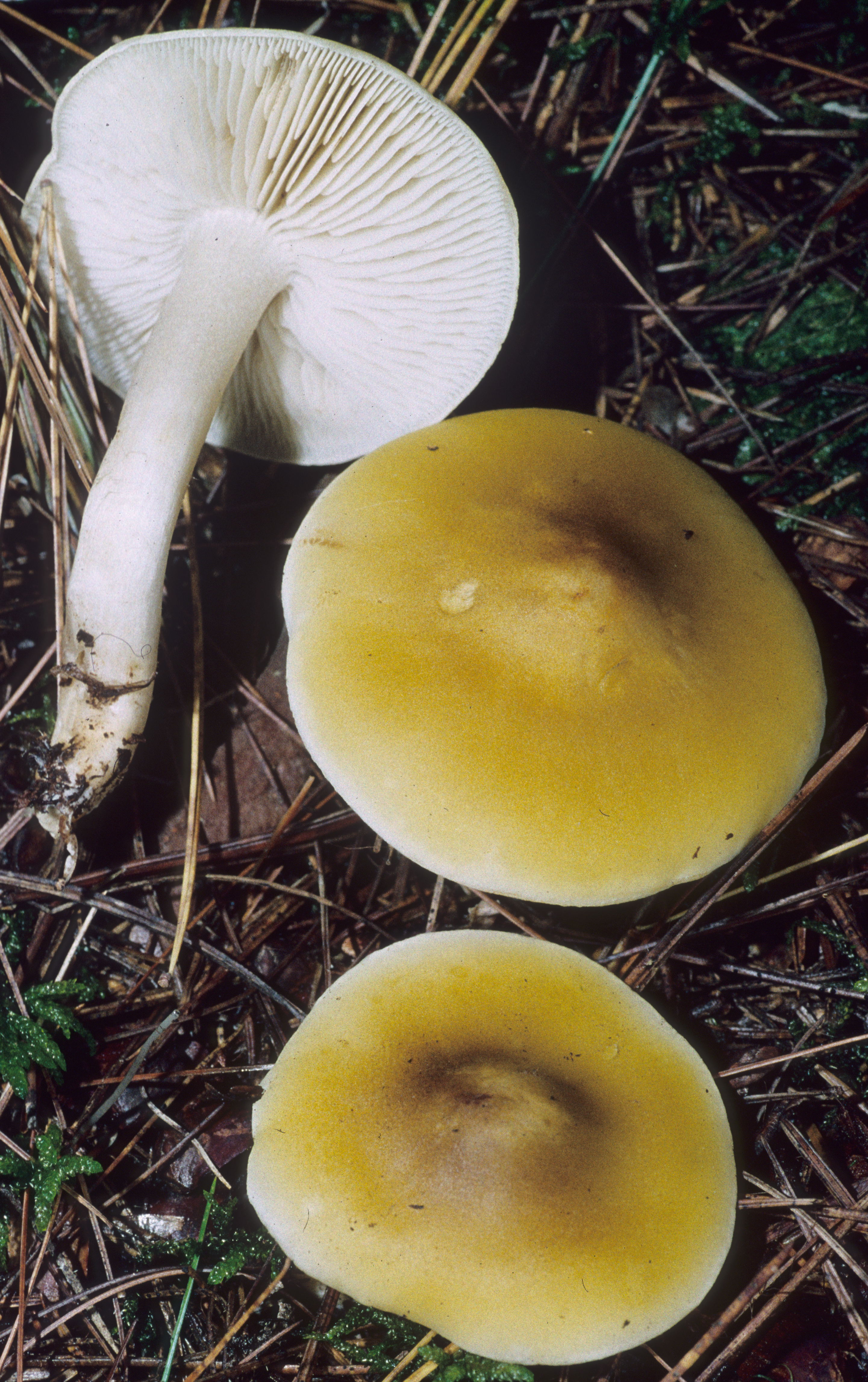

Scientific classification
- Kingdom: Fungi
- Division: Basidiomycota
- Class: Agaricomycetes
- Order: Agaricales
- Family: Tricholomataceae
- Genus: Tricholoma
- Species: T. fumosoluteum

Binomial name
- Tricholoma fumosoluteum (Peck) Sacc. (1887)

Synonyms
- Agaricus fumosoluteus Peck (1875); Melanoleuca fumosolutea (Peck) Murrill (1914)

= Tricholoma fumosoluteum =

Species of fungus

Tricholoma fumosoluteum is a mushroom of the agaric genus Tricholoma. First described by Charles Horton Peck in 1875 as Agaricus fumosoluteus, it was transferred to the genus Tricholoma by Pier Andrea Saccardo in 1887.

== See also ==
- List of North American Tricholoma
