= Tricholoma albidum =

Scientific classification
- Domain: Eukaryota
- Kingdom: Fungi
- Division: Basidiomycota
- Class: Agaricomycetes
- Order: Agaricales
- Family: Tricholomataceae
- Genus: Tricholoma
- Species: T. albidum

Binomial name
- Tricholoma albidum Bon (1984)

Synonyms
- Gyrophila argyracea var. albata Quél. (1890); Tricholoma argyraceum var. albatum (Quél.) Sacc. & Traverso (1911); Tricholoma albatum (Quél.) Maubl. & d'Astis (1938); Tricholoma argyraceum var. albidum (Bon) Krieglst. (1991)

Species of fungus

Tricholoma albidum is a mushroom of the agaric genus Tricholoma.

== See also ==
- List of North American Tricholoma
- List of Tricholoma species
