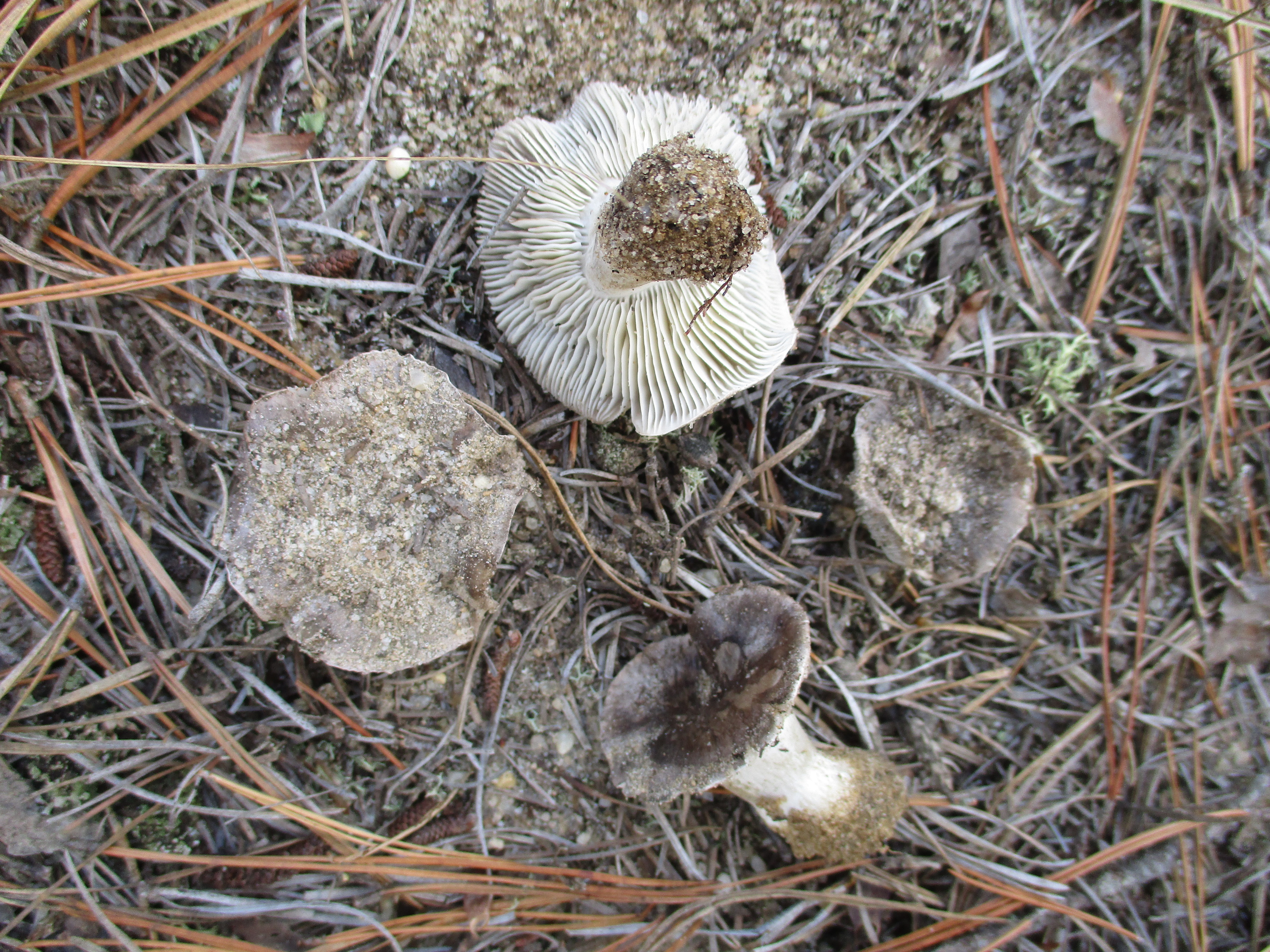

Scientific classification
- Kingdom: Fungi
- Division: Basidiomycota
- Class: Agaricomycetes
- Order: Agaricales
- Family: Tricholomataceae
- Genus: Tricholoma
- Species: T. niveipes

Binomial name
- Tricholoma niveipes Peck (1902)

Synonyms
- Melanoleuca niveipes (Peck) Murrill (1914)

= Tricholoma niveipes =

Species of fungus

Tricholoma niveipes is a mushroom of the agaric genus Tricholoma. It was formally described as new to science by American mycologist Charles Horton Peck in 1901.

== See also ==
- List of North American Tricholoma
