= Tricholoma olivaceobrunneum =

Scientific classification
- Domain: Eukaryota
- Kingdom: Fungi
- Division: Basidiomycota
- Class: Agaricomycetes
- Order: Agaricales
- Family: Tricholomataceae
- Genus: Tricholoma
- Species: T. olivaceobrunneum

Binomial name
- Tricholoma olivaceobrunneum Ovrebo (1986)

Species of fungus

Tricholomaolivaceobrunneum is a mushroom of the agaric genus Tricholoma. It was formally described in 1986.

== See also ==
- List of North American Tricholoma
- List of Tricholoma species
