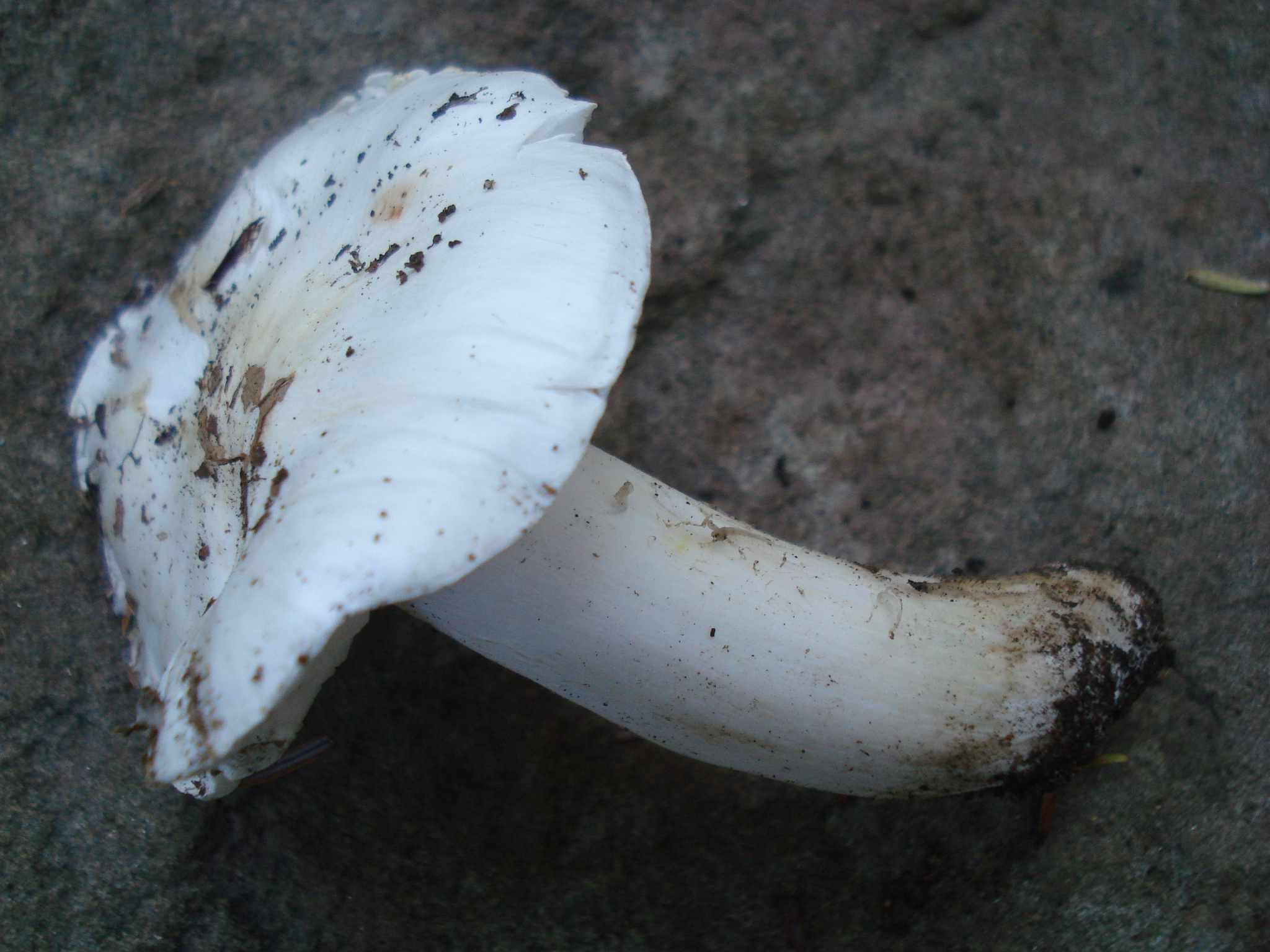

Scientific classification
- Domain: Eukaryota
- Kingdom: Fungi
- Division: Basidiomycota
- Class: Agaricomycetes
- Order: Agaricales
- Family: Tricholomataceae
- Genus: Tricholoma
- Species: T. subresplendens

Binomial name
- Tricholoma subresplendens (Murrill) Murrill (1914)

Synonyms
- Melanoleuca subresplendens Murrill; Tricholoma subresplendens (Murrill) Sacc. & Trotter (1925)

= Tricholoma subresplendens =

Species of fungus

Tricholoma subresplendens is a mushroom of the agaric genus Tricholoma. It was first described by American mycologist William Alphonso Murrill in 1914.

== See also ==
- List of North American Tricholoma
