= Tricholoma palustre =

Scientific classification
- Domain: Eukaryota
- Kingdom: Fungi
- Division: Basidiomycota
- Class: Agaricomycetes
- Order: Agaricales
- Family: Tricholomataceae
- Genus: Tricholoma
- Species: T. palustre

Binomial name
- Tricholoma palustre A.H.Sm. (1942)

Species of fungus

Tricholoma palustre is a mushroom of the agaric genus Tricholoma. It was formally described by American mycologist Alexander H. Smith in 1942. The mushroom has a soft odour and is also light in colour.

== See also ==
- List of North American Tricholoma
