= Tricholoma farinaceum =

Scientific classification
- Kingdom: Fungi
- Division: Basidiomycota
- Class: Agaricomycetes
- Order: Agaricales
- Family: Tricholomataceae
- Genus: Tricholoma
- Species: T. farinaceum

Binomial name
- Tricholoma farinaceum (Murrill) Murrill (1913)

Synonyms
- Melanoleuca farinacea Murrill (1913); Tricholoma farinaceum (Murrill) Sacc. & Trotter (1925)

Species of fungus

Tricholoma farinaceum is a mushroom of the agaric genus Tricholoma.

== See also ==
- List of North American Tricholoma
