= Tricholoma fulvimarginatum =

Scientific classification
- Domain: Eukaryota
- Kingdom: Fungi
- Division: Basidiomycota
- Class: Agaricomycetes
- Order: Agaricales
- Family: Tricholomataceae
- Genus: Tricholoma
- Species: T. fulvimarginatum

Binomial name
- Tricholoma fulvimarginatum Ovrebo & Halling (1986)

Species of fungus

Tricholoma fulvimarginatum is a mushroom of the agaric genus Tricholoma. Described as new to science in 1986, it is found in eastern North America.

== See also ==
- List of North American Tricholoma
- List of Tricholoma species
