= Tricholoma atrodiscum =

Scientific classification
- Domain: Eukaryota
- Kingdom: Fungi
- Division: Basidiomycota
- Class: Agaricomycetes
- Order: Agaricales
- Family: Tricholomataceae
- Genus: Tricholoma
- Species: T. atrodiscum

Binomial name
- Tricholoma atrodiscum Ovrebo (1989)

Species of fungus

Tricholoma atrodiscum is a mushroom of the agaric genus Tricholoma. It was described as new to science in 1989.

== See also ==
- List of North American Tricholoma
