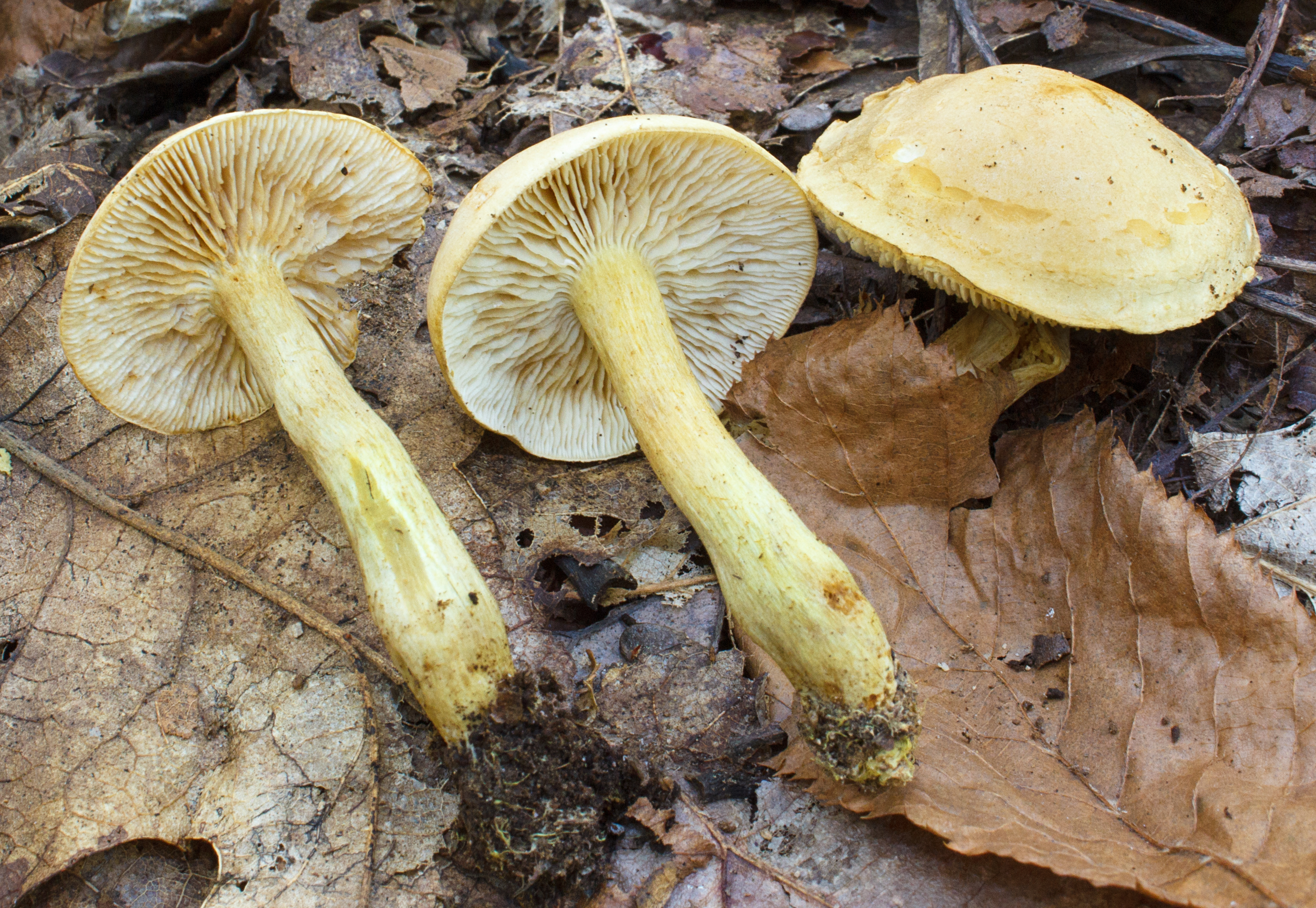

Scientific classification
- Kingdom: Fungi
- Division: Basidiomycota
- Class: Agaricomycetes
- Order: Agaricales
- Family: Tricholomataceae
- Genus: Tricholoma
- Species: T. odorum

Binomial name
- Tricholoma odorum Peck (1898)

Synonyms
- Melanoleuca odora (Peck) Murrill (1914)

= Tricholoma odorum =

Species of fungus

Tricholoma odorum is a mushroom of the agaric genus Tricholoma. It was formally described in 1898 by American mycologist Charles Horton Peck.

The caps are up to 6.5 centimetres (2 1/2 in) wide and fade from pale yellow to tan. The yellowish gills are close and the stem is up to 7 cm long. The taste is unpleasant and the spore print is white.

It is found in eastern North America from August to November.

It is considered inedible.

== See also ==
- List of North American Tricholoma
