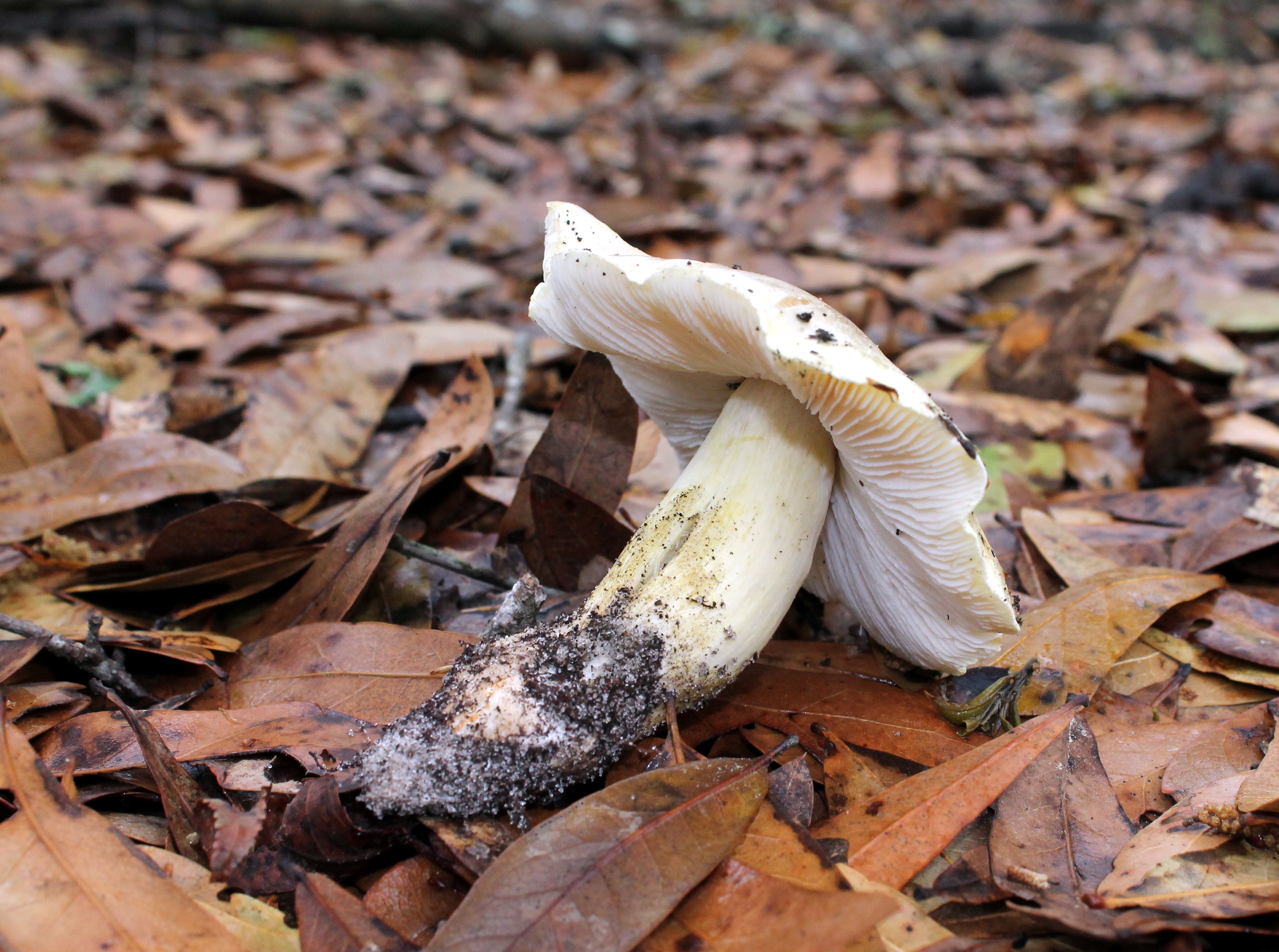

Scientific classification
- Kingdom: Fungi
- Division: Basidiomycota
- Class: Agaricomycetes
- Order: Agaricales
- Family: Tricholomataceae
- Genus: Tricholoma
- Species: T. floridanum

Binomial name
- Tricholoma floridanum (Murrill) Murrill (1945)

Synonyms
- Melanoleuca floridana Murrill (1945)

= Tricholoma floridanum =

Species of mushroom

Tricholoma floridanum is a mushroom of the agaric genus Tricholoma. It was first formally described by William Alphonso Murrill in 1945.

== See also ==
- List of North American Tricholoma
