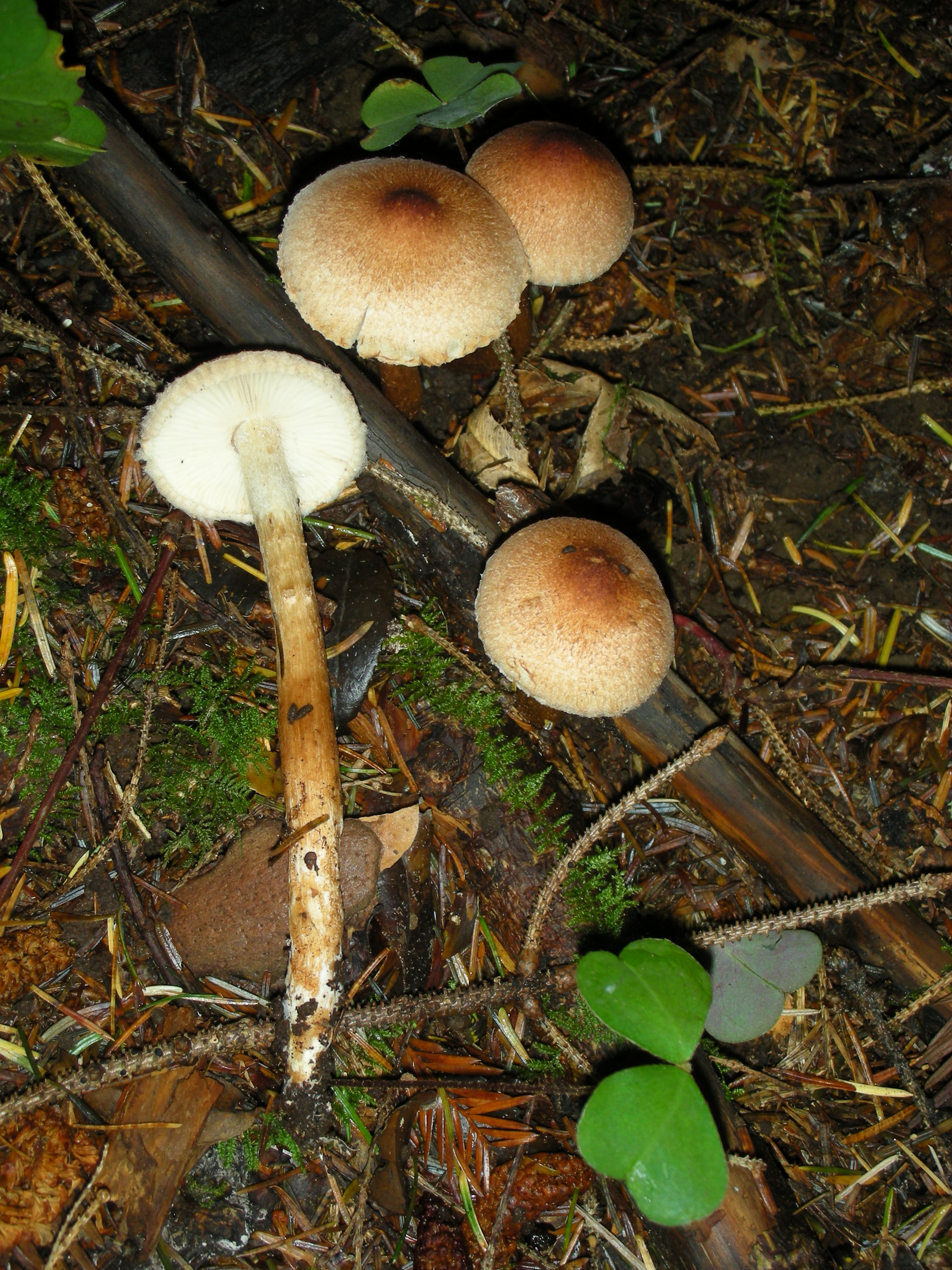

Scientific classification
- Domain: Eukaryota
- Kingdom: Fungi
- Division: Basidiomycota
- Class: Agaricomycetes
- Order: Agaricales
- Family: Tricholomataceae
- Genus: Tricholoma
- Species: T. aurantio-olivaceum

Binomial name
- Tricholoma aurantio-olivaceum A.H.Sm. (1944)

= Tricholoma aurantio-olivaceum =

Species of fungus

Tricholoma aurantio-olivaceum is a mushroom of the agaric genus Tricholoma. It was first formally described by American mycologist Alexander H. Smith in 1944.

== See also ==
- List of North American Tricholoma
- List of Tricholoma species
