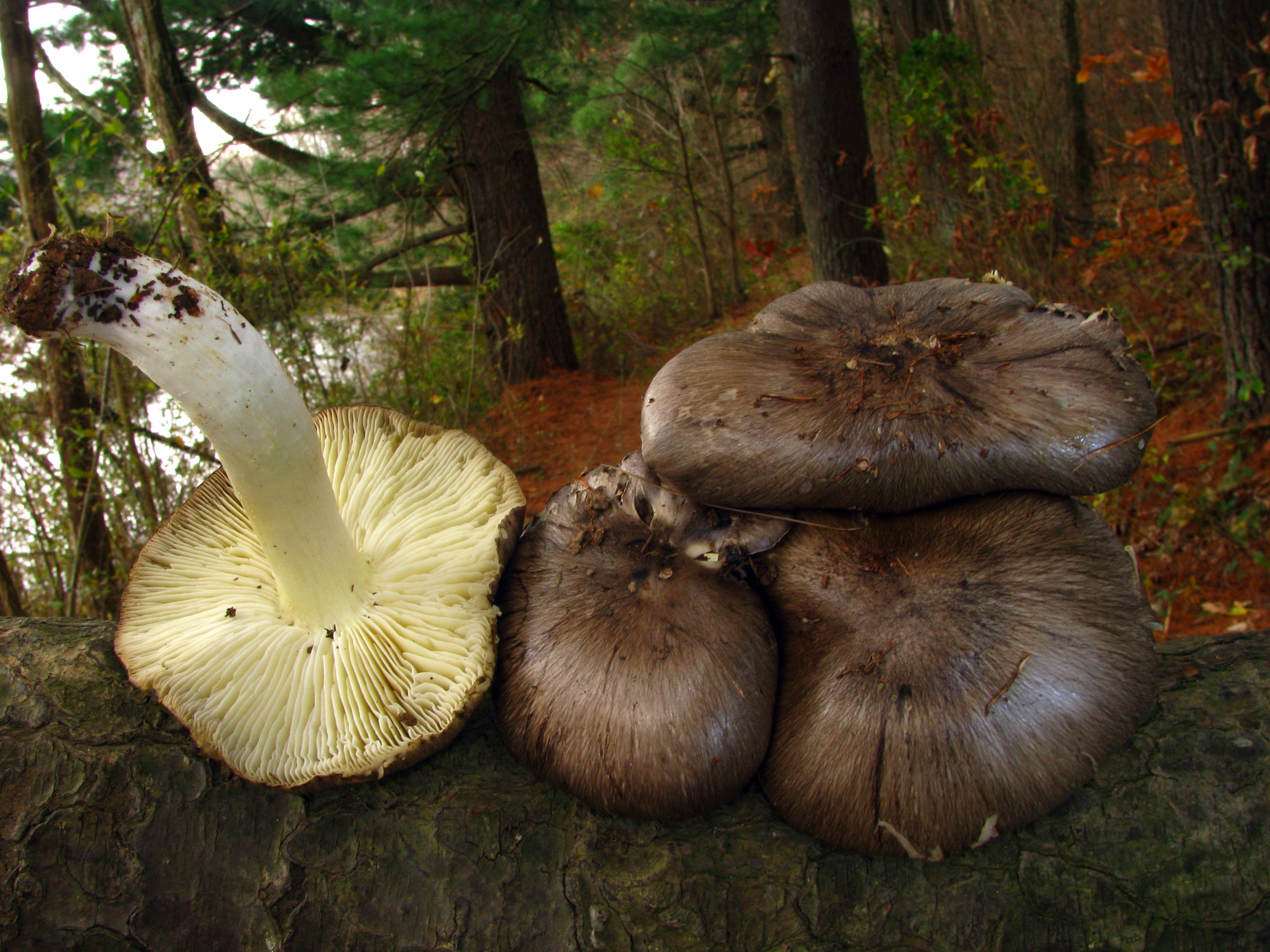

Scientific classification
- Kingdom: Fungi
- Division: Basidiomycota
- Class: Agaricomycetes
- Order: Agaricales
- Family: Tricholomataceae
- Genus: Tricholoma
- Species: T. portentosum

Binomial name
- Tricholoma portentosum (Fr.) Quél. (1873)

Synonyms
- Agaricus portentosus Fr. (1821); Gyrophila portentosa (Fr.) Quél. (1886); Gyrophila sejuncta var. portentosa (Fr.) Quél. (1896); Melanoleuca portentosa (Fr.) Murrill (1914)

= Tricholoma portentosum =

Species of fungus

Tricholoma portentosum
- Mycological characteristics
- Gills on hymenium
- Cap is convex
- Hymenium is adnate
- Stipe is bare
- Spore print is white
- Ecology is mycorrhizal
- Edibility is edible

Tricholoma portentosum, commonly known as the charbonnier, streaked tricholoma, gray-streaked trich, or sooty head, is a grey-capped mushroom of the large genus Tricholoma. It is found in woodlands in Europe and North America. It is edible but resembles some that are not.

== Taxonomy ==
The species was originally described as Agaricus portentosus by Elias Magnus Fries in 1821, before being placed in the genus Tricholoma by Lucien Quélet in 1872. At least three varieties have been described: var. album has an all white cap, var. lugdunense has a paler cap, and var. boutevillei has a very dark cap and is the form which grows with oak and beech.

=== Etymology ===
The genus name Tricholoma comes from the Ancient Greek θρίξ (trix), τριχός (trichos), "hair", and λῶμα (lôma), "fringe", and refers to the fibrils on the caps of many species of the genus. The species epithet, portentosum, comes from the Latin portentosus, meaning marvellous or prodigious, and describes its taste.

== Description ==
It is a large, imposing mushroom, with a convex cap 3–11 cm (1–4.5 in) in diameter with a boss. The cap is sticky when wet and has an irregularly lobed margin. It is dark grey in colour with darker grey to blackish streaks perpendicular to the margins. The grey colour fades towards the margins and may be tinged with yellow or purple. The crowded, adnate gills are white, and the solid stipe is white with a yellow tinge at the top. It measures 3.5–12 cm (1.4–4.7 in) high and 1–3 cm (0.4–1.2 in) wide. The spore print is white.

It has a farinaceous smell and taste.

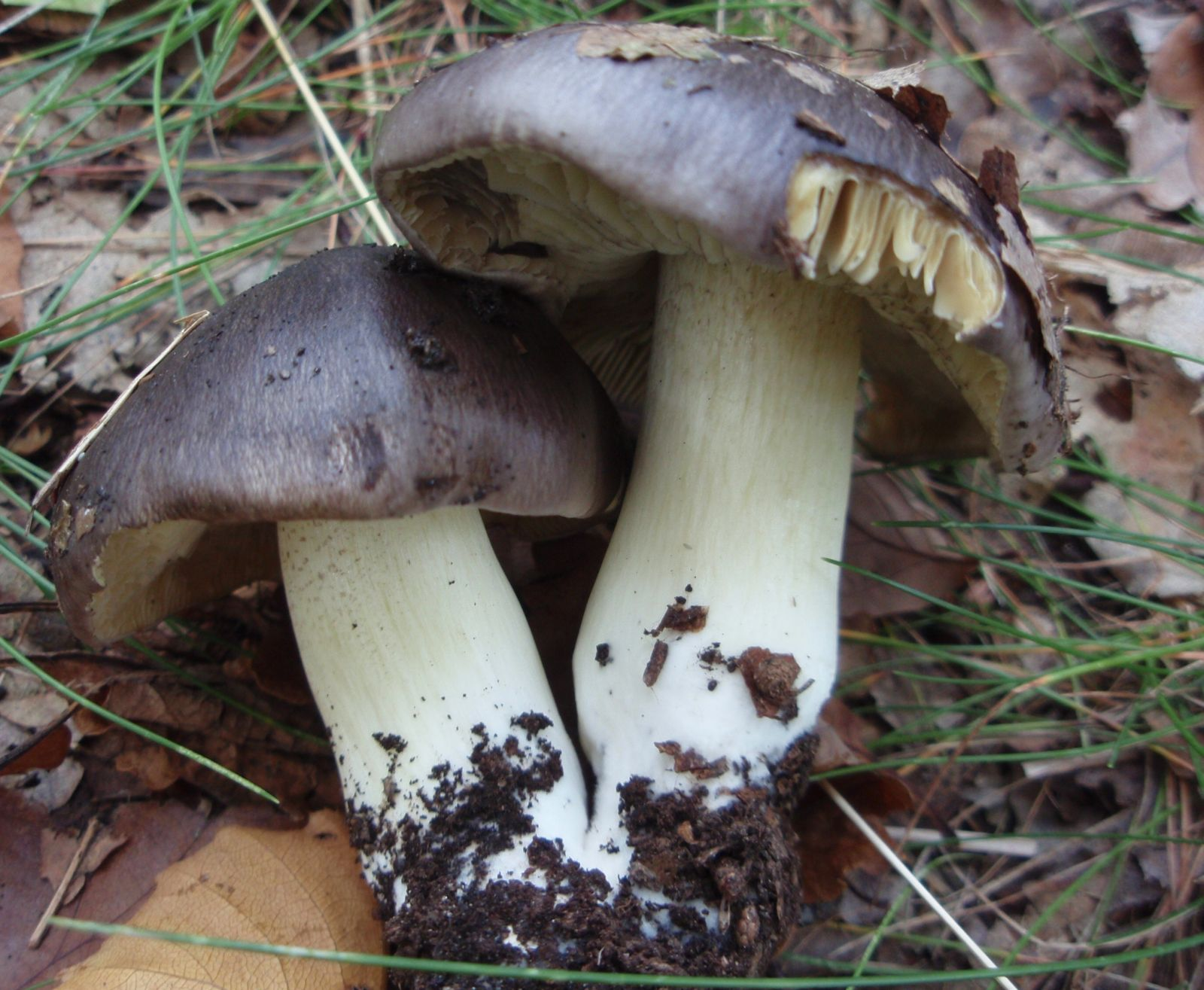
Fruiting bodies

=== Similar species ===
The inedible Tricholoma virgatum has a silvery-grey cap and grows in mixed woodland, and smells of damp earth and has a bitter taste. The poisonous T. pardinum has prominent grey scales giving the cap a shaggy or striped appearance.

== Habitat and distribution ==
The fruit bodies appear in late autumn in coniferous woodland in Europe and North America. Ectomycorrhizal, it is most commonly associated with Pinus sylvestris, but also sometimes oak (Quercus) or beech (Fagus) on sandy soils. It has been declining since the 1980s in the Netherlands and is now rare there, and uncommon in Britain but is common in France where it is sometime seen in wild mushroom markets.

Tricholoma portentosum is a holarctic species, and, according to a 2017 study, has the same genetic profile on the three continents on which it is found. In Western Europe, it remains common in Scotland, France, the Northern Iberian Peninsula, and Italy. It is equally common in Central Europe, specifically Germany, Czech Republic, Slovakia and Slovenia, and in Eastern Europe, where it is found in Estonia, Belarus, Bulgaria, Ukraine and Russia. In North America, it is common in the east, notably in Quebec, New Hampshire, Maine, Massachusetts, and in Connecticut. In Asia, it is well represented in Russia, Kyrgyzstan, China, and Japan.

== Ecology ==
Older specimens are often eaten by slugs.

== Uses ==
It is highly regarded as an edible mushroom, but is not recommended by some due to its similarity to hazardous species.

The stem is recommended to be removed before cooking. It can be pickled.

== See also ==
- List of North American Tricholoma
- List of Tricholoma species
