= List of North American Tricholoma species =

This is a list of Tricholoma species found in North America.

- Tricholoma acre
- Tricholoma aestuans
- Tricholoma albidum
- Tricholoma apium - scented knight
- Tricholoma argenteum
- Tricholoma arvernense
- Tricholoma atrodiscum
- Tricholoma atrosquamosum - dark scaled knight
- Tricholoma atroviolaceum
- Tricholoma aurantio-olivaceum
- Tricholoma aurantium - orange knight
- Tricholoma caligatum
- Tricholoma cingulatum - girdled knight
- Tricholoma colossus - giant knight
- Tricholoma davisiae
- Tricholoma dryophilum
- Tricholoma equestre - yellow knight
- Tricholoma farinaceum
- Tricholoma floridanum
- Tricholoma focale - booted knight
- Tricholoma fracticum
- Tricholoma fulvimarginatum
- Tricholoma fulvum - birch knight
- Tricholoma fumosoluteum
- Tricholoma griseoviolaceum
- Tricholoma hordum
- Tricholoma huronense
- Tricholoma imbricatum - matt knight
- Tricholoma inamoenum
- Tricholoma insigne
- Tricholoma intermedium
- Tricholoma luteomaculosum
- Tricholoma magnivelare
- Tricholoma manzanitae
- Tricholoma marquettense
- Tricholoma moseri
- Tricholoma muricatum
- Tricholoma mutabile
- Tricholoma myomyces
- Tricholoma nigrum
- Tricholoma niveipes
- Tricholoma odorum
- Tricholoma olivaceobrunneum
- Tricholoma palustre
- Tricholoma pardinum
- Tricholoma pessundatum
- Tricholoma populinum - poplar knight
- Tricholoma portentosum
- Tricholoma pullum
- Tricholoma roseoacerbum
- Tricholoma saponaceum - soapy knight
- Tricholoma sculpturatum - yellowing knight (now a redirect)
- Tricholoma sejunctum - deceiving knight
- Tricholoma serratifolium
- Tricholoma silvaticoides
- Tricholoma squarrulosum
- Tricholoma subaureum
- Tricholoma subluteum
- Tricholoma subresplendens
- Tricholoma sulphurescens
- Tricholoma sulphureum - sulphur knight
- Tricholoma terreum - grey knight
- Tricholoma transmutans
- Tricholoma tumidum
- Tricholoma ustale - burnt knight
- Tricholoma vaccinum - scaly knight
- Tricholoma venenatum
- Tricholoma vernaticum
- Tricholoma virgatum - ashen knight
