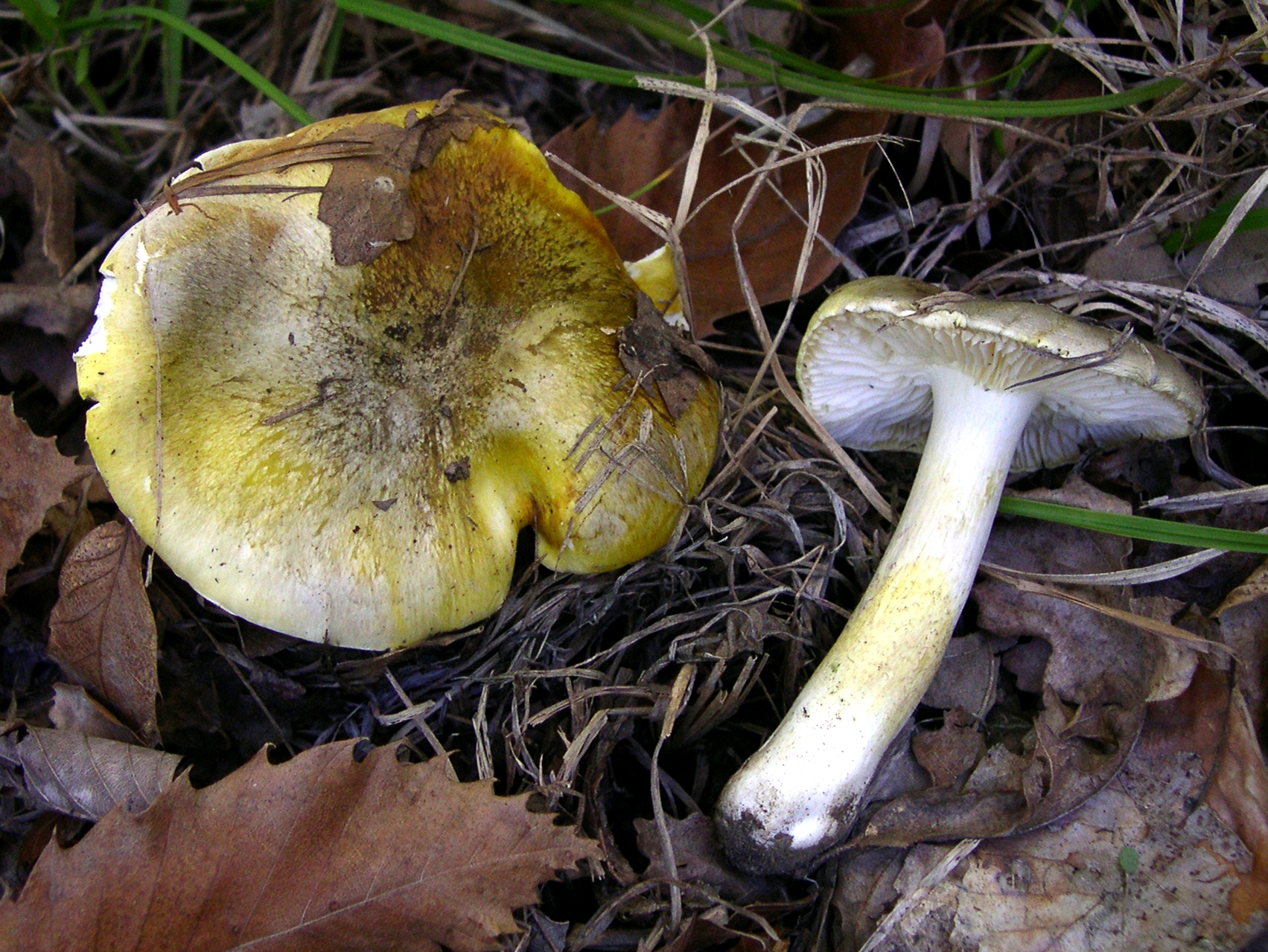

Scientific classification
- Domain: Eukaryota
- Kingdom: Fungi
- Division: Basidiomycota
- Class: Agaricomycetes
- Order: Agaricales
- Family: Tricholomataceae
- Genus: Tricholoma
- Species: T. sejunctum

Binomial name
- Tricholoma sejunctum (Sowerby) Quél. (1872)

Synonyms
- Agaricus sejunctus Sowerby (1799)

= Tricholoma sejunctum =

Species of fungus

Tricholoma sejunctum Mycological characteristics
- Gills on hymenium
- Cap is convex
- Hymenium is adnexed
- Stipe is bare
- Spore print is white
- Ecology is mycorrhizal
- Edibility is unknown

Tricholoma sejunctum (colloquially yellow blusher in the eastern regions of North America) is a mushroom that appears across much of the Northern Hemisphere and is associated with pine forests.

== Description ==
The cap is 3–8 centimetres (1 1/4–3 1/4 in) wide, greenish-brownish yellow, and slightly moist; it has dark fibrils near the center. The gills and stipe are whitish-yellow, the latter growing up to 10 centimetres (4 in) long. The odor is mild to mealy and the taste mild to unpleasant.

=== Similar species ===
Tricholoma flavovirens is usually larger and fleshier, with more solid yellow gills and stipe and a less fibrillose cap. Other similar species include Tricholoma arvernense, and T. viridilutescens.

== Distribution and habitat ==
In North America, it appears on the Northwest coast and in the east.

== Edibility ==
There is some confusion as to the certain identification of the species, so it is considered unsafe for eating. While classified as inedible by some field guides, it seems to have been traditionally consumed in much of world without noted ill effects. More recently, in Europe it has been identified as responsible for poisonings.

The species is reportedly consumed in China's Yunnan province, where it is generally known as 荞面菌 (Pinyin: qiao mian jun; lit. 'Buckwheat Noodle Mushroom') on account of this property, despite the fact that its proper name is 黄绿口蘑 (lit. 'Yellow Green Mouth Mushroom').

== See also ==
- List of North American Tricholoma
- List of Tricholoma species
