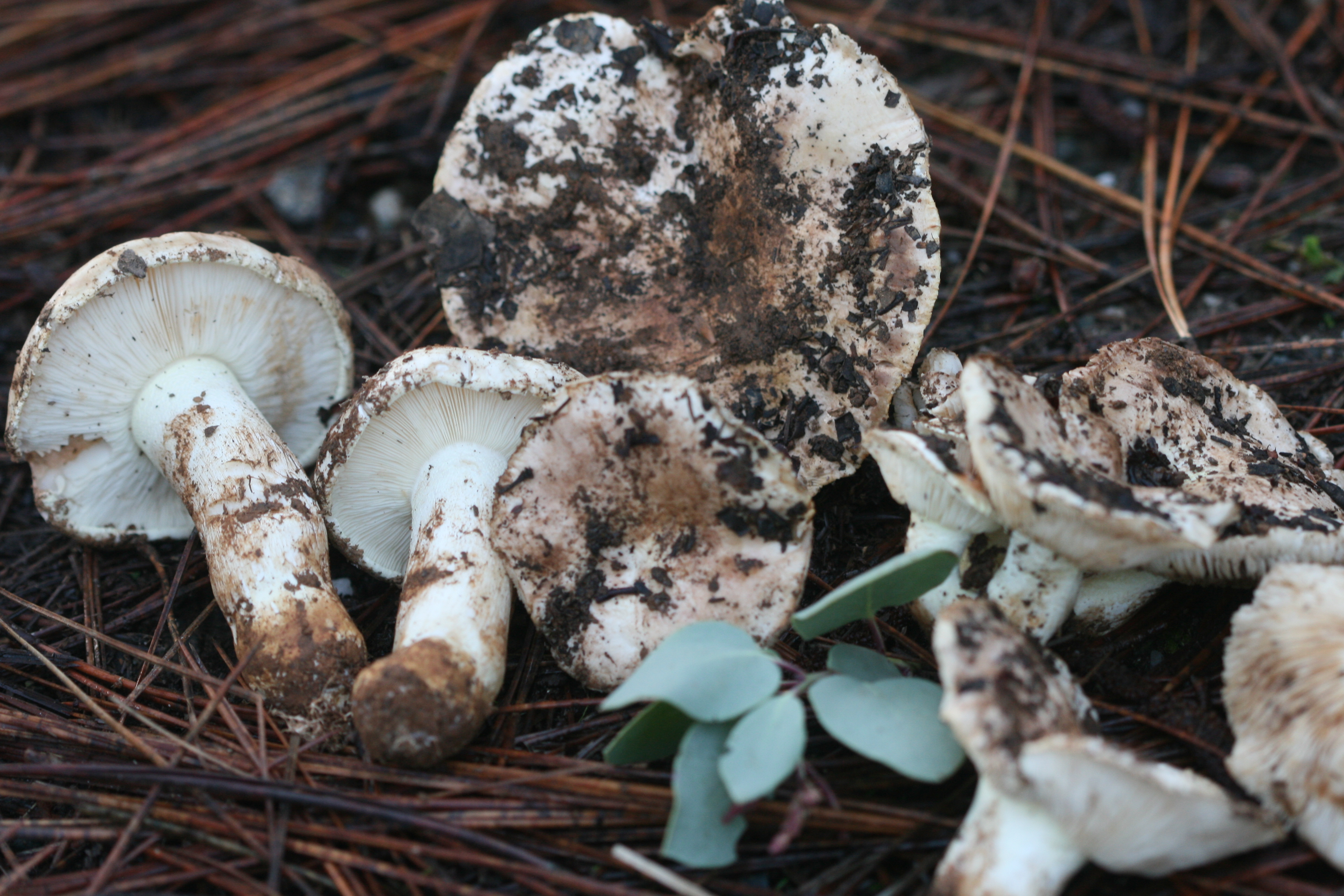

Scientific classification
- Domain: Eukaryota
- Kingdom: Fungi
- Division: Basidiomycota
- Class: Agaricomycetes
- Order: Agaricales
- Family: Tricholomataceae
- Genus: Tricholoma
- Species: T. manzanitae

Binomial name
- Tricholoma manzanitae T.J.Baroni & Ovrebo (1983)

= Tricholoma manzanitae =

Species of fungus

Tricholoma manzanitae is a mushroom of the agaric genus Tricholoma. It was formally described in 1983.

== See also ==
- List of North American Tricholoma
- List of Tricholoma species
