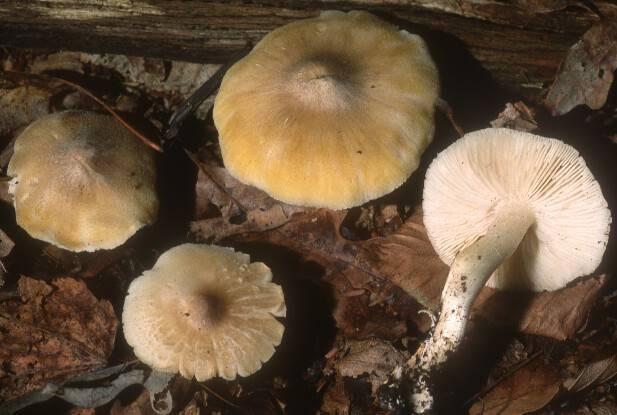

Scientific classification
- Kingdom: Fungi
- Division: Basidiomycota
- Class: Agaricomycetes
- Order: Agaricales
- Family: Tricholomataceae
- Genus: Tricholoma
- Species: T. davisiae

Binomial name
- Tricholoma davisiae Peck (1900)

Synonyms
- Melanoleuca davisiae (Peck) Murrill (1914)

= Tricholoma davisiae =

Species of fungus

Tricholoma davisiae is a mushroom of the agaric genus Tricholoma. It was first formally described by Charles Horton Peck in 1900.

== See also ==
- List of North American Tricholoma
