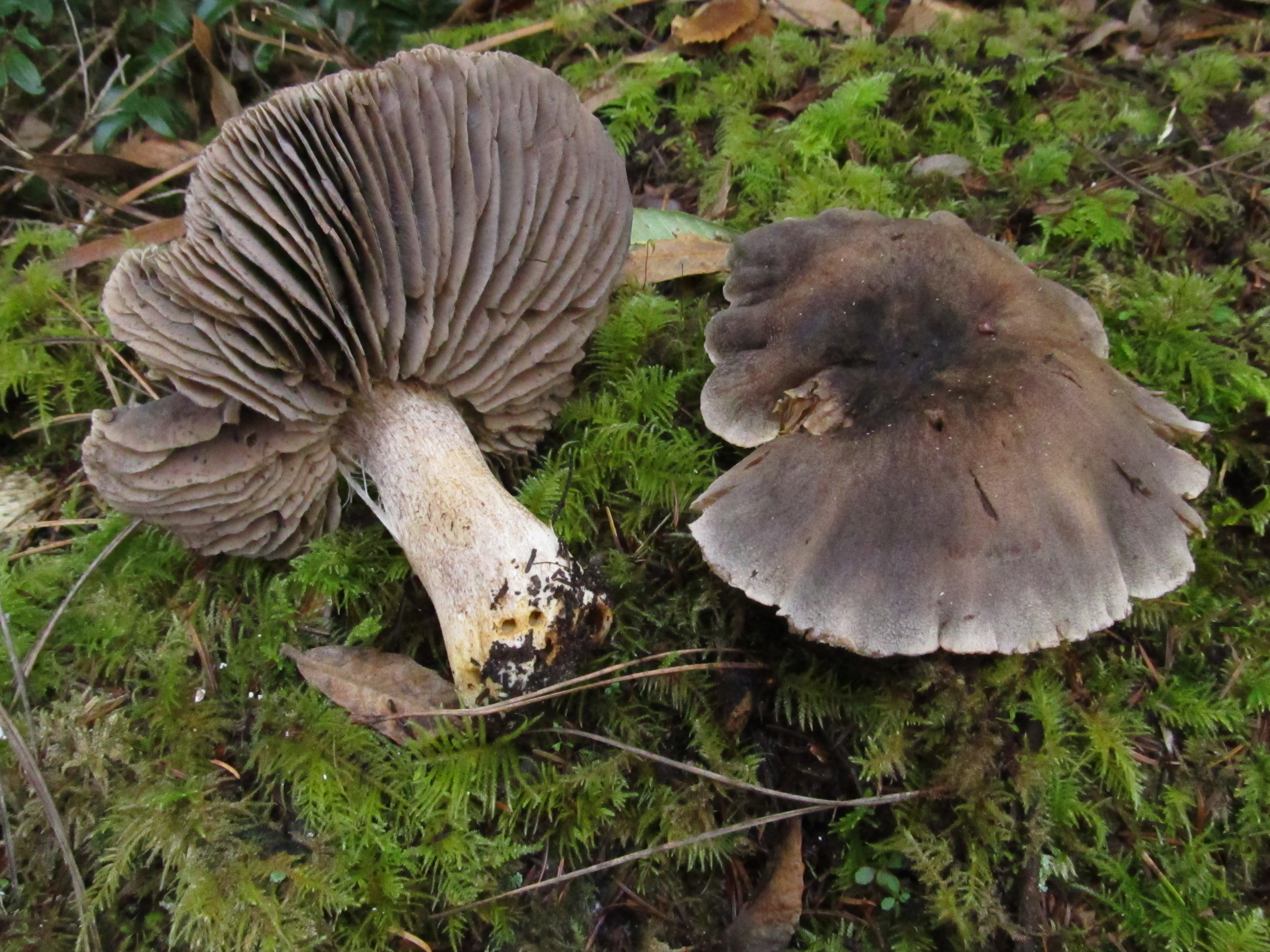

Scientific classification
- Kingdom: Fungi
- Division: Basidiomycota
- Class: Agaricomycetes
- Order: Agaricales
- Family: Tricholomataceae
- Genus: Tricholoma
- Species: T. luteomaculosum

Binomial name
- Tricholoma luteomaculosum A.H.Sm. (1942)

= Tricholoma luteomaculosum =

Species of fungus

Tricholoma luteomaculosum is a mushroom of the agaric genus Tricholoma. It was first formally described by American mycologist Alexander H. Smith in 1942.

== See also ==
- List of North American Tricholoma
