= Tricholoma hordum =

Scientific classification
- Kingdom: Fungi
- Division: Basidiomycota
- Class: Agaricomycetes
- Order: Agaricales
- Family: Tricholomataceae
- Genus: Tricholoma
- Species: T. hordum

Binomial name
- Tricholoma hordum Tricholoma hordum (Fr.) Quél. (1872)

Synonyms
- Agaricus hordus Fr. (1821); Gyrophila horda (Fr.) Quél. (1886)

Species of fungus

Tricholoma hordum is a mushroom of the agaric genus Tricholoma.

== See also ==
- List of North American Tricholoma
