= Tricholoma atroviolaceum =

Scientific classification
- Kingdom: Fungi
- Division: Basidiomycota
- Class: Agaricomycetes
- Order: Agaricales
- Family: Tricholomataceae
- Genus: Tricholoma
- Species: T. atroviolaceum

Binomial name
- Tricholoma atroviolaceum A.H.Sm. (1944)

Species of fungus

Tricholoma atroviolaceum is a mushroom of the agaric genus Tricholoma. It is from the fungi kingdom. It was described as new to science by American mycologist Alexander H. Smith in 1944. The mushroom seems to be exclusive to the Pacific coast of North America; it can be found in the Pacific Northwest under conifers, usually in sparse quantities.

The cap is broadly convex to flat with a hard texture, covered with purplish gray-brown fibrous scales. The flesh tends to stain red-gray. The gills are pinkish-gray. The stipe is thick, sometimes larger at the base, and browns with age. The flesh has a starchy odor and slightly bitter taste. The gills are notched, though they can sometimes appear free.

== See also ==
- List of North American Tricholoma
- List of Tricholoma species
