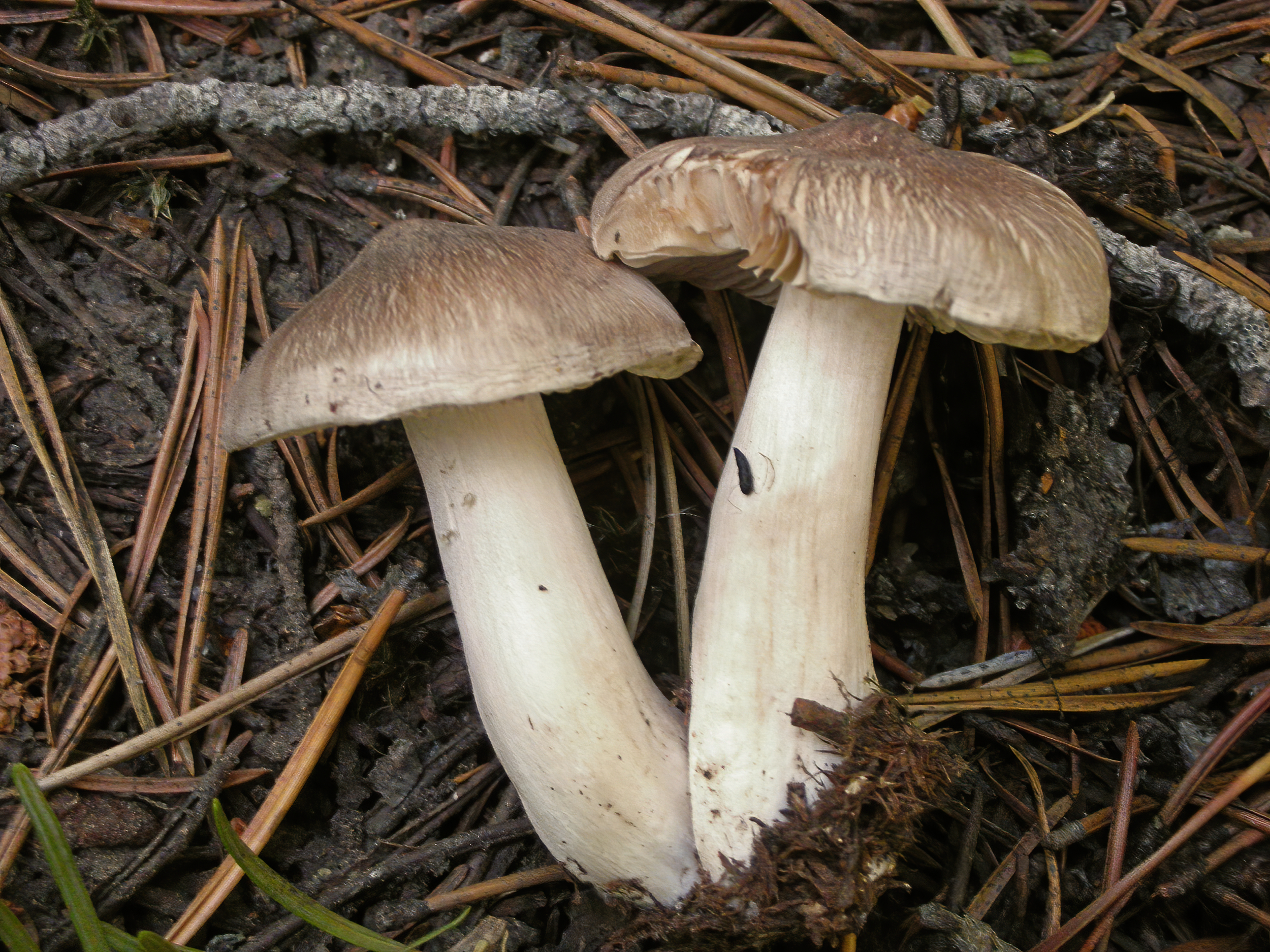

Scientific classification
- Kingdom: Fungi
- Division: Basidiomycota
- Class: Agaricomycetes
- Order: Agaricales
- Family: Tricholomataceae
- Genus: Tricholoma
- Species: T. virgatum

Binomial name
- Tricholoma virgatum (Fr.) P.Kumm. (1871)

Synonyms
- Agaricus virgatus Fr. (1818); Agaricus fumosus subsp. virgatus (Fr.) Pers. (1828); Gyrophila virgata (Fr.) Quél. (1886)

= Tricholoma virgatum =

Species of fungus

Tricholoma virgatum
- Mycological characteristics
- Gills on hymenium
- Cap is conical
- Hymenium is adnexed
- Stipe is bare
- Spore print is white
- Ecology is mycorrhizal
- Edibility is inedible or poisonous

Tricholoma virgatum, commonly known as the ashen knight, is a mushroom of the agaric genus Tricholoma.

== Taxonomy ==
It was first described scientifically as Agaricus virgatus by Elias Fries in 1818, and later transferred to the genus Tricholoma by Paul Kummer in 1871.

== Description ==
The grayish cap is conical, with radiating streaks of fibres. It is up to 10 centimetres (4 in) across. The stipe is lighter and up to 15 cm long. The odour is mild to mealy and the taste acrid. The spore print is white.

Similar species in the genus include T. sciodes.

== Distribution and habitat ==
It is found in the deciduous and coniferous forests of China, Europe, and North America.

== Edibility ==
The mushroom is considered inedible and possibly poisonous.

== Uses ==
Recent studies done on this mushroom have shown that its extract, after being submerged in methanol, can be effective in the prevention of diseases. This is due to the extract being antibacterial.

== See also ==
- List of North American Tricholoma
- List of Tricholoma species
