= List of Tricholomataceae genera =

The Tricholomataceae are a family of fungi in the order Agaricales. A 2008 estimate placed 78 genera and 1020 species in the family. Subsequent molecular research, based on cladistic analysis of DNA sequences, has however found that this wide interpretation of the Tricholomataceae renders the family polyphyletic and is no longer tenable.

In 2014, Sánchez-García and colleagues proposed a revised classification of the Tricholomataceae with just seven genera: Leucopaxillus, Tricholoma, Dennisiomyces, Porpoloma, and the newly circumscribed genera Corneriella, Pogonoloma (now moved to the Pseudoclitocybaceae), and Pseudotricholoma.

Of the genera formerly placed in the Tricholomataceae, Amparoina is considered a synonym of Mycena; Callistosporium (with Pleurocollybia as a synonym) and Macrocybe have been moved to the Callistosporiaceae; Catathelasma has been moved to the Biannulariaceae; Phyllotopsis and Tricholomopsis to the Phyllotopsidaceae; Leucopholiota and Squamanita to the Squamanitaceae; Pseudoclitocybe, Musumecia, and Pogonoloma to the Pseudoclitocybaceae; Cantharellopsis to the Rickenellaceae; Arthromyces to the Lyophyllaceae; and Hygroaster and Melanomphalia to the Hygrophoraceae.

Following changes to the International Code of Nomenclature for algae, fungi, and plants, the practice of giving different names to teleomorph and anamorph forms of the same fungus has been discontinued. As a result two anamorphic genera referred to the Tricholomataceae become synonyms of their teleomorphs: Tilachlidiopsis becomes a synonym of Dendrocollybia and Nothoclavulina a synonym of Arthrosporella.

Currently (2023) the following ten genera are accepted in the Tricholomataceae sensu stricto: Albomagister, Corneriella, Dennisiomyces, Dermoloma, Leucopaxillus, Porpoloma, Pseudobaeospora, Pseudoporpoloma, Pseudotricholoma, and Tricholoma. An additional eleven genera are related, but not yet assigned to a family, and further genera await research. All are listed below.

== Genera ==
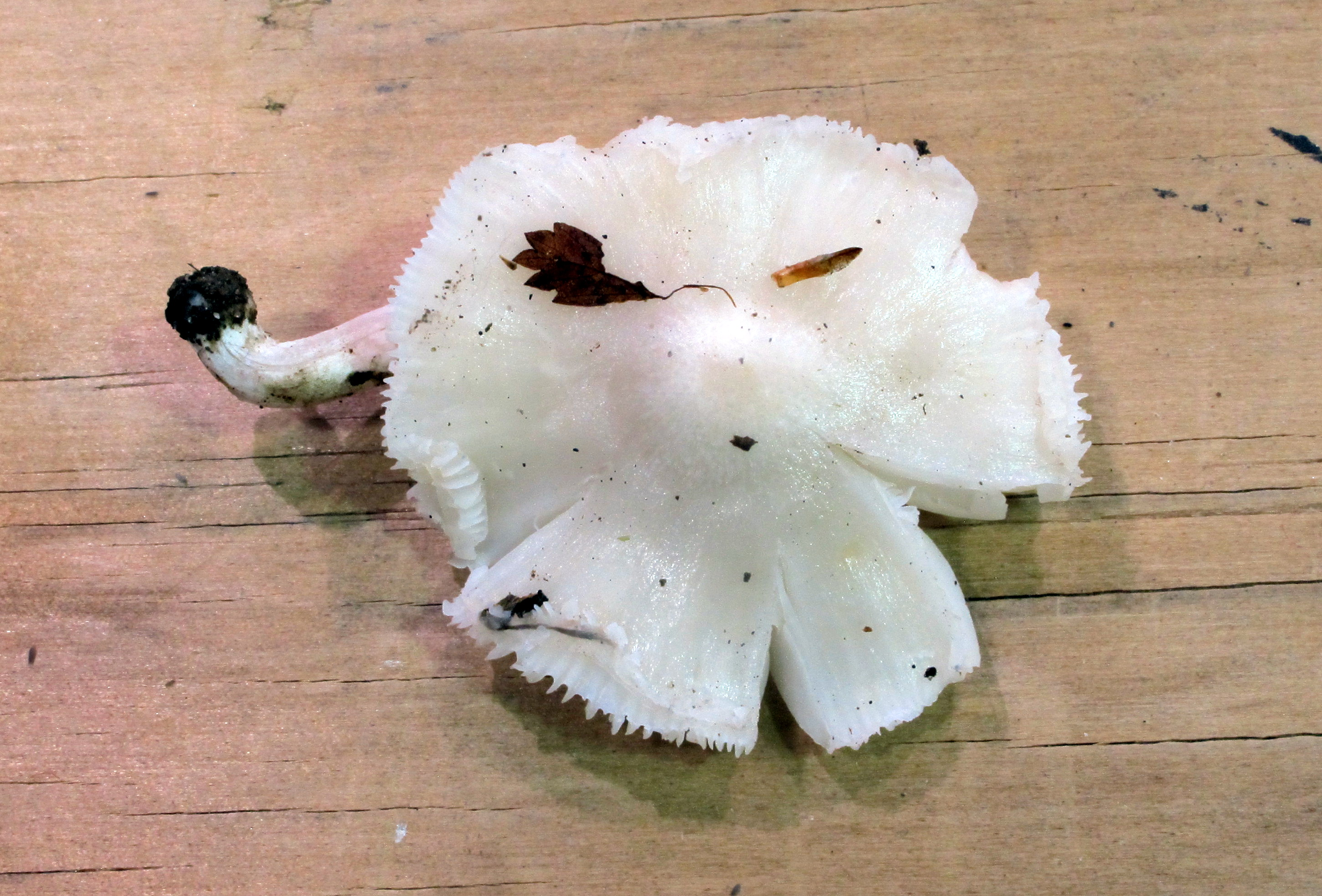
Albomagister subaustralis

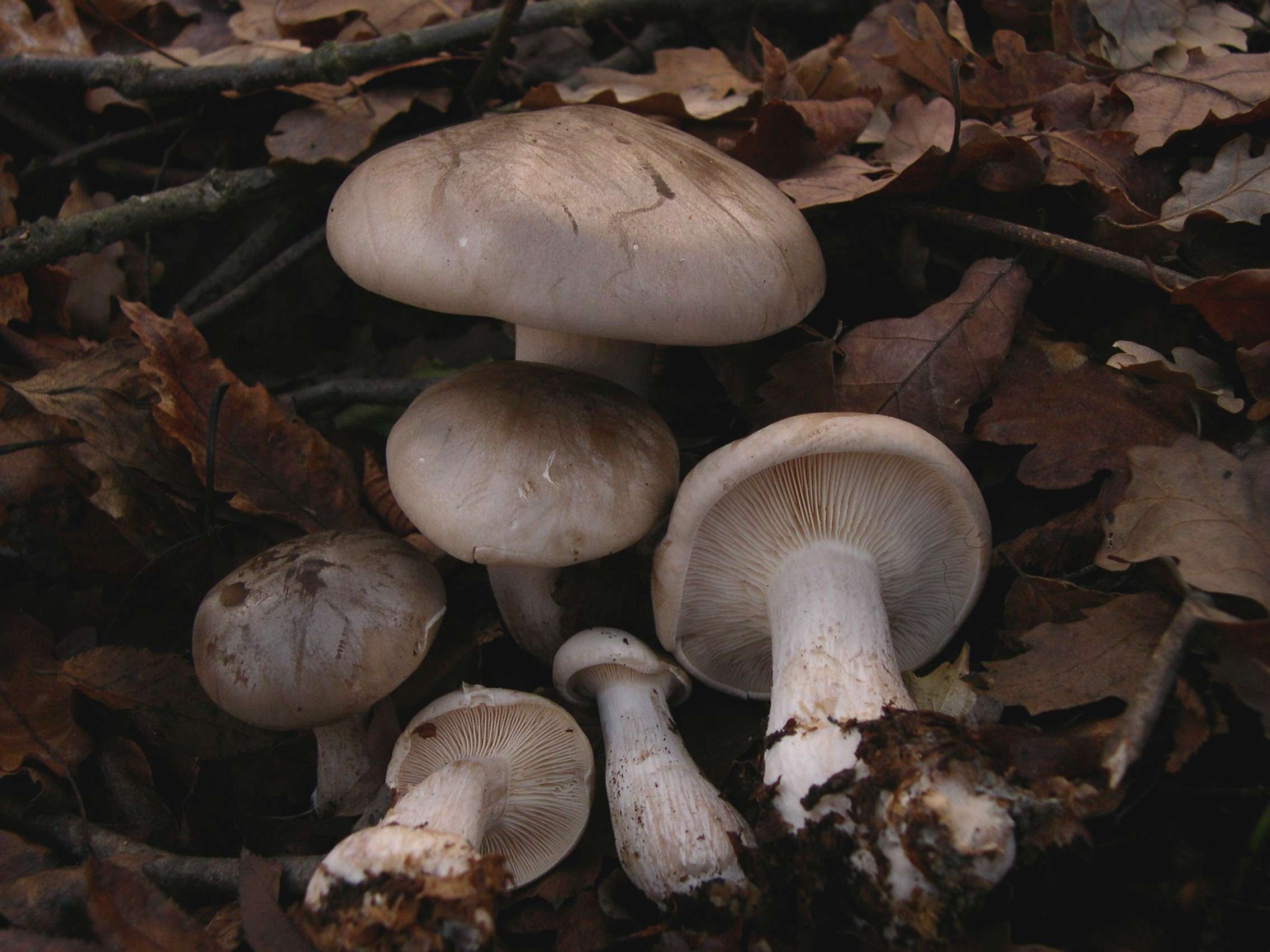
Clitocybe nebularis

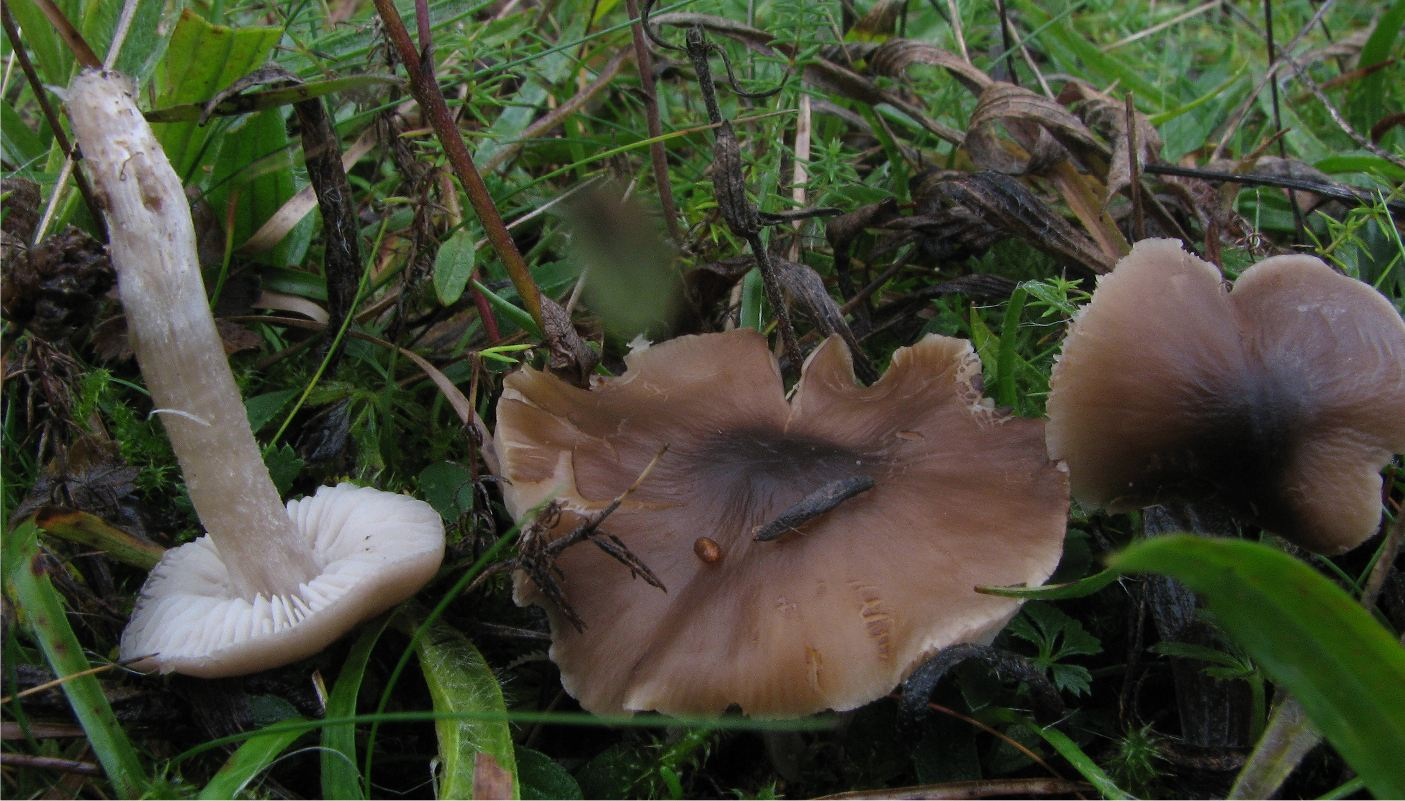
Dermoloma cuneifolium

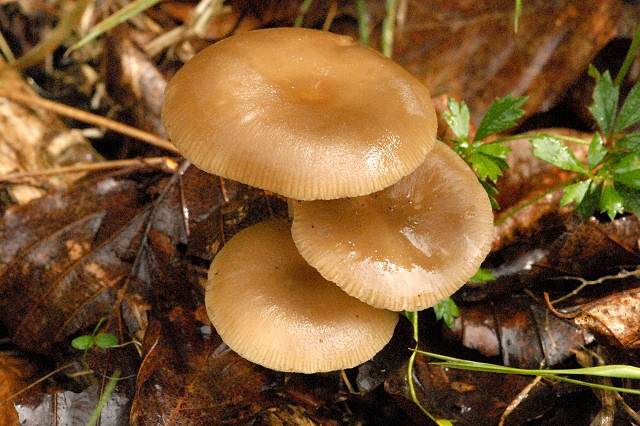
Fayodia pseudoclusilis

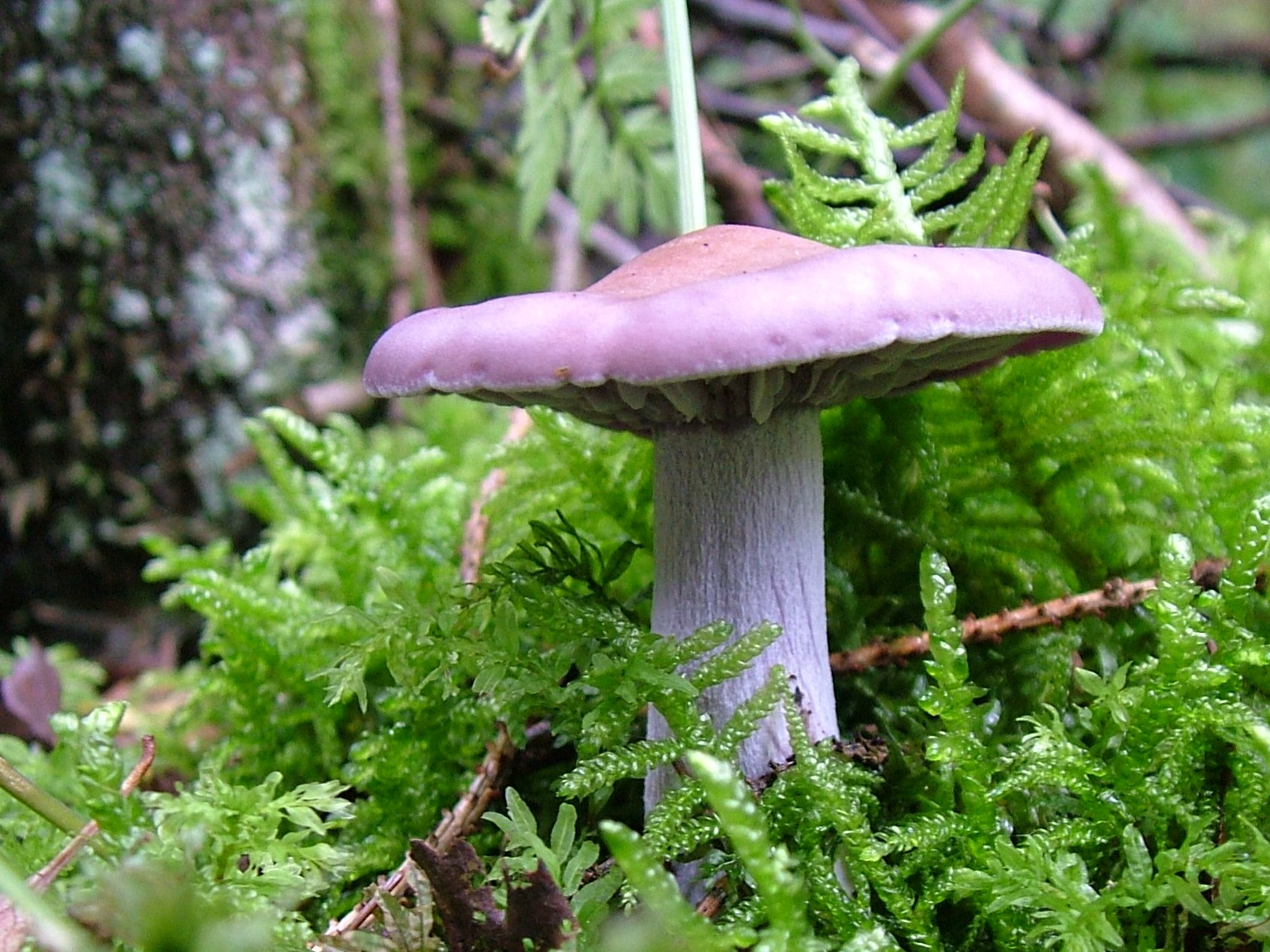
Lepista nuda

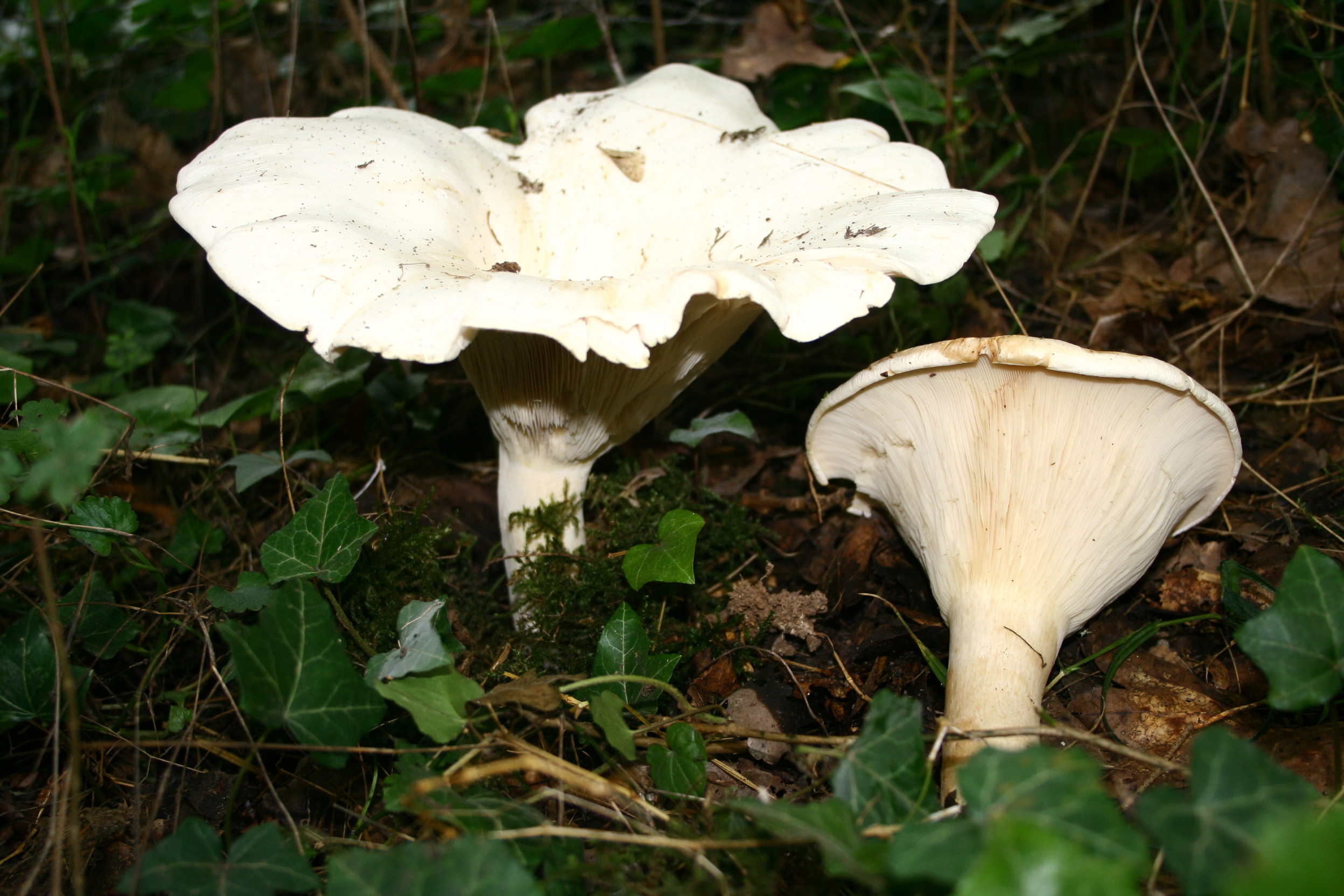
Leucopaxillus giganteus

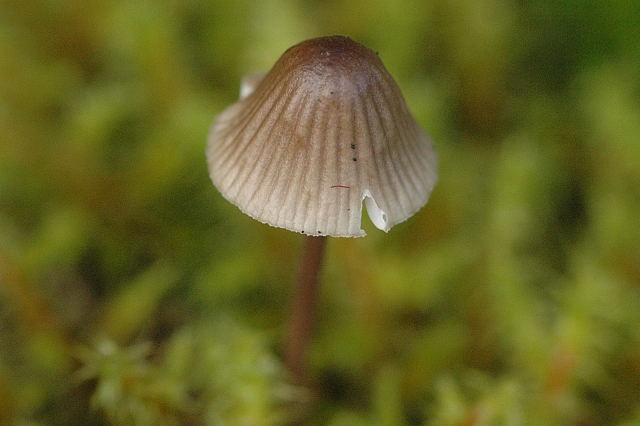
Mycenella bryophila

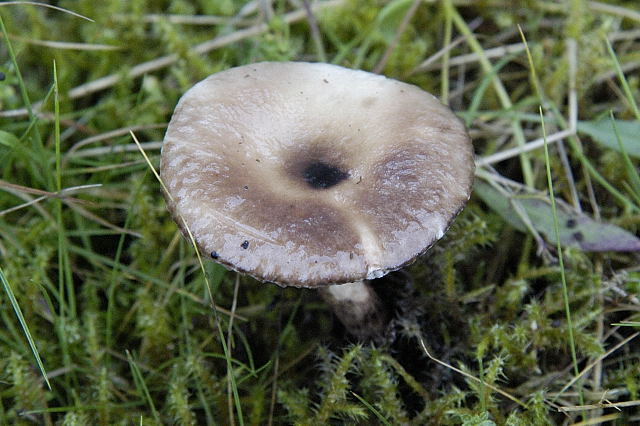
Omphalina griseopallida

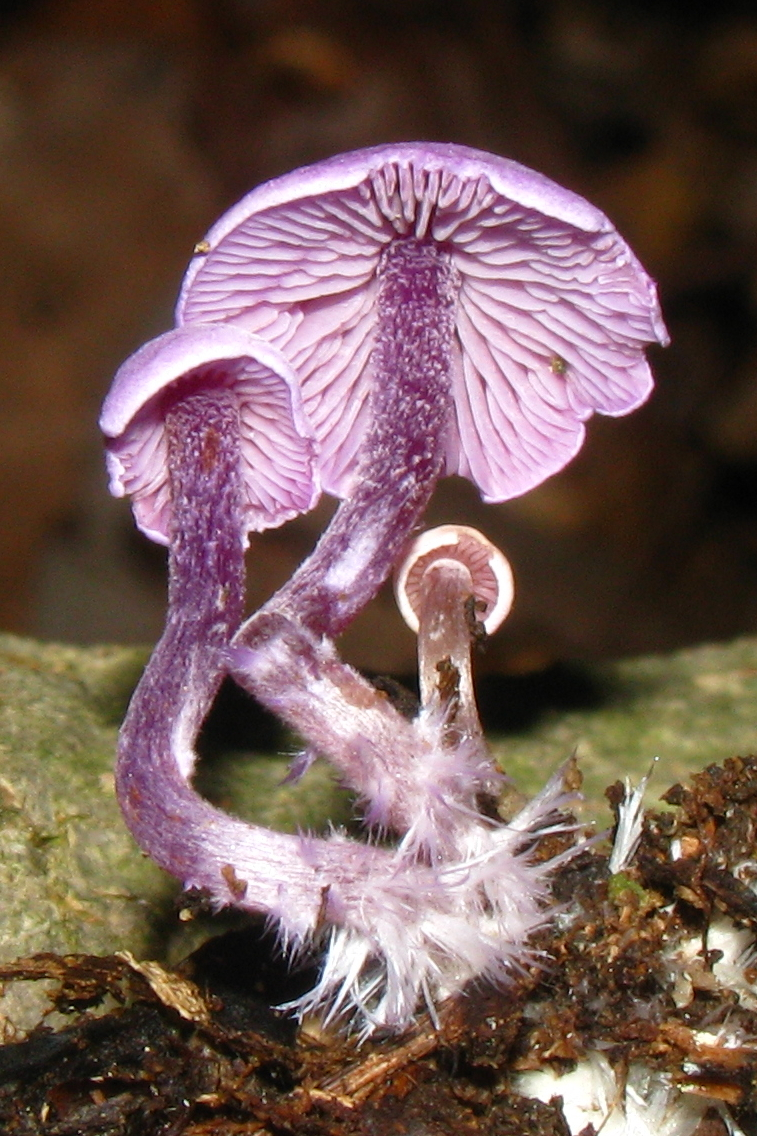
Pseudobaeospora sp.

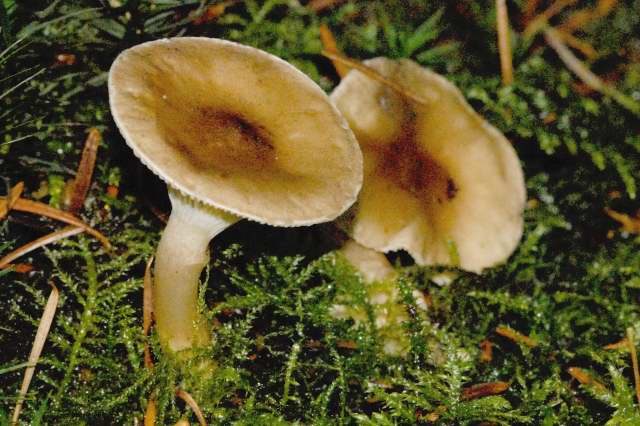
Pseudoomphalina pachyphylla

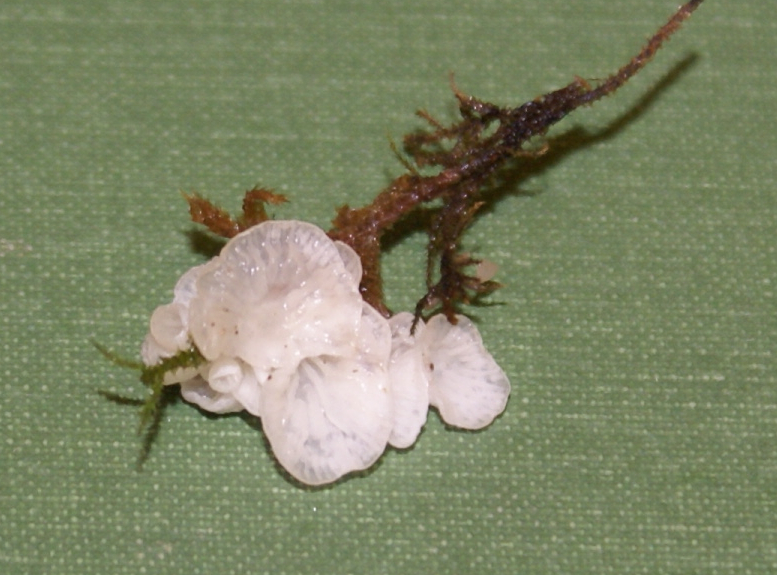
Rimbachia bryophila

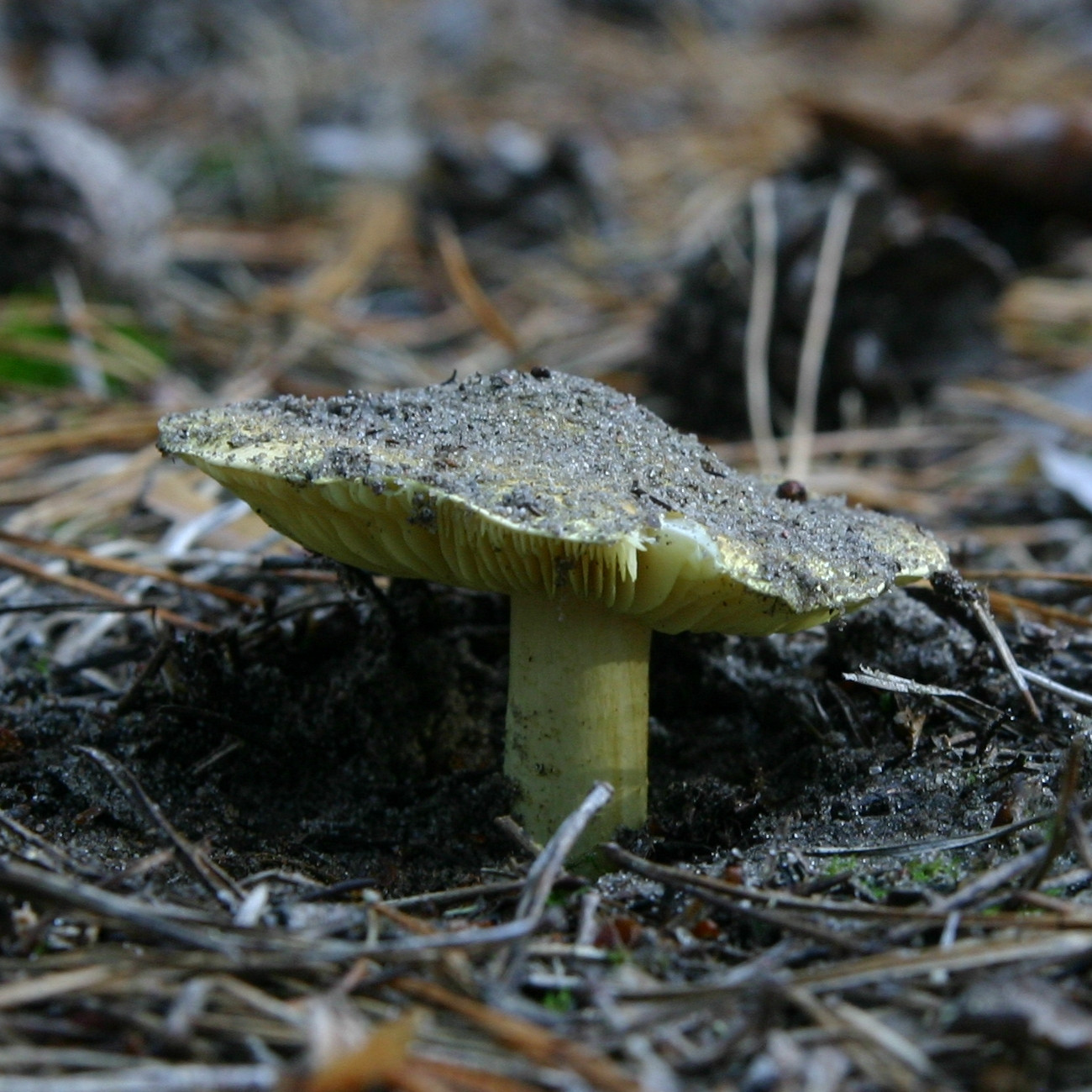
Tricholoma equestre

Genus	Year	Type species	# of species	Distribution
Albomagister; Sánchez-García, Birkebak & Matheny	2014	Albomagister subaustralis (A.H.Sm. & Hesler) Sánchez-García, Birkebak & Matheny	3	Europe, United States
†Archaeomarasmius; Hibbett et al.	1997	Archaeomarasmius leggetti Hibbett et al.	1	Extinct, Turonian New Jersey amber
Arthrosporella; Singer	1970	Arthrosporella ditopa (Singer) Singer	1	Argentina
Asproinocybe; R.Heim	1970	Asproinocybe lactifera R.Heim	5	Africa (tropical)
Austroclitocybe; Raithelh.	1972	Austroclitocybe veronicae Raithelh.	1	South America (temperate)
Austroomphaliaster; Garrido	1988	Austroomphaliaster nahuelbutensis Garrido	1	South America (temperate)
Callistodermatium; Singer	1981	Callistodermatium violascens Singer	1	Brazil
Caulorhiza; Lennox	1979	Caulorhiza umbonata (Peck) Lennox	3	USA
Cellypha; Donk	1959	Cellypha goldbachii (Weinm.) Donk	10	widespread
Clavomphalia; E.Horak	1987	Clavomphalia yunnanensis E.Horak	1	China
Clitocybe (Fr.) Staude	1857	Clitocybe nebularis (Batsch) P.Kumm.	300 (approx.)	widespread (esp. north temperate)
Collybia (Fr.) Staude	1857	Collybia tuberosa Fr.	3	widespread (north temperate)
Conchomyces; Overeem	1927	Conchomyces verrucisporus Overeem	2	Indonesia
Corneriella; Sánchez-García	2014	Corneriella bambusarum Desjardin & Hemmes	2	United States, Thailand
Cynema; Maas Geest. & E.Horak	1995	Cynema alutacea Maas Geest. & E.Horak	1	Papua New Guinea
Cyphellocalathus; Agerer	1981	Cyphellocalathus cecropiae (Singer) Agerer	1	widespread
Delicatula; Fayod	1889	Delicatula integrella (Pers.:Fr.) Pat.	2	widespread (temperate)
Dendrocollybia; R.H.Petersen & Redhead	2001	Dendrocollybia racemosa (Pers.) R.H.Petersen & Redhead	1	widespread (temperate)
Dennisiomyces; Singer	1955	Dennisiomyces glabrescentipes Singer	5	South America
Dermoloma (J.E.Lange) Singer ex Herink	1959	Dermoloma cuneifolium (Fr.) Singer	15 (approx.)	widespread
Fayodia; Kühner	1930	Fayodia bisphaerigera (J.E.Lange) Kühner	10 (approx.)	widespread (north temperate)
Gamundia; Raithelh.	1979	Gamundia striatula Joss. & Konrad	6	Europe, South America (temperate)
Infundibulicybe; Harmaja	2003	Infundibulicybe geotropa (Bull.) Harmaja	13	widespread
Lepista (Fr.) W.G.Sm.	1870	Lepista panaeolus (Fr.) P.Karst.	50 (approx.)	widespread
Lepistella; T.J.Baroni & Ovrebo	2007	Lepistella ocula T.J.Baroni & Ovrebo	1	Central America
Leucocortinarius (J.E.Lange) Singer	1945	Leucocortinarius bulbiger (Alb. & Schwein.) Singer	1	Europe
Leucoinocybe; Singer	1943	Leucoinocybe lenta (Maire) Singer	1	Europe
Leucopaxillus; Boursier	1925	Leucopaxillus paradoxus (Costantin & L.M.Dufour) Boursier	15 (approx.)	Europe
Lulesia; Singer	1970	Lulesia densifolia (Singer) Singer	3	tropical
Melanoleuca; Pat.	1897	Melanoleuca vulgaris (Note: Now a synonym of Melanoleuca melaleuca (Pers.) Murrill.) (Pat.) Pat.	50 (approx.)	widespread
Mycenella (J.E.Lange) Singer	1938	Mycenella cyatheae (Singer) Singer	10	widespread (temperate)
Mycoalvimia; Singer	1981	Mycoalvimia theobromicola Singer	1	Brazil
Myxomphalia; Hora	1960	Myxomphalia maura (Fr.) Hora	4	widespread (north temperate)
Neoclitocybe; Singer	1962 ("1961") (Note: Conventional mean to indicate that the taxonomic date of publication for the purpose of priority is different from the date given by the work itself.)	Neoclitocybe byssiseda (Bres.) Singer	10	widespread (esp. tropical)
Omphaliaster; Lamoure	1971	Omphaliaster borealis (M.Lange & Skifte) Lamoure	7	widespread (north temperate)
Omphalina; Quél.	1886	Omphalina pyxidata (Bull.) Quél.	50 (approx.)	widespread (esp. temperate)
Paralepista; Raithelh.	1981	Paralepista inversa (Fr.) Raithelh.	12	widespread
Paralepistopsis; Vizzini	2012	Paralepistopsis amoenolens (Malençon) Vizzini	2	North Africa, southern and southwestern Europe, Asia
Peglerochaete; Sarwal & Locq.	1983	Peglerochaete setiger Sarwal & Locq.	1	Sikkim
Pegleromyces; Singer	1981	Pegleromyces collybioides Singer	1	Brazil
Phaeomycena; R.Heim ex Singer & Digilio	1952 ("1951")	Phaeomycena aureophylla R.Heim	5	Africa, Asia
Physocystidium; Singer	1962	Physocystidium cinnamomeum (Dennis) Singer	1	Trinidad
Pleurella; E.Horak	1971	Pleurella ardesiaca (G.Stev. & G.M.Taylor) E.Horak	1	New Zealand
Porpoloma; Singer	1952	Porpoloma sejunctum Singer	12 (approx.)	South America
Pseudobaeospora; Singer	1942	Pseudobaeospora oligophylla Singer	20 (approx.)	widespread
Pseudohygrophorus; Velen.	1939	Pseudohygrophorus vesicarius Velen.	1	Europe
Pseudolaccaria; Vizzini, Contu & Z.W. Ge	1939	Pseudolaccaria pachyphylla (Fr.) Vizzini & Contu	1	Europe
Pseudolasiobolus; Agerer	1983	Pseudolasiobolus minutissimus Agerer	1	tropical
Pseudoomphalina (Singer) Singer	1956	Pseudoomphalina kalchbrenneri (Bres.) Singer	6	widespread (temperate)
Pseudotricholoma; Sánchez-García & Matheny	2014	Pseudotricholoma umbrosum (A.H.Sm. & M.B.Walters) Sánchez-García & Matheny	2	Canada, Europe, United States
Resupinatus; Nees ex Gray	1821	Resupinatus applicatus (Batsch) Gray	20 (approx.)	widespread
Rimbachia; Pat.	1891	Rimbachia paradoxa Pat.	10 (approx.)	widespread (tropical)
Ripartites; P.Karst	1879	Ripartites tricholoma (Alb. & Schwein.) P.Karst.	5 (approx.)	widespread
Stanglomyces; Raithelh.	1986 ("1985")	Stanglomyces taxophilus Raithelh.	1	South America
Tricholoma (Fr.) Staude	1857	Tricholoma equestre (L.) P.Kumm.	200 (approx.)	widespread (esp. north temperate)
Tricholosporum; Guzmán	1975	Tricholosporum goniospermum (Bres.) Guzmán	12+	Northern hemisphere, South Africa, Central America

== Notes and references ==
Notes

== See also ==
- List of Agaricales families
- List of Agaricales genera
