= Pseudohygrophorus =

Scientific classification
- Kingdom: Fungi
- Division: Basidiomycota
- Class: Agaricomycetes
- Order: Agaricales
- Family: Tricholomataceae
- Genus: Pseudohygrophorus; Velen.

Type species
- Pseudohygrophorus vesicarius Velen.

Genus of fungi

Pseudohygrophorus is a genus of fungi in the family Tricholomataceae. The genus is monotypic, and contains the single species Pseudohygrophorus vesicarius. The species was first described scientifically by the Czech botanist Josef Velenovský in 1939.

== See also ==
- List of Tricholomataceae genera
