= Mycoalvimia =

Scientific classification
- Kingdom: Fungi
- Division: Basidiomycota
- Class: Agaricomycetes
- Order: Agaricales
- Family: Tricholomataceae
- Genus: Mycoalvimia (Singer)

Type species
- Mycoalvimia theobromicola Singer

Genus of fungi

Mycoalvimia is a genus of fungus in the family Tricholomataceae. It is a monotypic genus, and contains the single species Mycoalvimia theobromicola, found in Brazil.

== See also ==
- List of Tricholomataceae genera
