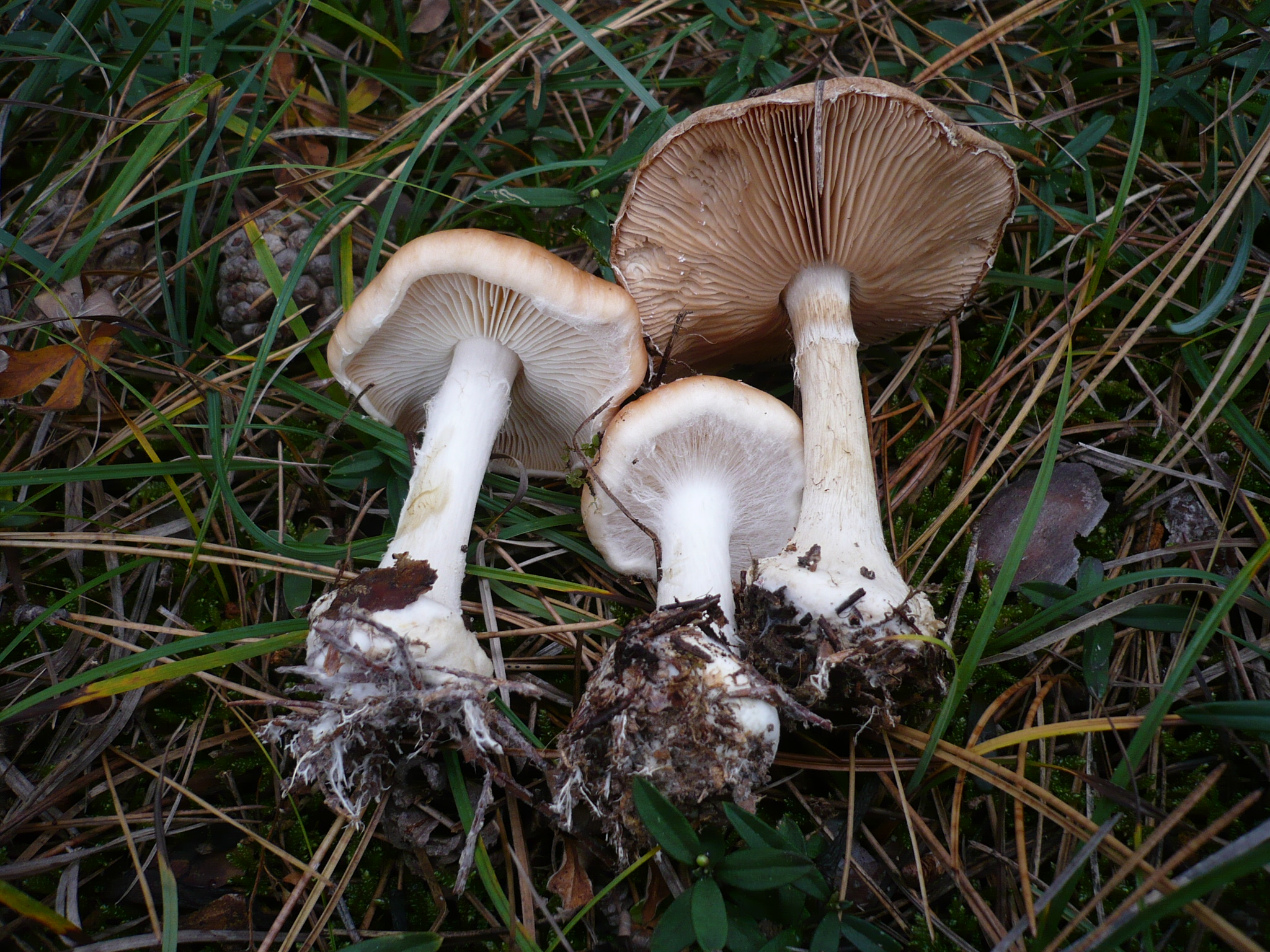

Scientific classification
- Kingdom: Fungi
- Division: Basidiomycota
- Class: Agaricomycetes
- Order: Agaricales
- Family: Tricholomataceae
- Genus: Leucocortinarius (J.E.Lange) Singer
- Species: L. bulbiger

Binomial name
- Leucocortinarius bulbiger (Alb. & Schwein.) Singer

= Leucocortinarius =

Genus of fungi

Leucocortinarius is a genus of fungus in the family Tricholomataceae. It is a monotypic genus, containing the single species Leucocortinarius bulbiger, found in Europe.

== See also ==
- List of Tricholomataceae genera
