= Lepistella =

Scientific classification
- Kingdom: Fungi
- Division: Basidiomycota
- Class: Agaricomycetes
- Order: Agaricales
- Family: Tricholomataceae
- Genus: Lepistella; T.J.Baroni & Ovrebo

Type species
- Lepistella ocula T.J.Baroni & Ovrebo

Genus of fungi

Lepistella is a genus of fungus in the family Tricholomataceae. It is a monotypic genus, containing the single species Lepistella ocula, found in Central America and reported as new to science in 2007.

== See also ==
- List of Tricholomataceae genera
