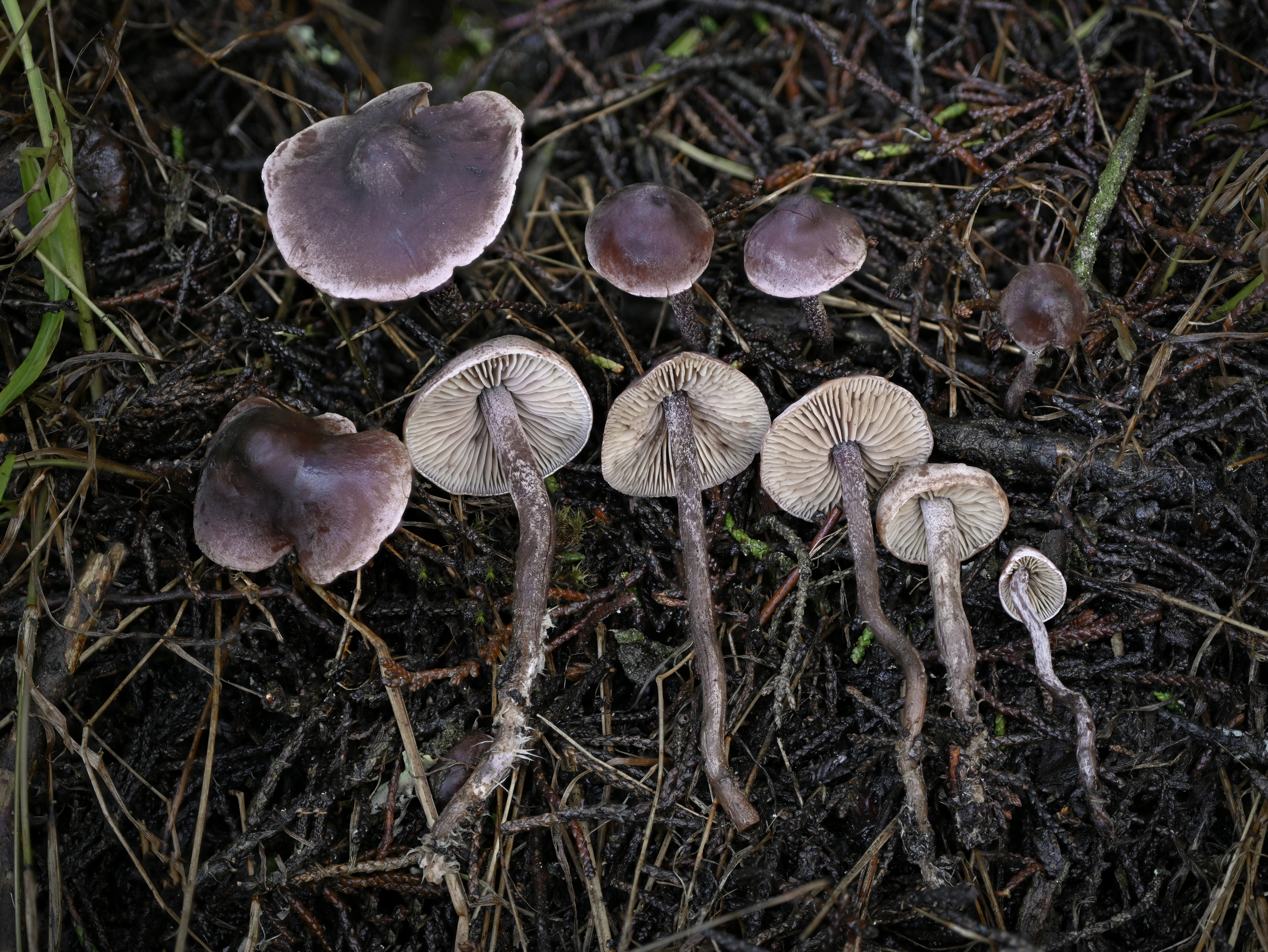
- Pseudobaeospora sp.

Scientific classification
- Kingdom: Fungi
- Division: Basidiomycota
- Class: Agaricomycetes
- Order: Agaricales
- Family: Tricholomataceae
- Genus: Pseudobaeospora; Singer (1942)

Type species
- Pseudobaeospora oligophylla (Singer) Singer (1951)

= Pseudobaeospora =

Genus of fungi

Pseudobaeospora is a genus of fungi in the family Tricholomataceae. A 2008 estimate placed about 20 species in the widespread genus.

== Species ==
- Pseudobaeospora albidula
- Pseudobaeospora aphana
- Pseudobaeospora argentea
- Pseudobaeospora basii
- Pseudobaeospora bavariae
- Pseudobaeospora calcarea
- Pseudobaeospora celluloderma
- Pseudobaeospora chilensis
- Pseudobaeospora citrina
- Pseudobaeospora cyanea
- Pseudobaeospora deckeri
- Pseudobaeospora defibulata
- Pseudobaeospora dichroa
- Pseudobaeospora ellipticospora
- Pseudobaeospora euganea
- Pseudobaeospora jamonii
- Pseudobaeospora laguncularis
- Pseudobaeospora lamingtonensis
- Pseudobaeospora lavendulamellata
- Pseudobaeospora mutabilis
- Pseudobaeospora pallidifolia
- Pseudobaeospora paulochroma
- Pseudobaeospora stevensii
- Pseudobaeospora subglobispora
- Pseudobaeospora syringea
- Pseudobaeospora wipapatiae

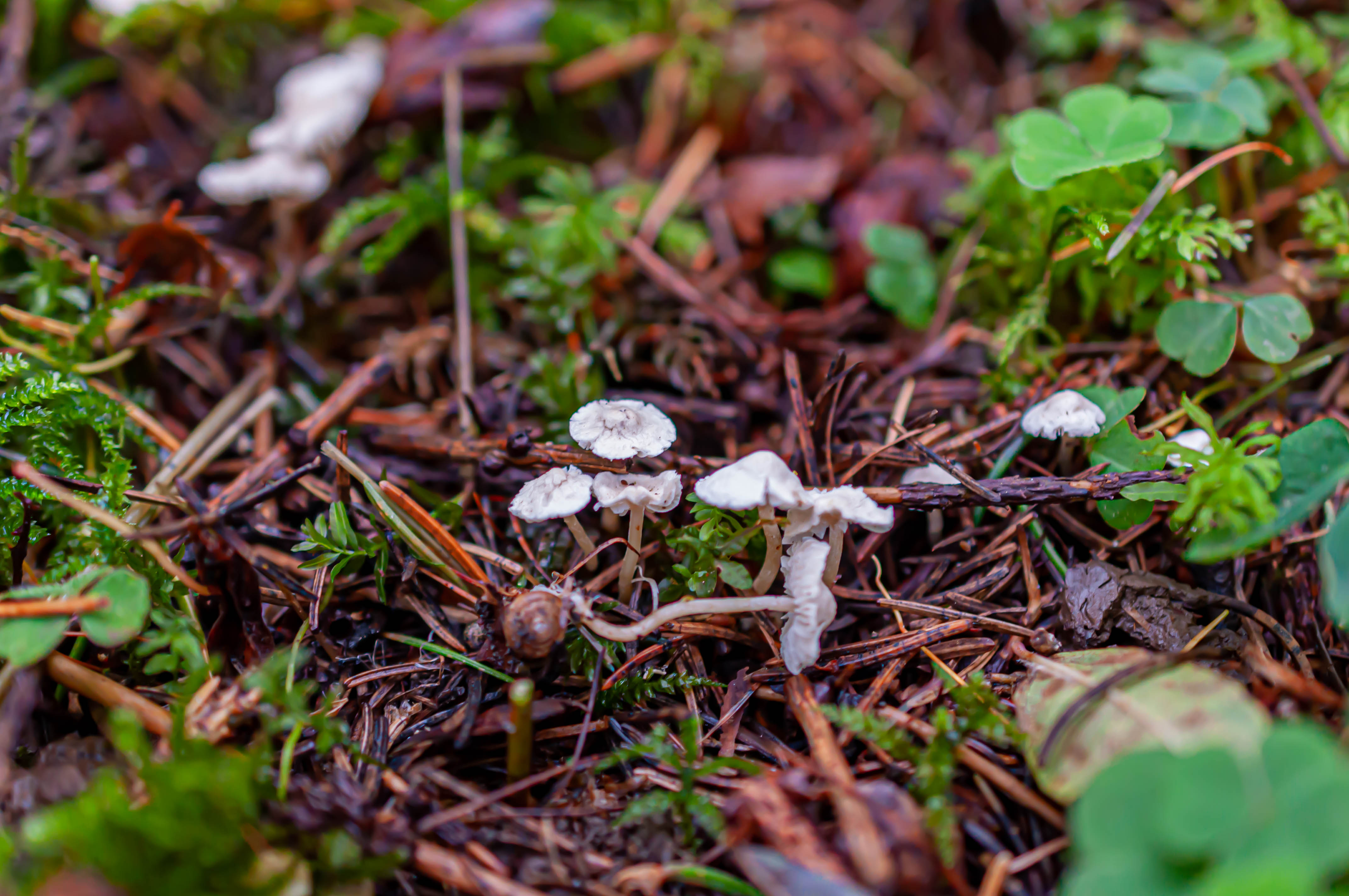
Pseudobaeospora calcarea

== See also ==
- List of Agaricales genera
- List of Tricholomataceae genera
