= Cynema =

Scientific classification
- Kingdom: Fungi
- Division: Basidiomycota
- Class: Agaricomycetes
- Order: Agaricales
- Family: Tricholomataceae
- Genus: Cynema; Maas Geest. & E.Horak

Type species
- Cynema alutacea Maas Geest. & E.Horak

Genus of fungi

Cynema is a genus of fungi in the family Tricholomataceae. This is a monotypic genus, containing the single species Cynema alutacea, found in Papua New Guinea.

== See also ==
- List of Tricholomataceae genera
