= Pseudolasiobolus =

Scientific classification
- Kingdom: Fungi
- Division: Basidiomycota
- Class: Agaricomycetes
- Order: Agaricales
- Family: Tricholomataceae
- Genus: Pseudolasiobolus; Agerer

Type species
- Pseudolasiobolus minutissimus Agerer

Genus of fungi

Pseudolasiobolus is a genus of fungus in the family Tricholomataceae. A monotypic genus, it contains the single species Pseudolasiobolus minutissimus, described by German mycologist Reinhard Agerer in 1983.

== See also ==
- List of Tricholomataceae genera
