= Cyphellocalathus =

Scientific classification
- Kingdom: Fungi
- Division: Basidiomycota
- Class: Agaricomycetes
- Order: Agaricales
- Family: Tricholomataceae
- Genus: Cyphellocalathus; Agerer

Type species
- Cyphellocalathus cecropiae (Singer) Agerer

Genus of fungi

Cyphellocalathus is a genus of fungi in the family Tricholomataceae. This is a monotypic genus, containing the single species Cyphellocalathus cecropiae, found in Bolivia.

== See also ==
- List of Tricholomataceae genera
