= Stanglomyces =

Scientific classification
- Kingdom: Fungi
- Division: Basidiomycota
- Class: Agaricomycetes
- Order: Agaricales
- Family: Tricholomataceae
- Genus: Stanglomyces; Raithelh.

Type species
- Stanglomyces taxophilus Raithelh.

Genus of fungi

Stanglomyces is a genus of fungi in the family Tricholomataceae. This is a monotypic genus, containing the single species Stanglomyces taxophilus, found in South America. The species was described as new to science by Jörg Raithelhuber in 1985.

The genus name of Stanglomyces is in honour of Johann Stangl (1923–1988), who was a German botanist and Mycologist .

== See also ==
- List of Tricholomataceae genera
