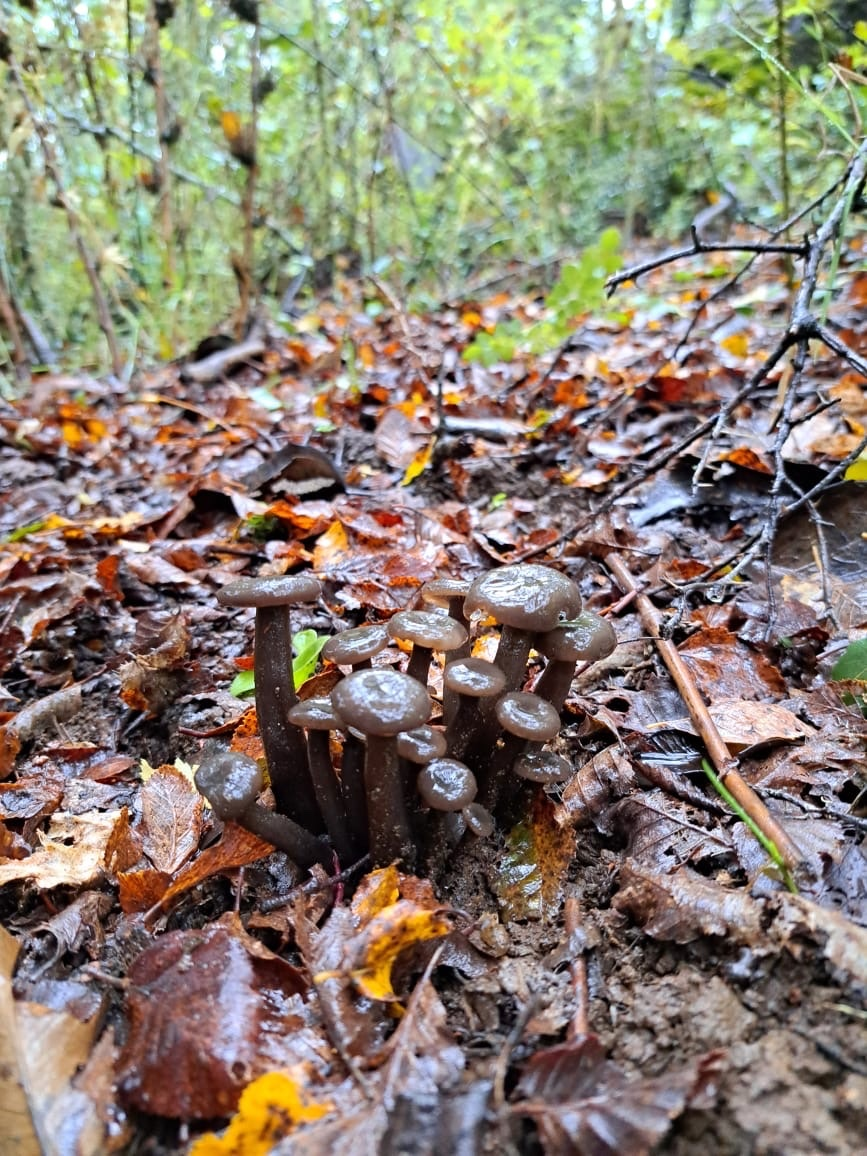

Scientific classification
- Kingdom: Fungi
- Division: Basidiomycota
- Class: Agaricomycetes
- Order: Agaricales
- Family: Tricholomataceae
- Genus: Austroomphaliaster; Garrido (1998)

Type species
- Austroomphaliaster nahuelbutensis Garrido (1998)

= Austroomphaliaster =

Monotypic genus of fungi

Austroomphaliaster is a fungal genus in the family Tricholomataceae. It is a monotypic genus, containing the single species Austroomphaliaster nahuelbutensis, also known as the big puma fungus, the species is found in temperate South America. This species lives on Patagonian oak trees, Dombey’s beech trees, and caves. In May 2023, specimens of the formerly lost fungus were found in caves of the Nahuelbuta Mountains in Chile in an expedition by Fungi Foundation and Fundación Nahuelbuta under Re: Wild's search for lost species initiative. Prior to its rediscovery in 2023, the species was only documented in the wild once during the 1980s.

== See also ==
- Lazarus taxon
- List of Agaricales genera
- List of Tricholomataceae genera
