= Clavomphalia =

Scientific classification
- Kingdom: Fungi
- Division: Basidiomycota
- Class: Agaricomycetes
- Order: Agaricales
- Family: Tricholomataceae
- Genus: Clavomphalia; E.Horak

Type species
- Clavomphalia yunnanensis E.Horak

Genus of fungi

Clavomphalia is a genus of fungi in the family Tricholomataceae. It is a monotypic genus, containing only Clavomphalia yunnanensis, a Chinese species first described by German mycologist Egon Horak in 1987.

== See also ==
- List of Tricholomataceae genera
