= Omphaliaster borealis =

Scientific classification
- Kingdom: Fungi
- Division: Basidiomycota
- Class: Agaricomycetes
- Order: Agaricales
- Family: Tricholomataceae
- Genus: Omphaliaster
- Species: O. borealis

Binomial name
- Omphaliaster borealis (M.Lange & Skifte) Lamoure

Synonyms
- 1967 Rhodocybe borealis M.Lange & Skifte; 1969 Clitocybe borealis (M.Lange & Skifte) P.D.Orton & Watling

Species of fungus

Omphaliaster borealis is a species of fungus in the family Tricholomataceae, and the type species of the genus Omphaliaster. First described in 1967 as Rhodocybe borealis, it was transferred to Omphaliaster in 1971.

== See also ==
- List of Tricholomataceae genera
