= Physocystidium =

Scientific classification
- Kingdom: Fungi
- Division: Basidiomycota
- Class: Agaricomycetes
- Order: Agaricales
- Family: Tricholomataceae
- Genus: Physocystidium; Singer

Type species
- Physocystidium cinnamomeum (Dennis) Singer

Genus of fungi

Physocystidium is a genus of fungi in the family Tricholomataceae. This is a monotypic genus, containing the single species Physocystidium cinnamomeum. This species is found in Trinidad, and was originally described as new to science in 1951 as Collybia cinnamomea by mycologist R.W.G. Dennis; Rolf Singer transferred it to the then newly created genus Physocystidium in 1962.

== See also ==
- List of Tricholomataceae genera
