= Austroclitocybe =

Scientific classification
- Kingdom: Fungi
- Division: Basidiomycota
- Class: Agaricomycetes
- Order: Agaricales
- Family: Tricholomataceae
- Genus: Austroclitocybe; Raithelh.

Type species
- Austroclitocybe veronicae Raithelh.

Genus of fungi

Austroclitocybe is a genus of fungi in the family Tricholomataceae. The genus is monotypic, containing the single species Austroclitocybe veronicae, found in temperate South America. The genus was circumscribed by Jörg H. Raithelhuber in 1972.

== See also ==
- List of Tricholomataceae genera
