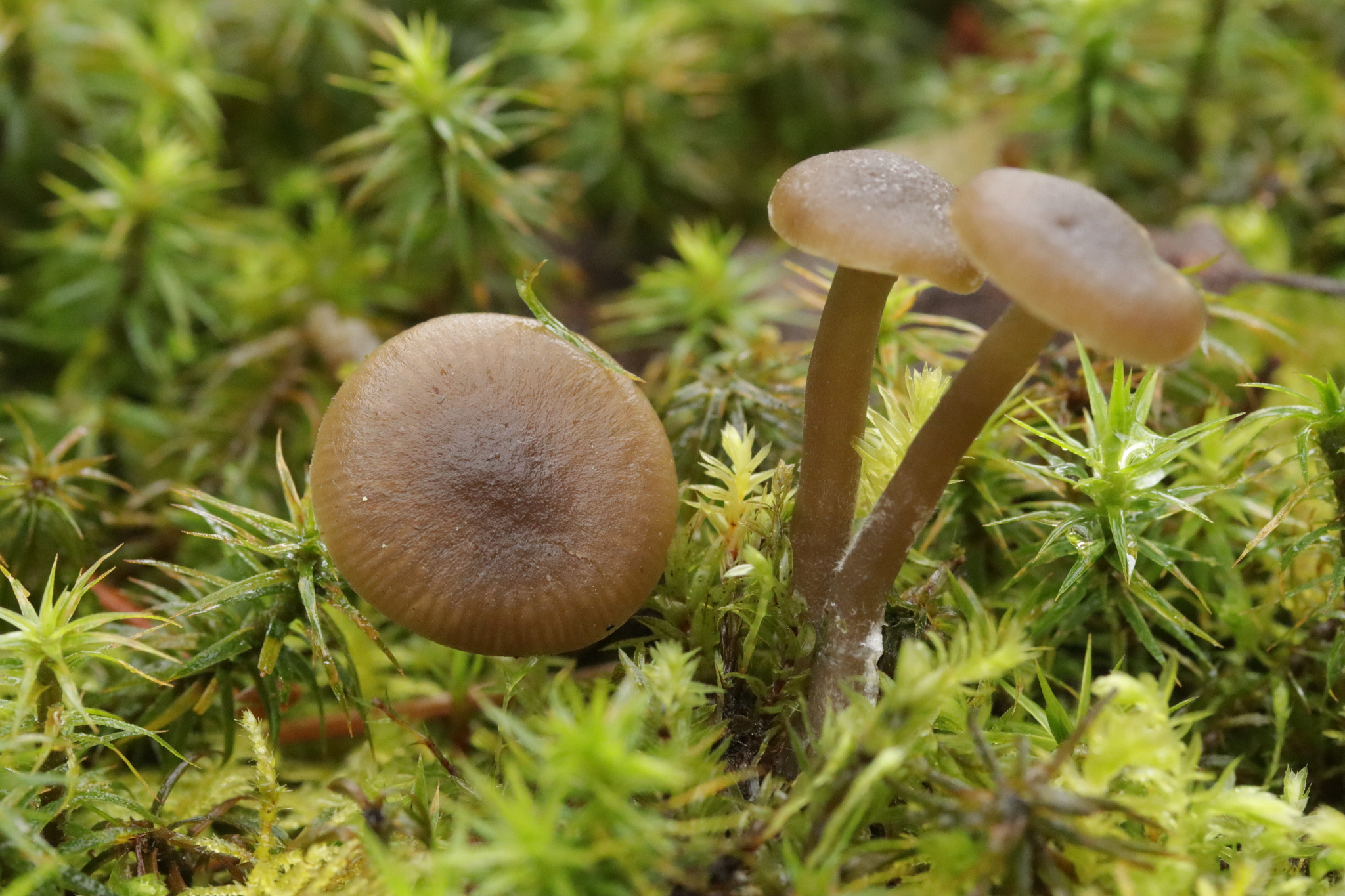
- Omphaliaster asterosporus

Scientific classification
- Kingdom: Fungi
- Division: Basidiomycota
- Class: Agaricomycetes
- Order: Agaricales
- Family: Tricholomataceae
- Genus: Omphaliaster; Lamoure

Type species
- Omphaliaster borealis (M.Lange & Skifte) Lamoure

Species
- O. asterosporus O. borealis O. ianthinocystis O. kyrtosporus O. nauseodulcis O. obolus O. palustris

= Omphaliaster =

Genus of fungi

Omphaliaster is a genus of fungi in the family Tricholomataceae. The widespread genus contains seven species, predominantly in northern temperate regions.

== See also ==
- List of Tricholomataceae genera
