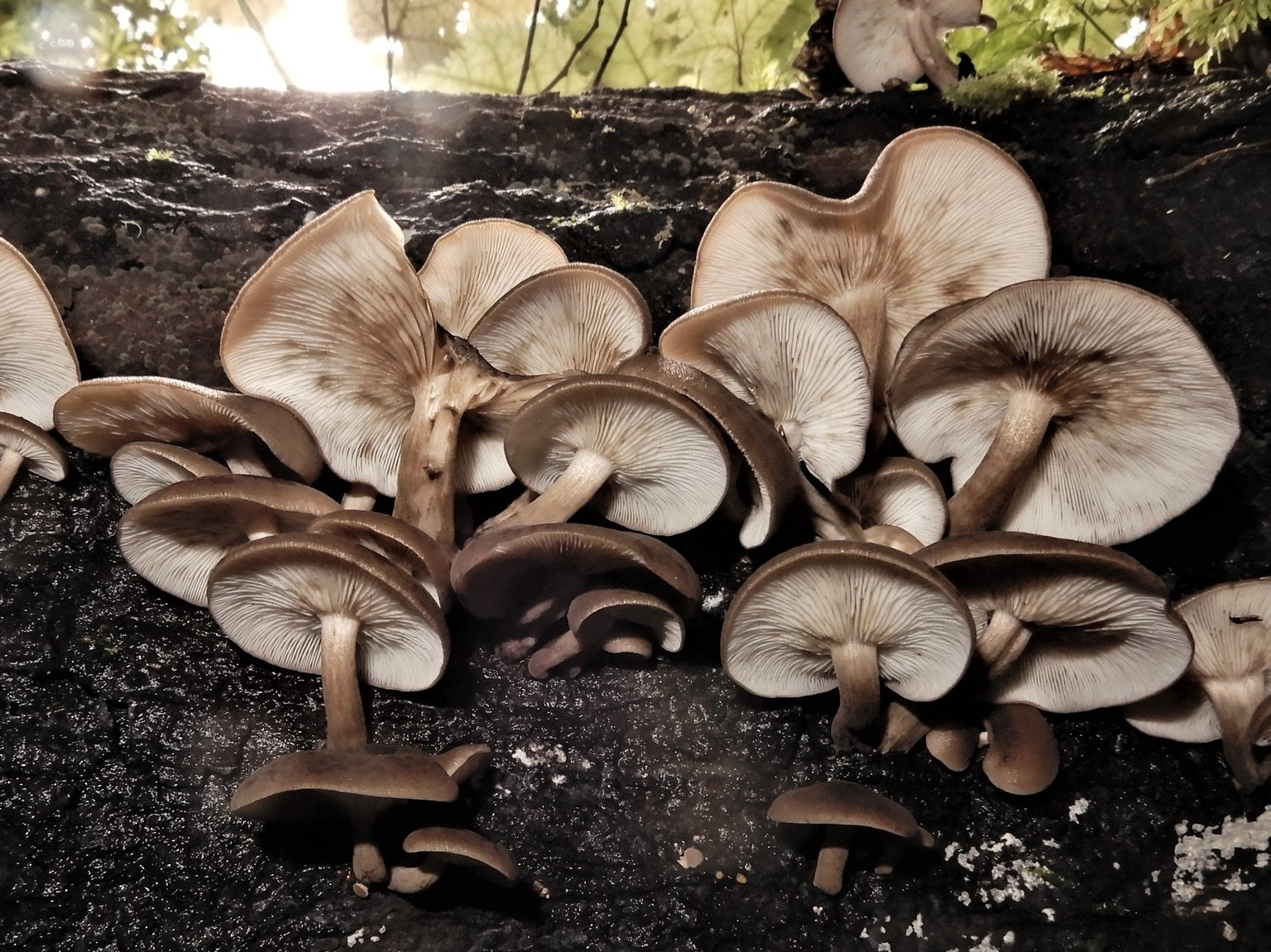

Scientific classification
- Domain: Eukaryota
- Kingdom: Fungi
- Division: Basidiomycota
- Class: Agaricomycetes
- Order: Agaricales
- Family: Tricholomataceae
- Genus: Pleurella; E.Horak
- Species: P. ardesiaca

Binomial name
- Pleurella ardesiaca (G.Stev. & G.M.Taylor) E.Horak

= Pleurella =

Pleurella ardesiaca

Genus of fungi

Pleurella is a genus of fungi in the family Tricholomataceae. This is a monotypic genus, containing the single species Pleurella ardesiaca, found in New Zealand.

== See also ==
- List of Tricholomataceae genera
