= Callistodermatium =

Scientific classification
- Kingdom: Fungi
- Division: Basidiomycota
- Class: Agaricomycetes
- Order: Agaricales
- Family: Tricholomataceae
- Genus: Callistodermatium (Singer) (1981)

Type species
- Callistodermatium violascens Singer (1981)

Genus of fungi

Callistodermatium is a fungal genus in the family Tricholomataceae. It is a monotypic genus, and contains the single species Callistodermatium violascens. The holotype was found in Brazil, and described by mycologist Rolf Singer in 1981.

== See also ==
- List of Tricholomataceae genera
