= Corneriella =

Scientific classification
- Kingdom: Fungi
- Division: Basidiomycota
- Class: Agaricomycetes
- Order: Agaricales
- Family: Tricholomataceae
- Genus: Corneriella; Sánchez-García (2014)

Type species
- Corneriella bambusarum (Desjardin & Hemmes) Sánchez-García (2014)

Genus of fungi

Corneriella is a genus of fungi in the family Tricholomataceae. The genus contains two species known from the United States and Thailand, and at least four others have been detected by DNA sequencing. Corneriella was described the mycologist Marisol Sánchez-García in 2014 with Corneriella bambusarum as the type species.

== Description ==
Corneriella has a tricholomatoid stature and gills that are occasionally forked and have sinuate, adnexed or decurrent attachment. When young, the gills are white, however they darken with age. The spores are smooth, thin-walled and amyloid. Cheilocystidia are conspicuous and have thin walls and various forms. Pleurocystidia are absent. The pileipellis is a cutis and clamp connections are present. Species in Corneriella are probably saprotrophs.

Macroscopically, it resembles Tricholoma.

Phylogenetically, it is closely related to Dennisiomyces and Albomagister.

== Etymology ==
Corneriella was named after British botanist and mycologist Edred John Henry Corner, who described Cantharellula humicola which is now in Corneriella.

== Species ==
- Corneriella bambusarum
- Corneriella humicola
- Corneriella indica

== See also ==
- List of Tricholomataceae genera
