= Phaeomycena =

Scientific classification
- Kingdom: Fungi
- Division: Basidiomycota
- Class: Agaricomycetes
- Order: Agaricales
- Family: Tricholomataceae
- Genus: Phaeomycena; R.Heim ex Singer & Digilio

Type species
- Phaeomycena aureophylla R.Heim

Species
- P. albidula P. aureophylla P. fusca P. indica P. macrospora

Genus of fungi

Phaeomycena is a genus of fungi in the family Tricholomataceae. The genus contains five species found in Asia and Africa.

== See also ==
- List of Tricholomataceae genera
