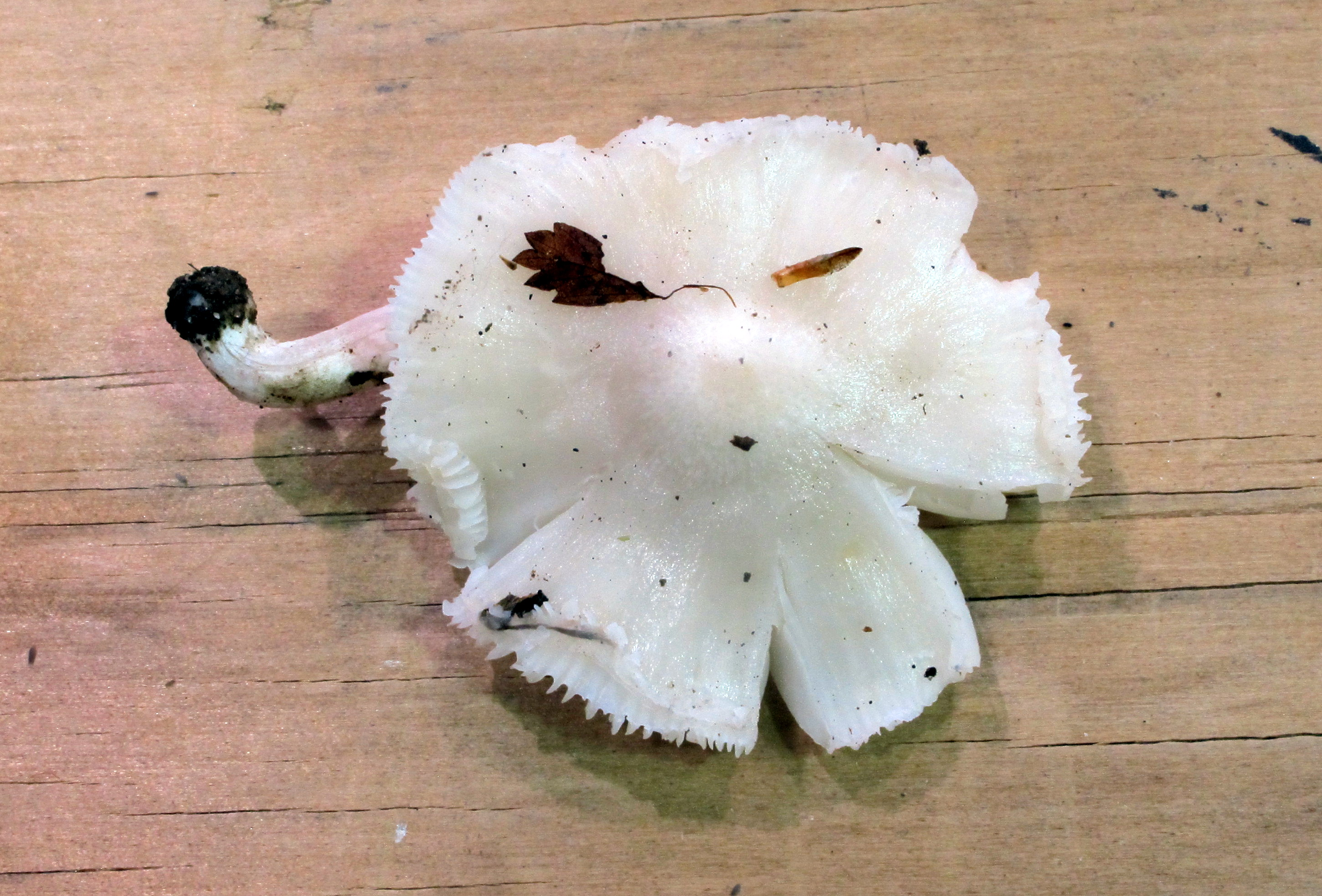

Scientific classification
- Domain: Eukaryota
- Kingdom: Fungi
- Division: Basidiomycota
- Class: Agaricomycetes
- Order: Agaricales
- Family: Tricholomataceae
- Genus: Albomagister; Sánchez-García, Birkebak & Matheny (2014)

Type species
- Albomagister subaustralis (A.H.Sm. & Hesler) Sánchez-García, Birkebak & Matheny (2014)

= Albomagister =

Genus of fungi

Albomagister subaustralis Mycological characteristics
- Gills on hymenium
- Cap is umbonate or conical
- Hymenium is adnexed
- Stipe is bare
- Spore print is white
- Edibility is unknown

Albomagister is a genus of fungi in the family Tricholomataceae. The genus contains just one named species known from Tennessee and North Carolina, however two other undescribed species have been sequenced. Albomagister was described by mycologists Marisol Sánchez-García, Joshua Birkebak & P. Brandon Matheny in 2014 with Albomagister subaustralis as the type species.

Albomagister has a tricholomatoid stature and white gills with adnexed attachment. The spores are smooth, thin-walled and inamyloid. It is unique in the Tricholomataceae due to the presence of long and conspicuous cheilocystidia and pleurocystidia, which arise from below the hymenium and are clear and thin-walled. The lamellar trama is parallel and clamp connections are present. Macroscopically, it resembles Tricholoma and Leucopaxillus, however the presence of prominent lamellar cystidia separate it from Tricholoma and the smooth inamyloid spores distinguish it from Leucopaxillus.

Phylogenetically, it is closely related to Corneriella.

== Etymology ==
In Latin, magister means mister and the albo is derived from the Latin word for white, albus. The name literally means "Mr. white".

== See also ==
- List of Tricholomataceae genera
