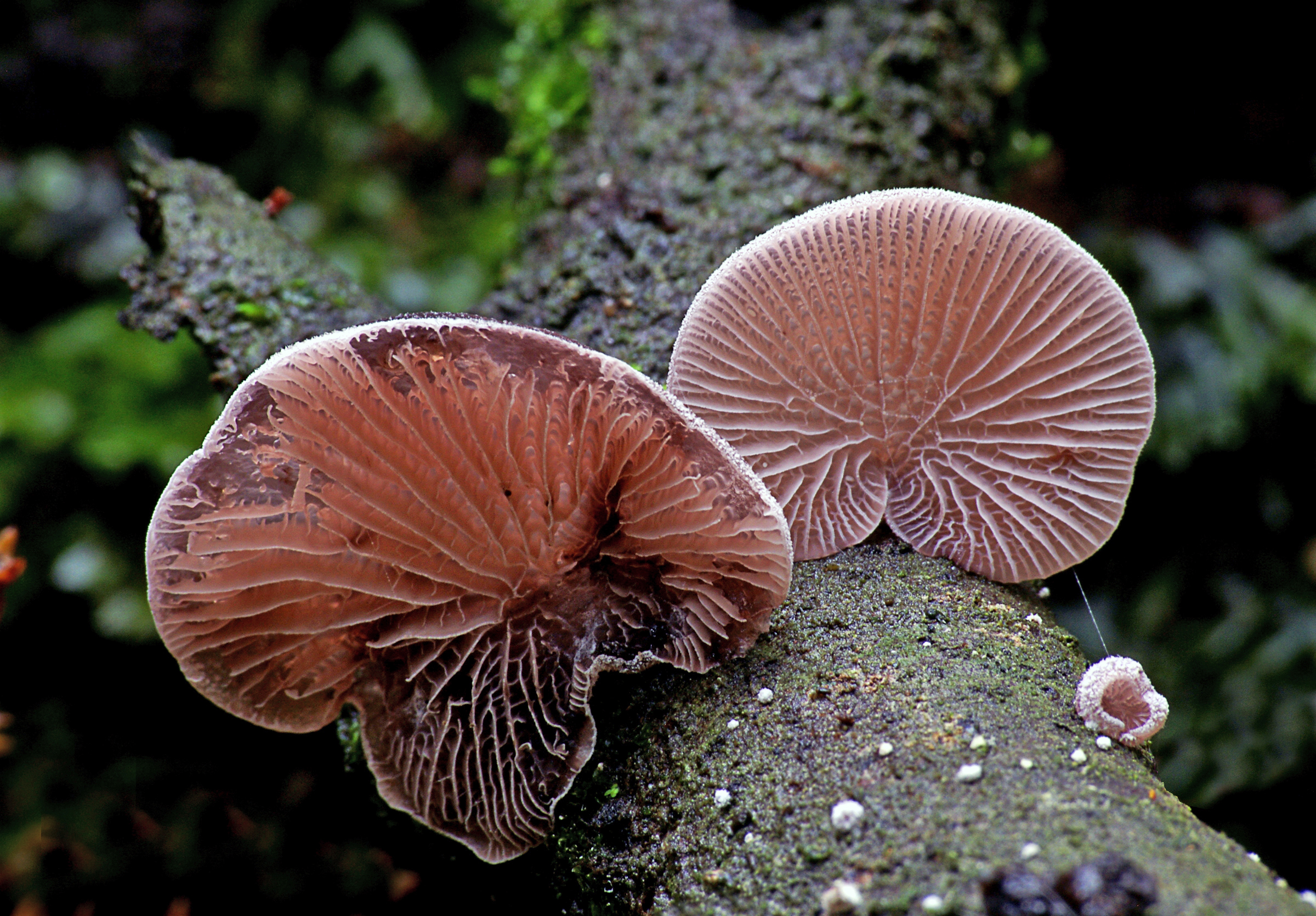
- Conchomyces bursaeformis

Scientific classification
- Kingdom: Fungi
- Division: Basidiomycota
- Class: Agaricomycetes
- Order: Agaricales
- Family: Tricholomataceae
- Genus: Conchomyces; Overeem

Type species
- Conchomyces verrucisporus Overeem

Species
- C. bursiformis C. verrucisporus

= Conchomyces =

Genus of fungi

Conchomyces is a genus of fungi in the order Agaricales. The genus was named and described scientifically by Casper van Overeem in 1927. The genus contains two species found in Indonesia.
