= Pogonoloma =

Scientific classification
- Kingdom: Fungi
- Division: Basidiomycota
- Class: Agaricomycetes
- Order: Agaricales
- Family: Pseudoclitocybaceae
- Genus: Pogonoloma (Singer) Sánchez-García (2014)

Type species
- Pogonoloma spinulosum (Kühner & Romagn.) Sánchez-García (2014)

Synonyms
- Porpoloma subg. Pogonoloma Singer (1962)

Genus of fungi

Pogonoloma is a mushroom genus in the family Tricholomataceae in a broad sense. The genus contains two species known from Europe. Pogonoloma was described first as a subgenus of the genus Porpoloma but recent molecular evidence separates the two by several other genera, with Porpoloma remaining within a smaller family Tricholomataceae, and Pogonoloma included in the family Pseudoclitocybaceae.

Pogonoloma has a tricholomatoid stature (i.e. has a notched gill attachment, a thick fleshy stipe and lacks an annulus or volva), a pileus with a margin covered in soft hairs (pilose), gills that are adnate to emarginate (notched), and white to cream colored. Its basidiospores are amyloid, smooth, ellipsoid, and have thin walls. It lacks cheilocystidia or they are poorly formed and it lacks pleurocystidia. The cap cuticle is a cutis of cylindrical hyphae with intracellular pigments. Clamp connections are present. The two species occur on soil.

== Etymology ==
The name Pogonoloma is derived from the Ancient Greek words pogon meaning beard and loma meaning fringe or border in reference to the pilose margin of the type.

== Species ==
- Pogonoloma spinulosum
- Pogonoloma macrocephalum

== See also ==
- List of Agaricales genera
