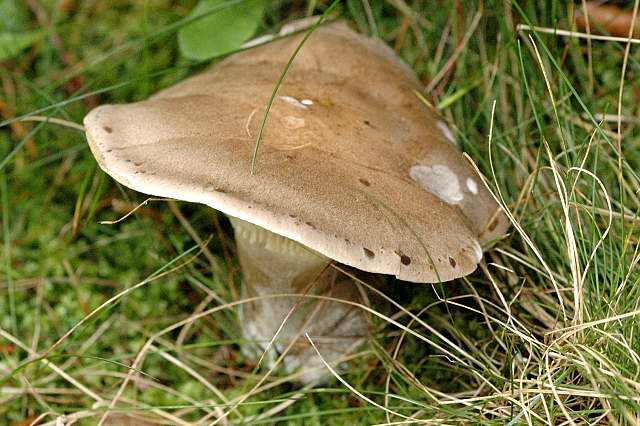

Scientific classification
- Domain: Eukaryota
- Kingdom: Fungi
- Division: Basidiomycota
- Class: Agaricomycetes
- Order: Agaricales
- Family: Tricholomataceae
- Genus: Lepista
- Species: L. panaeolus

Binomial name
- Lepista panaeolus (Fr.) P.Karst.

= Lepista panaeolus =

Species of fungus

Lepista panaeolus is a species of fungus belonging to the family Tricholomataceae.

It has cosmopolitan distribution.
