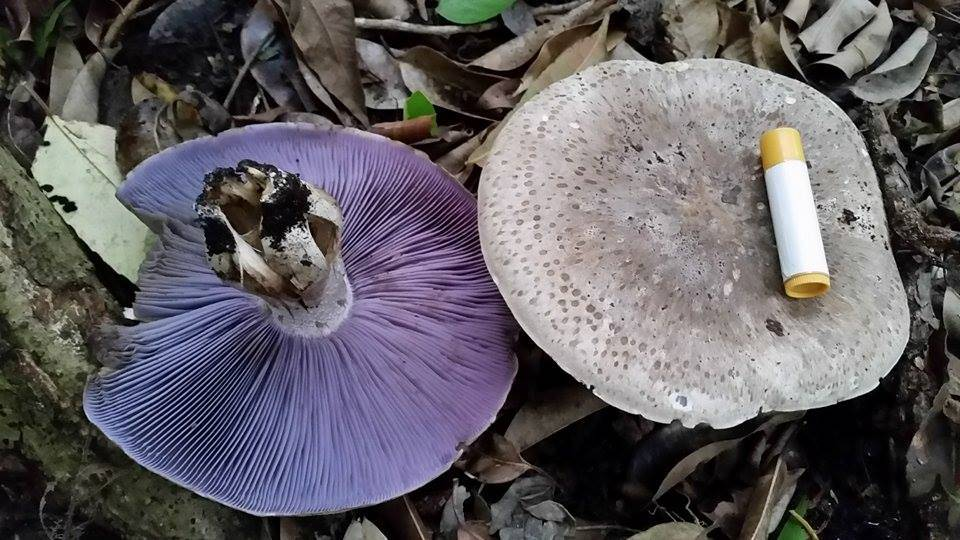
- Aspronocybe sp. from Sulawesi, Indonesia

Scientific classification
- Kingdom: Fungi
- Division: Basidiomycota
- Class: Agaricomycetes
- Order: Agaricales
- Family: Tricholomataceae
- Genus: Asproinocybe; R. Heim

Type species
- Asproinocybe lactifera R. Heim

Species
- A. brunneolilacina A. lactifera A. nodulospora A. russuloides A. superba

= Asproinocybe =

Genus of fungi

Asproinocybe is a genus of fungi in the family Tricholomataceae. The genus contains five species found in tropical Africa.

== See also ==
- List of Tricholomataceae genera
