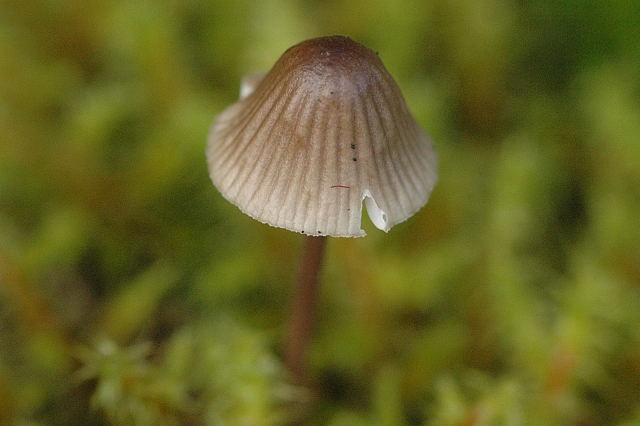
- Mycenella bryophila

Scientific classification
- Kingdom: Fungi
- Division: Basidiomycota
- Class: Agaricomycetes
- Order: Agaricales
- Family: Tricholomataceae
- Genus: Mycenella (J.E.Lange) Singer (1938)

Type species
- Mycenella cyatheae Singer (Singer) (1938)

Species
- M. bryophila M. margaritispora M. minima M. polylepidis M. radicata M. receptibilis M. rubropunctata M. salicina M. trachyspora M. variispora

= Mycenella =

Genus of fungi

Mycenella is a genus of fungi in the family Tricholomataceae. The widespread genus contains 10 species, found mostly in temperate regions. Mycologist Rolf Singer circumscribed the genus in 1938.
