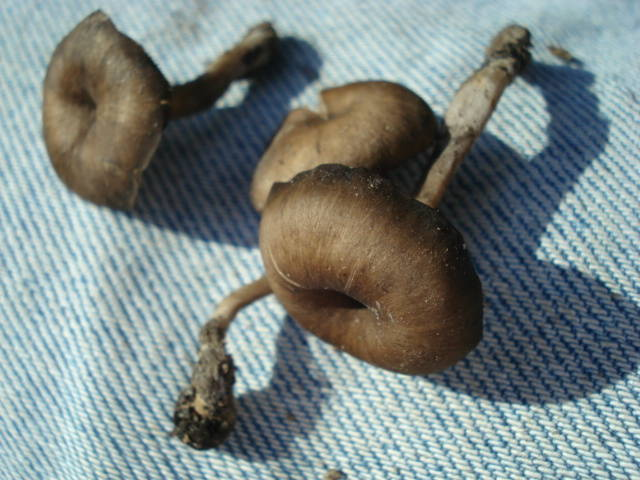
- Myxomphalia maura

Scientific classification
- Kingdom: Fungi
- Division: Basidiomycota
- Class: Agaricomycetes
- Order: Agaricales
- Family: Tricholomataceae
- Genus: Myxomphalia; Hora

Type species
- Myxomphalia maura (Fr.) Hora

Species
- M. agloea M. invita M. marthae M. maura

= Myxomphalia =

Genus of fungi

Myxomphalia is a genus of fungi in the family Tricholomataceae. The genus has a widespread distribution in north temperate areas, and contains four species.
