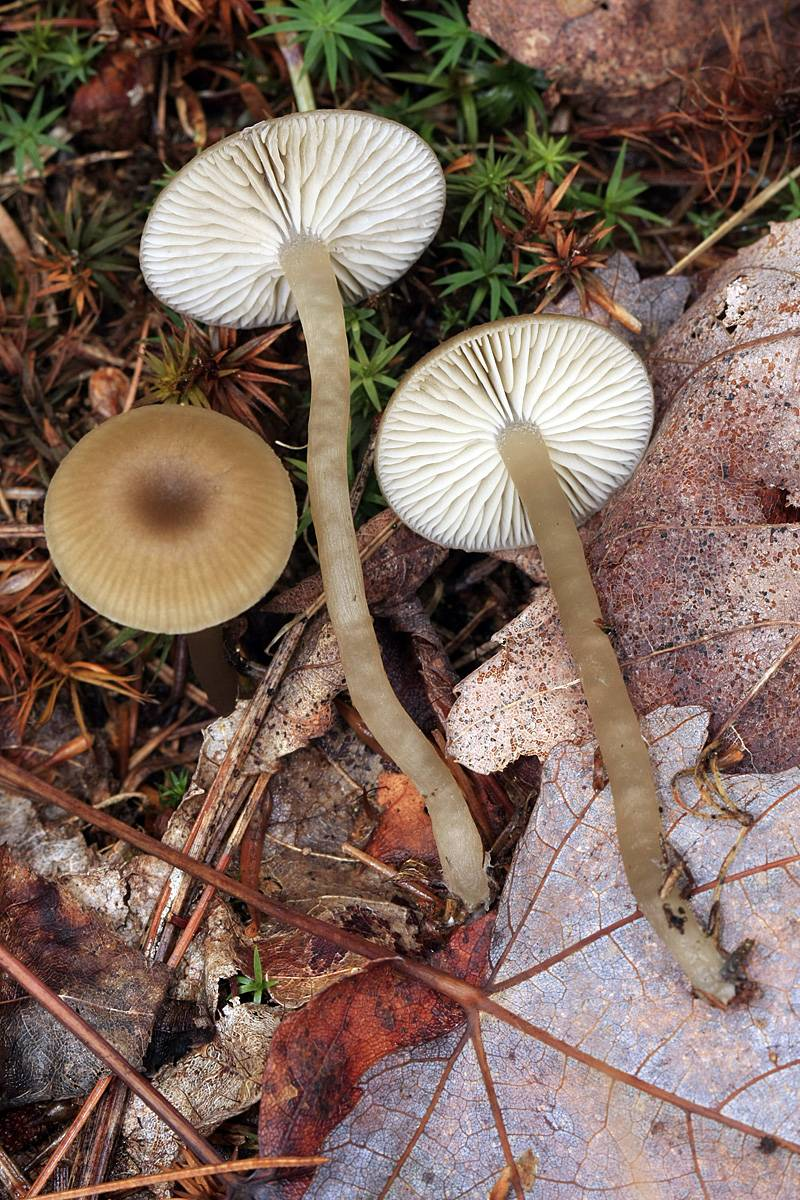
- Gamundia striatula

Scientific classification
- Kingdom: Fungi
- Division: Basidiomycota
- Class: Agaricomycetes
- Order: Agaricales
- Family: Tricholomataceae
- Genus: Gamundia; Raithelh. (1979)

Type species
- Collybia pseudoclusilis Joss. & Konrad (1980)

Species
- G. hygrocyboides G. leucophylla G. lonatii G. metuloidigera G. striatula G. xerophila

= Gamundia =

Genus of fungi

Gamundia is a genus of fungi in the family Tricholomataceae. The genus contains six species found in Europe and temperate regions of South America.

The genus name of Gamundia is in honour of Irma Josefa Gamundí (nee Amos) (b.1927), an Argentinian botanist, Professor of Botany at the Universidad Nacional del Comahue.

The genus was circumscribed by Jörg Raithelhuber in Metrodiana Vol.8 (2.3) on page 34 in 1979.
