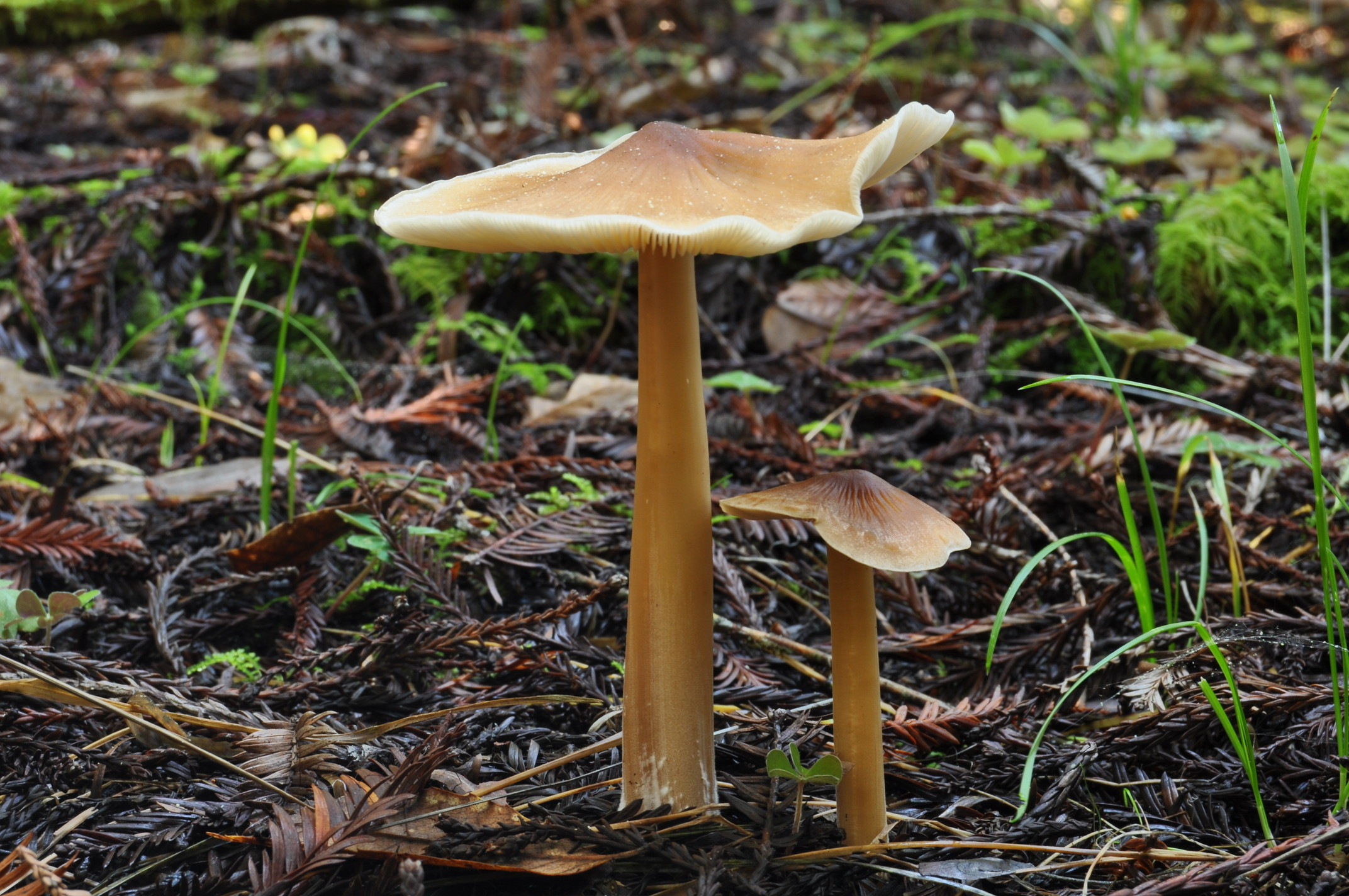
- Caulorhiza umbonata

Scientific classification
- Kingdom: Fungi
- Division: Basidiomycota
- Class: Agaricomycetes
- Order: Agaricales
- Family: Tricholomataceae
- Genus: Caulorhiza; Lennox

Type species
- Caulorhiza umbonata (Peck) Lennox

Species
- C. hygrophoroides C. trullisatipes C. umbonata

= Caulorhiza =

Genus of fungi

Caulorhiza is a genus of fungi in the family Tricholomataceae. The genus, which contains three species found in the US, was circumscribed by Joanne Lennox in 1979.
