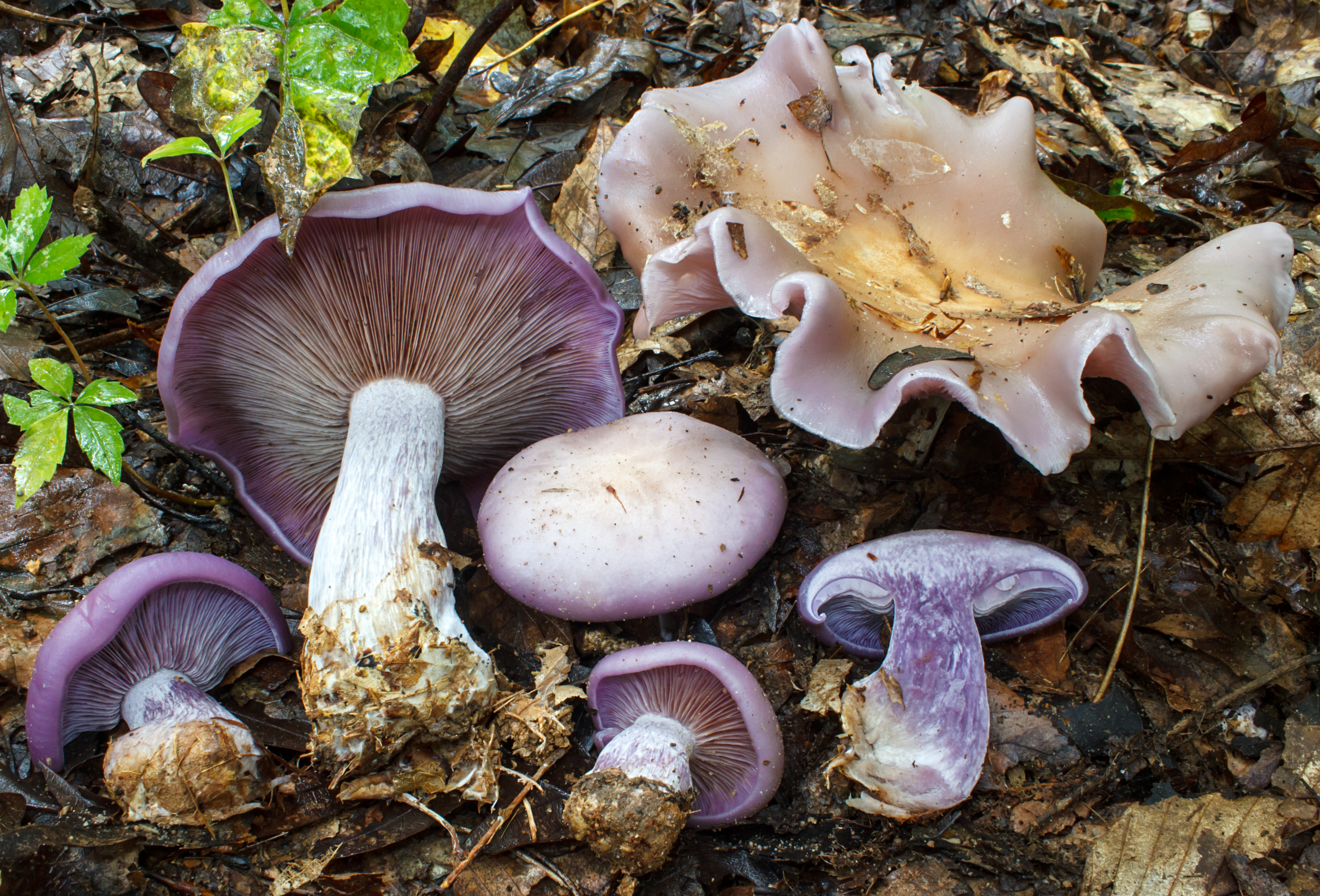
- Wood blewit

Scientific classification
- Kingdom: Fungi
- Division: Basidiomycota
- Class: Agaricomycetes
- Order: Agaricales
- Family: Clitocybaceae
- Genus: Collybia
- Species: C. nuda

Binomial name
- Collybia nuda (Bull.) Z.M. He & Zhu L. Yang (2023)

Synonyms
- Agaricus nudus Bull. (1790); Cortinarius nudus (Bull.) Gray (1821); Gyrophila nuda (Fr.) Quél. (1886); Lepista nuda (Bull.) Cooke (1871); Tricholoma nudum (Bull.) P.Kumm. (1871); Rhodopaxillus nudus (Bull.) Maire (1913) Tricholoma personatum var. nudum (Bull.) Rick (1961)

= Collybia nuda =

Species of mushroom

Collybia nuda
- Mycological characteristics
- Gills on hymenium
- Cap is convex or umbonate
- Hymenium is emarginate
- Stipe is bare
- Spore print is buff
- Ecology is saprotrophic
- Edibility is choice

Collybia nuda, commonly known as the blewit, wood blewit or blue foot and previously described as Lepista nuda and Clitocybe nuda, is a species of fungi. Described by Pierre Bulliard in 1790, it was also known as Tricholoma nudum for many years. It is morphologically similar and related to the field blewit, Collybia personata; both mushrooms were reassigned to the genus Collybia in 2023.

The species is native to Europe and North America. It is found in both coniferous and deciduous woodlands. It has been cultivated in Britain, the Netherlands and France. It is a widely consumed edible mushroom.

== Taxonomy ==
The French mycologist Pierre Bulliard described the wood blewit in his work Herbier de la France in 1790 as Agaricus nudus, reporting that it was common in the woods all year. He wrote of two varieties: one whose gills and cap are initially light violet and mature to burgundy, while the other has wine-coloured gills that intensify in colour with age. He added that the first variety was often confused with Cortinarius violaceus, though it has a "nude" cap and no spidery web veil unlike the other species. English naturalist James Bolton gave it the name Agaricus bulbosa—the bulbous agaric—in his An History of Fungusses growing about Halifax in 1791. He noted that it was rare in the region, though had found some in Ovenden.

German mycologist Paul Kummer placed it in the genus Tricholoma in 1871, the same year that English botanist Mordecai Cubitt Cooke placed it in Lepista. It was known by these names for many years, with some authors accepting Lepista and while others retained the wood blewit in Tricholoma. In 1969 Howard E. Bigelow and Alexander H. Smith reviewed Lepista and reclassified it as a subgenus of Clitocybe Finnish mycologist Harri Harmaja has called for the sinking of Lepista into Clitocybe, with C. nebularis as the type species of the latter genus. Hence the wood blewit is classified as either Lepista nuda or Clitocybe nuda.

A 2015 genetic study found that the genera Collybia and Lepista were closely related to the core clade of Clitocybe, but that all three were polyphyletic, with many members in lineages removed from other members of the same genus and instead more closely related to the other two. To complicate matters, the wood blewit is not closely related to the type species of Lepista, L. densifolia. Alvarado and colleagues declined to define the genera but proposed several options and highlighted the need for a wider analysis.

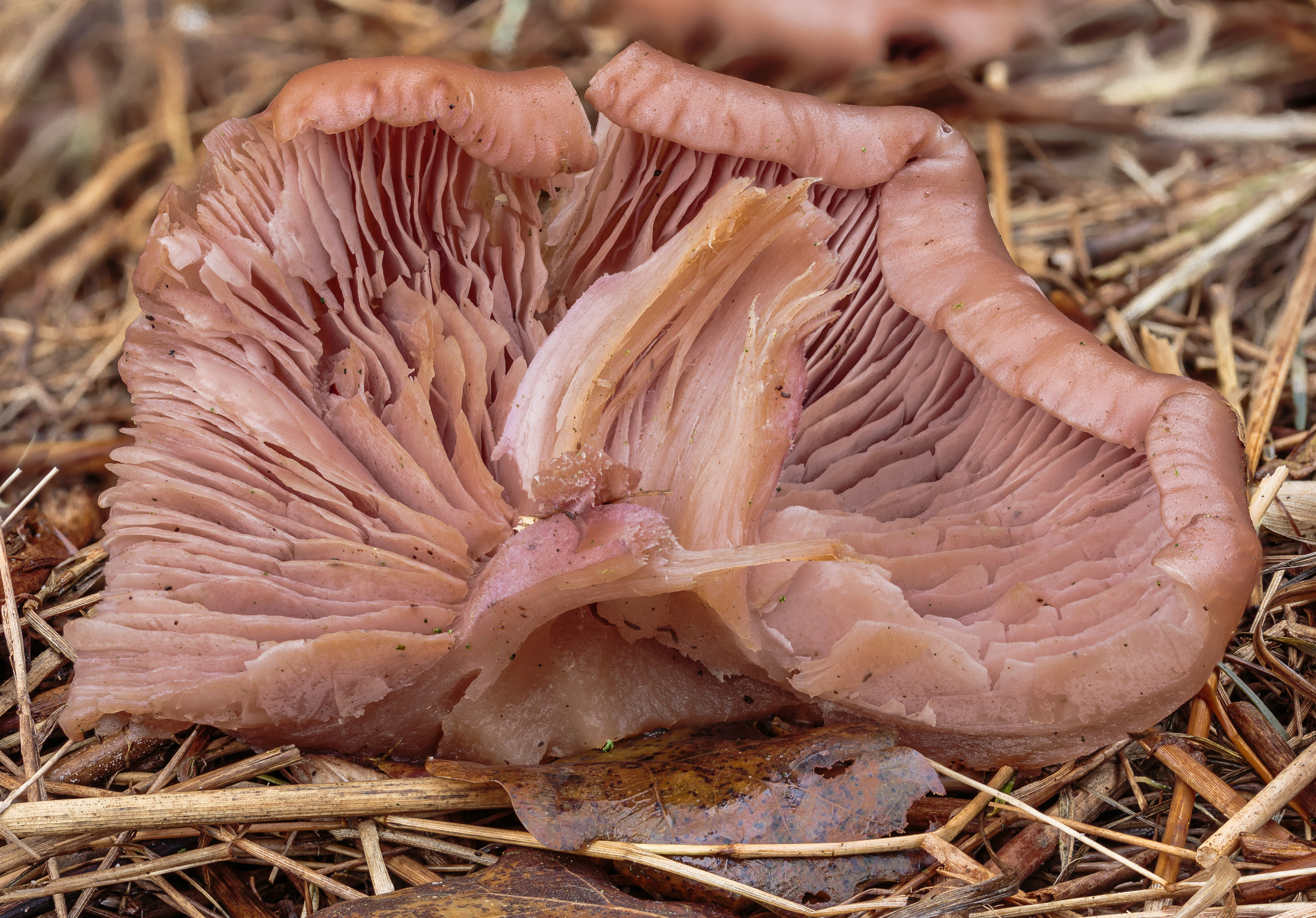
Fallen over on a compost heap.

This species was reassigned to the genus Collybia in 2023.

=== Names ===
The species is commonly known as the wood blewit. Cooke called it the amethyst lepista, John Sibthorp called it the blue-gilled agaric in his 1794 work Flora Oxoniensis.

== Description ==
This mushroom can range from lilac to purple-pink. Some North American specimens are duller and tend toward tan, but usually have purplish tones on the stem and gills. Younger specimens are lighter with more convex caps, while mature specimens have a darker color and flatter cap, ranging from 4–15 cm (1 1/2–6 in) in diameter. The gills are attached to the short, stout stem, which is about 2–6 cm (3/4–2 3/8 in) long and 1–2.5 cm wide, sometimes larger at the base. Wood blewits have a very distinctive odor, which has been likened by one author to that of frozen orange juice.

Wood blewits can be easily distinguished by their odor, as well as by their spore print, which is white to pale pink.

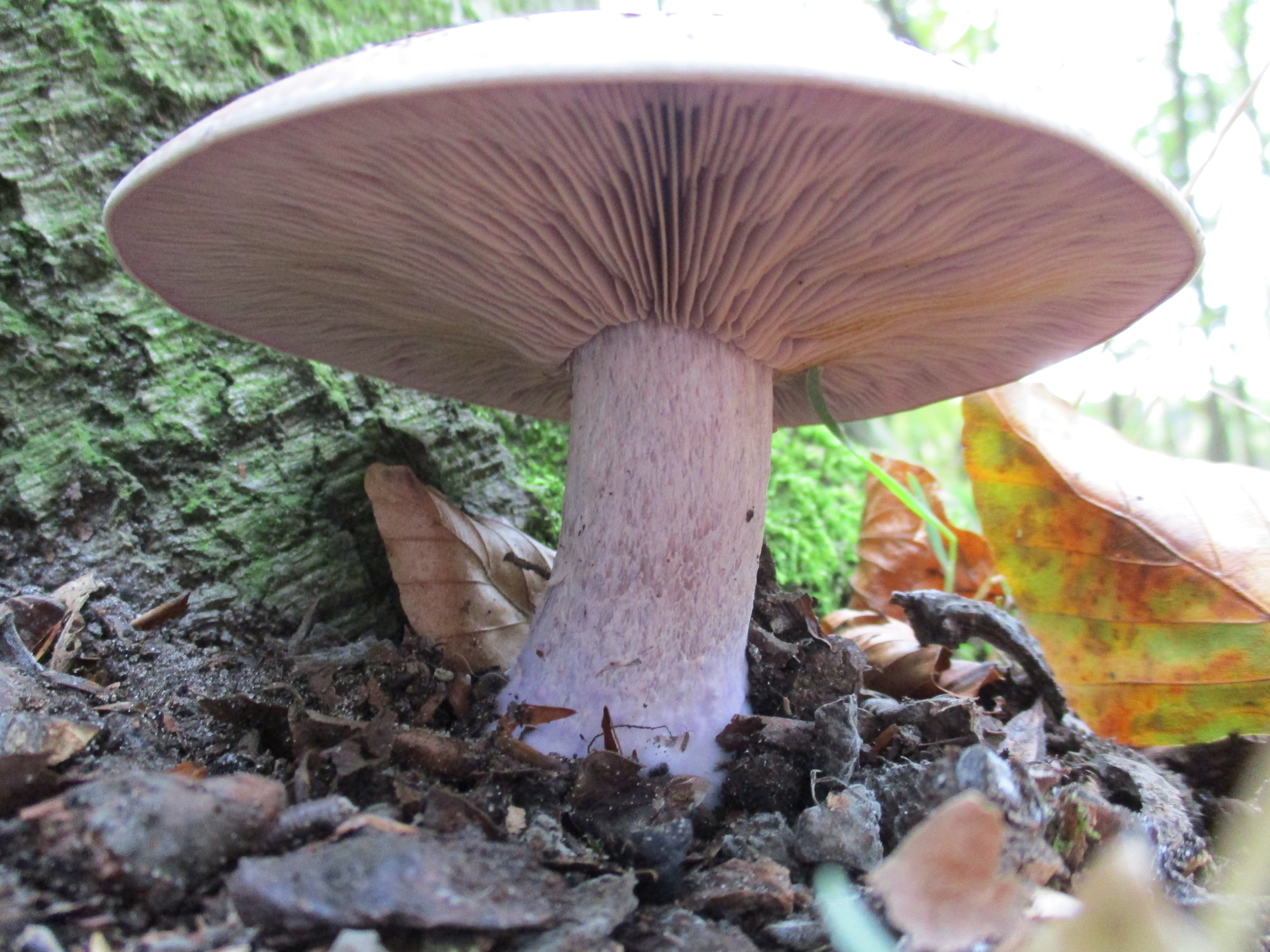
Lepista nuda

=== Similar species ===
Wood blewits can be confused with certain blue or purple species of the genus Cortinarius, including the uncommon C. camphoratus, many of which may be poisonous. Cortinarius mushrooms often have the remains of a veil under their caps and a ring-like impression on their stem. Cortinarius species produce a rusty brown spore print after several hours on white paper. Their brown spores often dust their stems and objects beneath them.

The species also resembles Collybia brunneocephala, Clitocybe tarda, Laccaria amethysteo-occidentalis, and Lepista subconnexa. It could be confused for members of the rare Texas genus Asproinocybe.

== Distribution and habitat ==
The wood blewit is found in Europe and North America and is becoming more common in Australia and New Zealand, where it appears to have been introduced. In Australia it has developed a relationship with some eucalyptus species and gorse; with an entirely different growth pattern and differs slightly in appearance to its European Lepista nuda cousins.

It is a saprotrophic species, growing on decaying leaf litter. In the United Kingdom, it appears from September through to December.

Soil analysis of soil containing mycelium from a wood blewit fairy ring under Norway spruce (Picea abies) and Scots pine (Pinus sylvestris) in southeast Sweden yielded fourteen halogenated low molecular weight organic compounds, three of which were brominated and the others chlorinated. It is unclear whether these were metabolites or pollutants. Brominated compounds are unknown as metabolites from terrestrial fungi.

The form glaucocana is found in mountainous environs.

== Ecology ==
In Australia, male satin bowerbirds collect blue objects to decorate their bowers with. A young male was reported to have collected wood blewits to this end near Braidwood in southern New South Wales.

== Edibility ==
Wood blewits are good edible mushrooms.

Blewits can be eaten as a cream sauce or sautéed in butter. They can also be cooked like tripe or as omelette filling, and also make good stewing mushrooms. They have a strong flavour, so they combine well with leeks or onions.

Wood blewits can be dried, or can be preserved in olive oil or white vinegar after blanching.

The wood blewit has been cultivated in Britain, the Netherlands and France. Cultivated wood blewits are said not to taste as good as wild wood blewits.

== Gallery ==
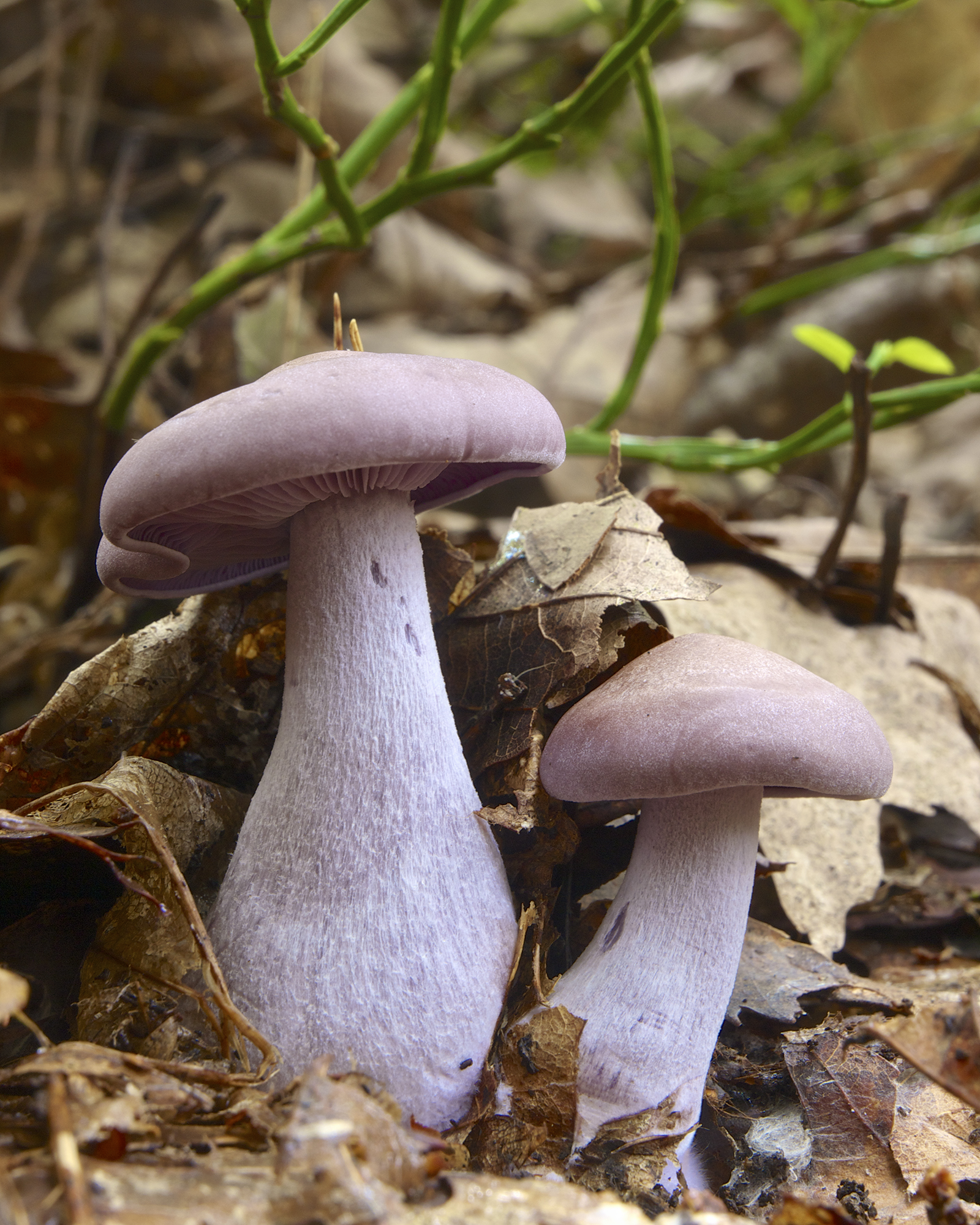

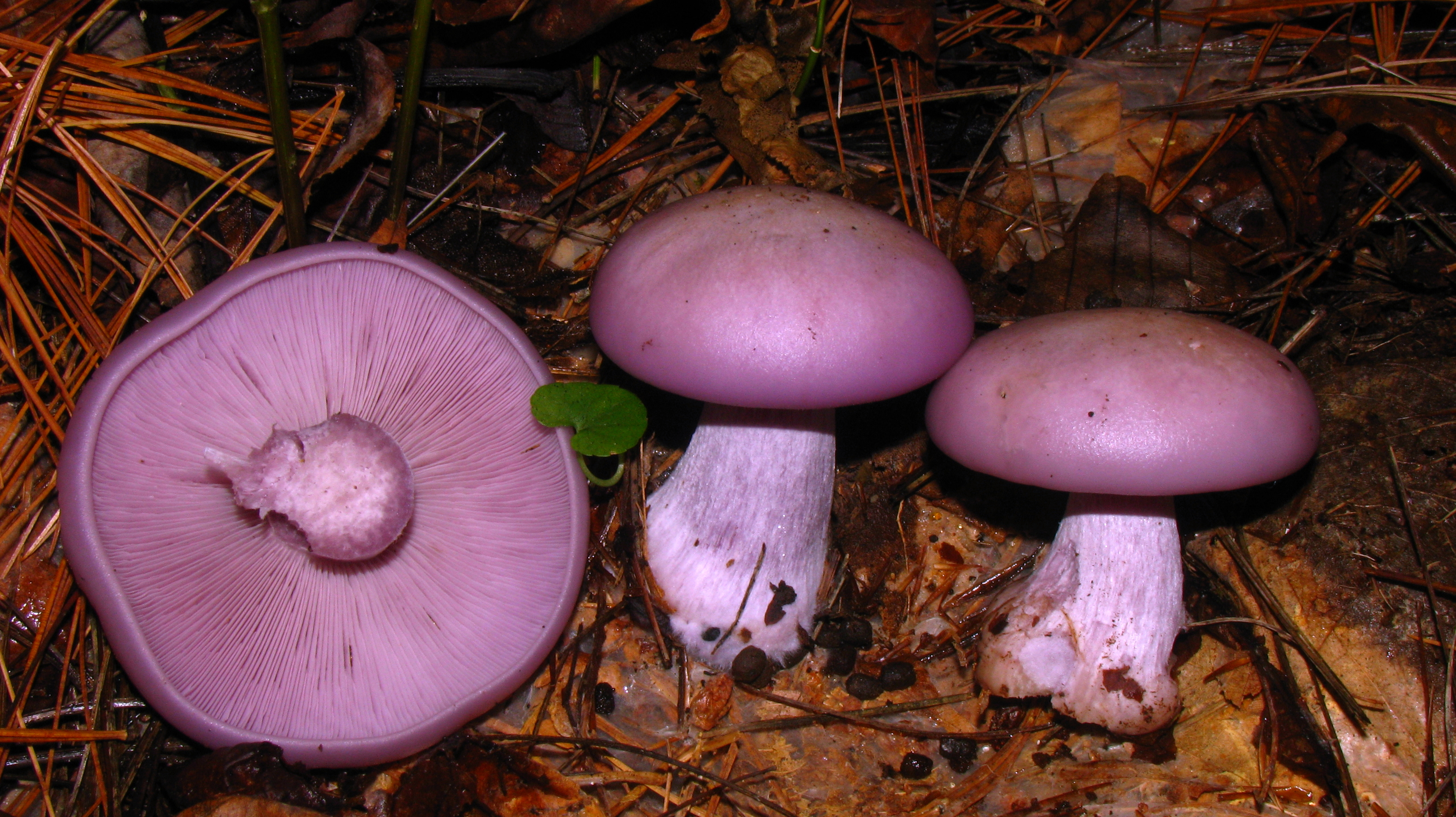

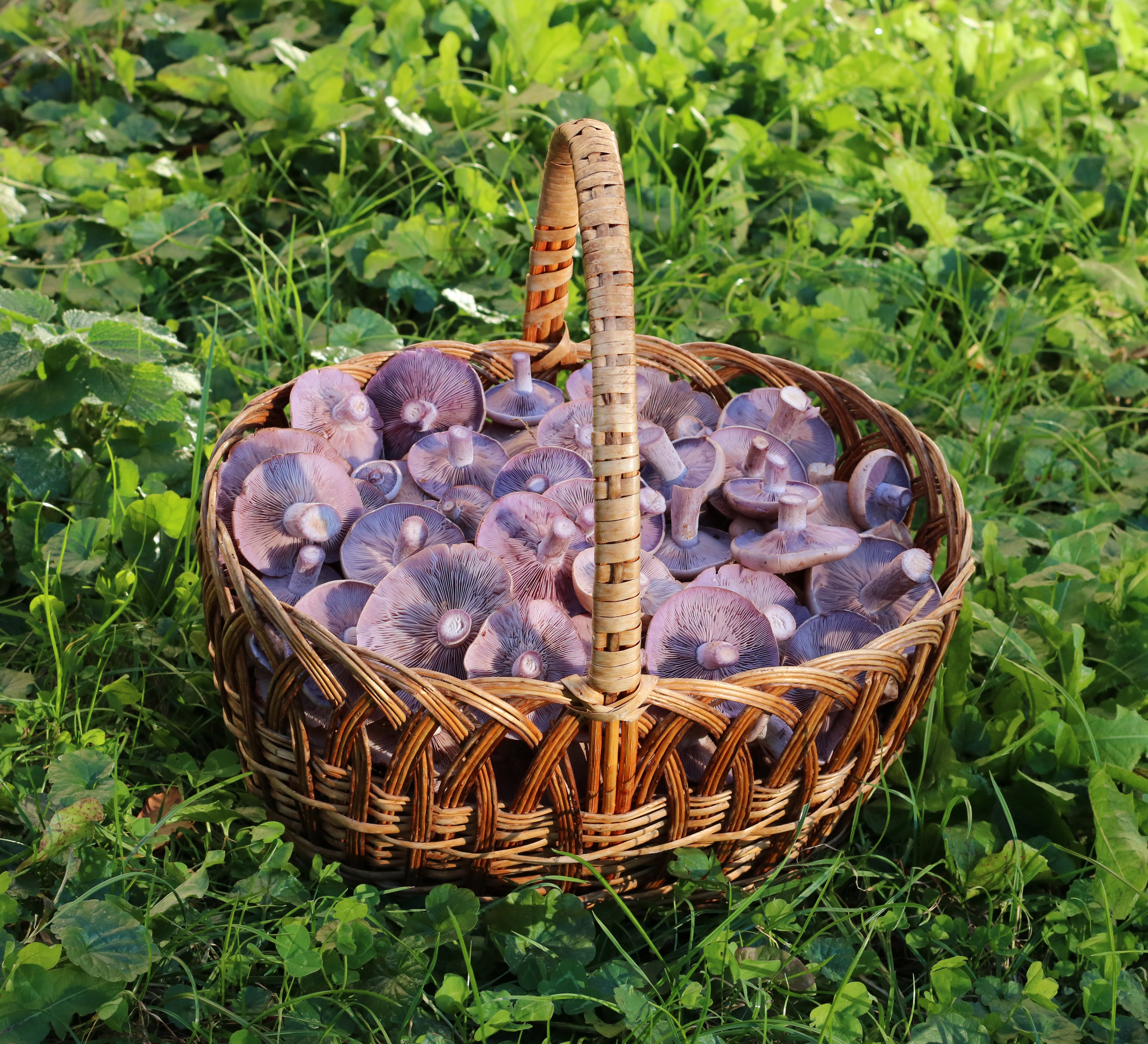

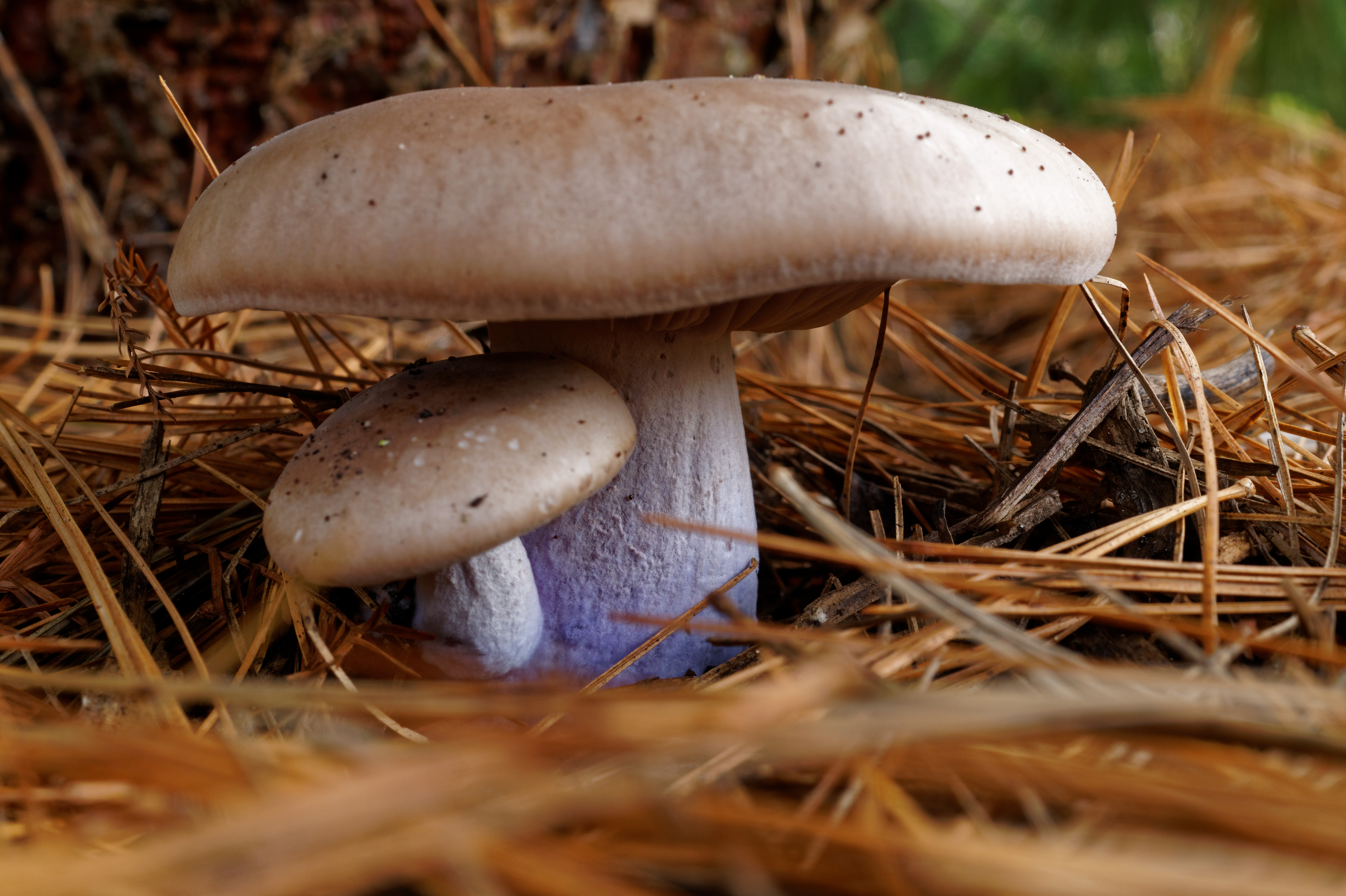

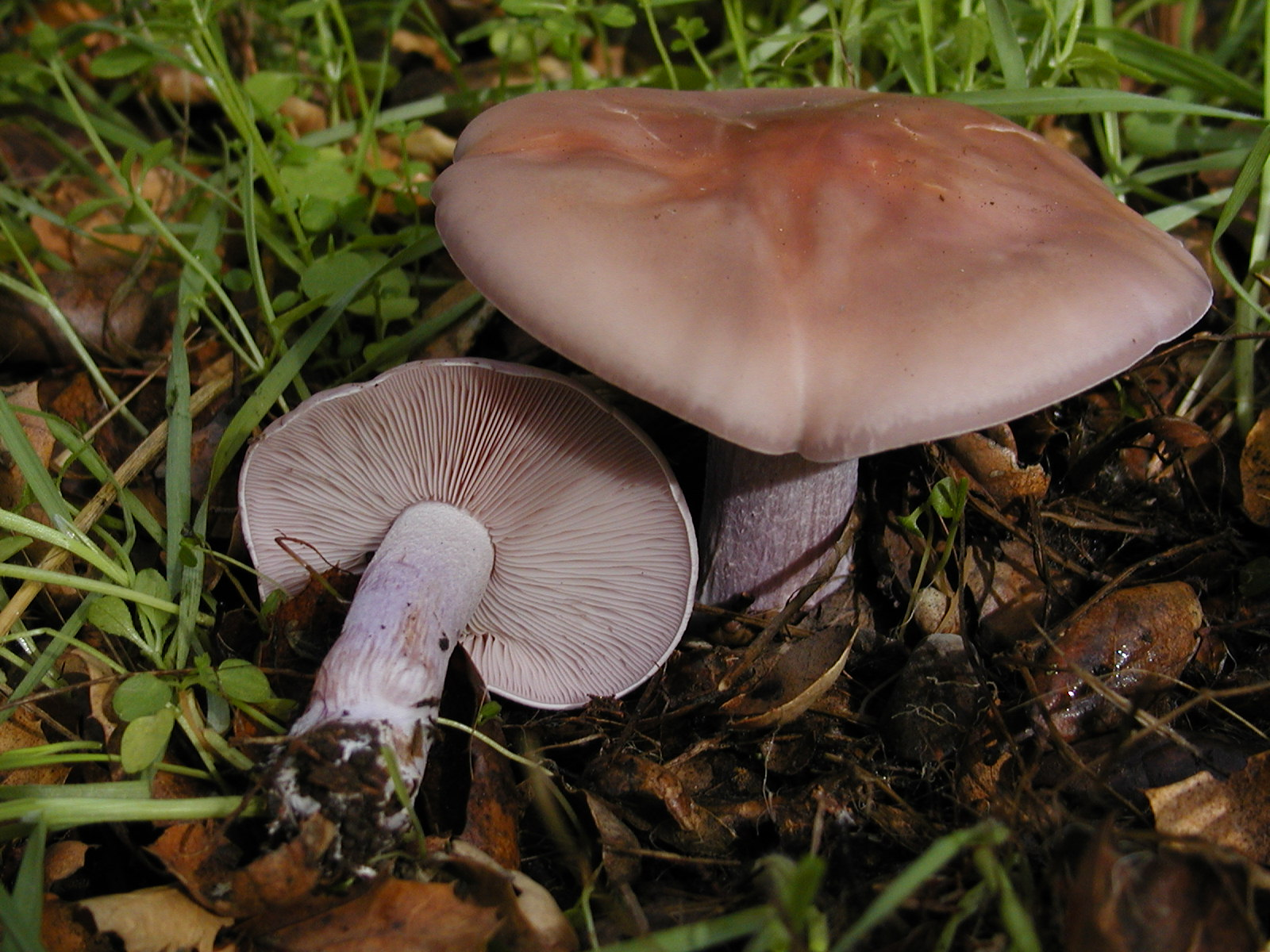

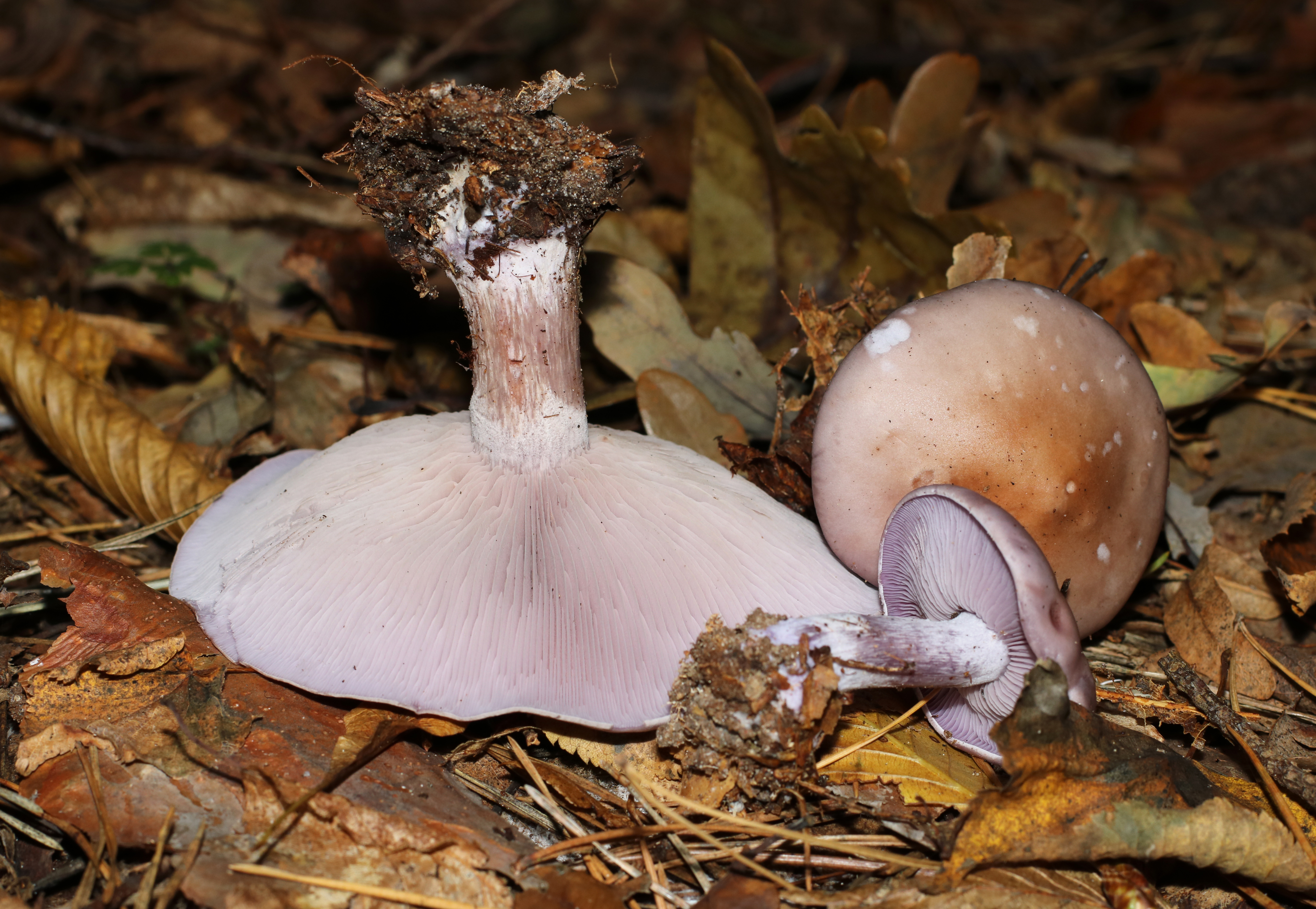
