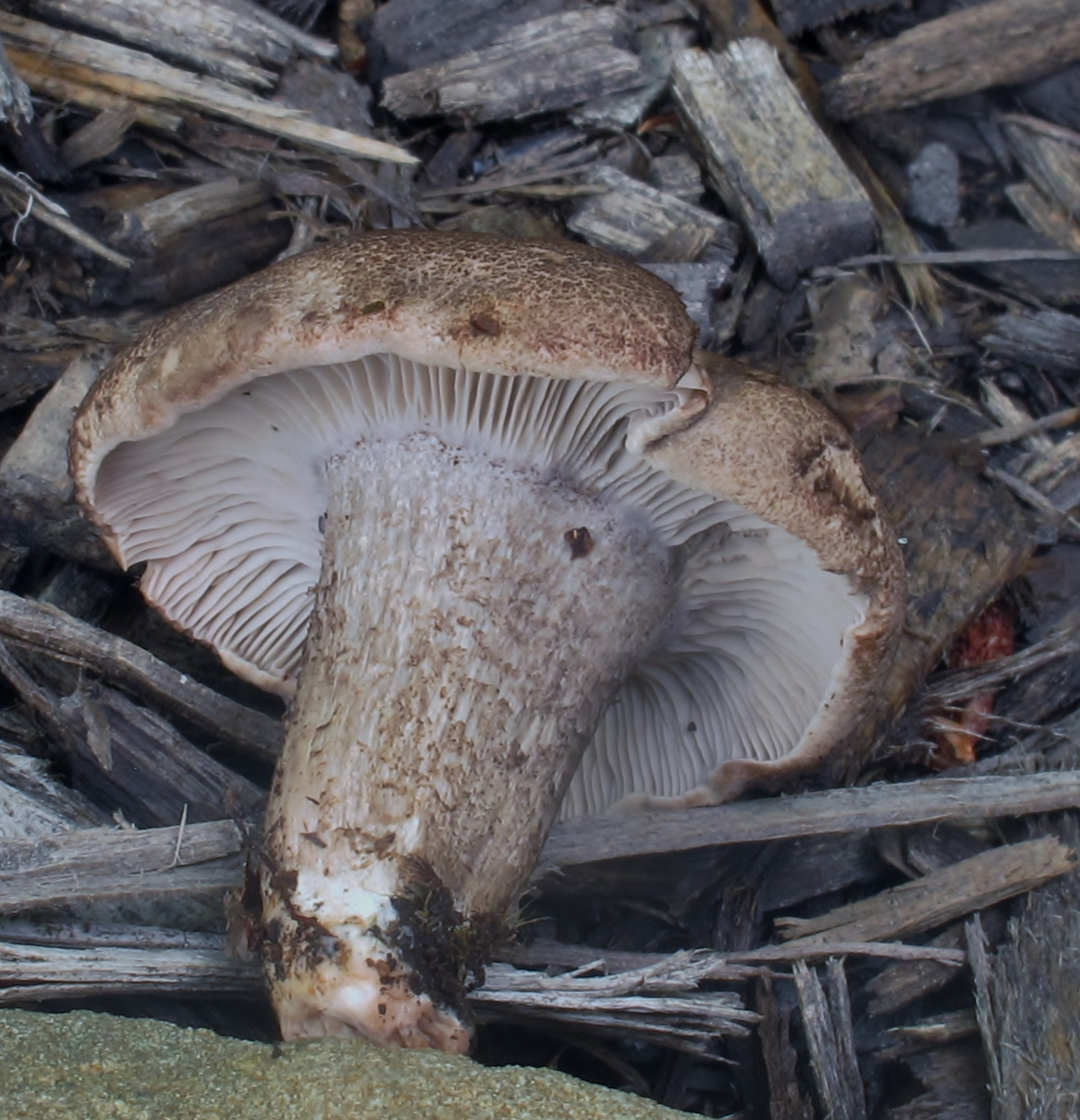
- Porpoloma umbrosum

Scientific classification
- Kingdom: Fungi
- Division: Basidiomycota
- Class: Agaricomycetes
- Order: Agaricales
- Family: Tricholomataceae
- Genus: Porpoloma; Singer (1952)

Type species
- Porpoloma sejunctum Singer (1952)

= Porpoloma =

Genus of fungi

Porpoloma is a genus of fungi in the family Tricholomataceae. The genus contains about 12 species found predominantly in South America. Porpoloma was described by mycologist Rolf Singer in 1952 with P. sejunctum as the type species.

== Species ==
- Porpoloma adrianii
- Porpoloma amyloideum
- Porpoloma aranzadii
- Porpoloma bambusarum
- Porpoloma boninense
- Porpoloma coyan
- Porpoloma elytroides
- Porpoloma juncicola
- Porpoloma mesotephrum
- Porpoloma penetrans
- Porpoloma pes-caprae
- Porpoloma portentosum
- Porpoloma sejunctum
- Porpoloma spinulosum
- Porpoloma terreum

== See also ==
- List of Tricholomataceae genera
