= Dennisiomyces =

Scientific classification
- Kingdom: Fungi
- Division: Basidiomycota
- Class: Agaricomycetes
- Order: Agaricales
- Family: Tricholomataceae
- Genus: Dennisiomyces; Singer (1955)

Type species
- Dennisiomyces glabrescentipes Singer (1955)

Species
- D. fuscoalbus D. glabrescentipes D. griseus D. lanzonii D. rionegrensis

Genus of fungi

Dennisiomyces is a genus of fungi in the family Tricholomataceae. Described by mycologist Rolf Singer in 1955, the genus contains five species found in South America.

The genus name of Dennisiomyces is in honour of Richard William George Dennis (1910 - 2003), British botanist (mycology) and plant pathologist.

== See also ==
- List of Agaricales genera
- List of Tricholomataceae genera
