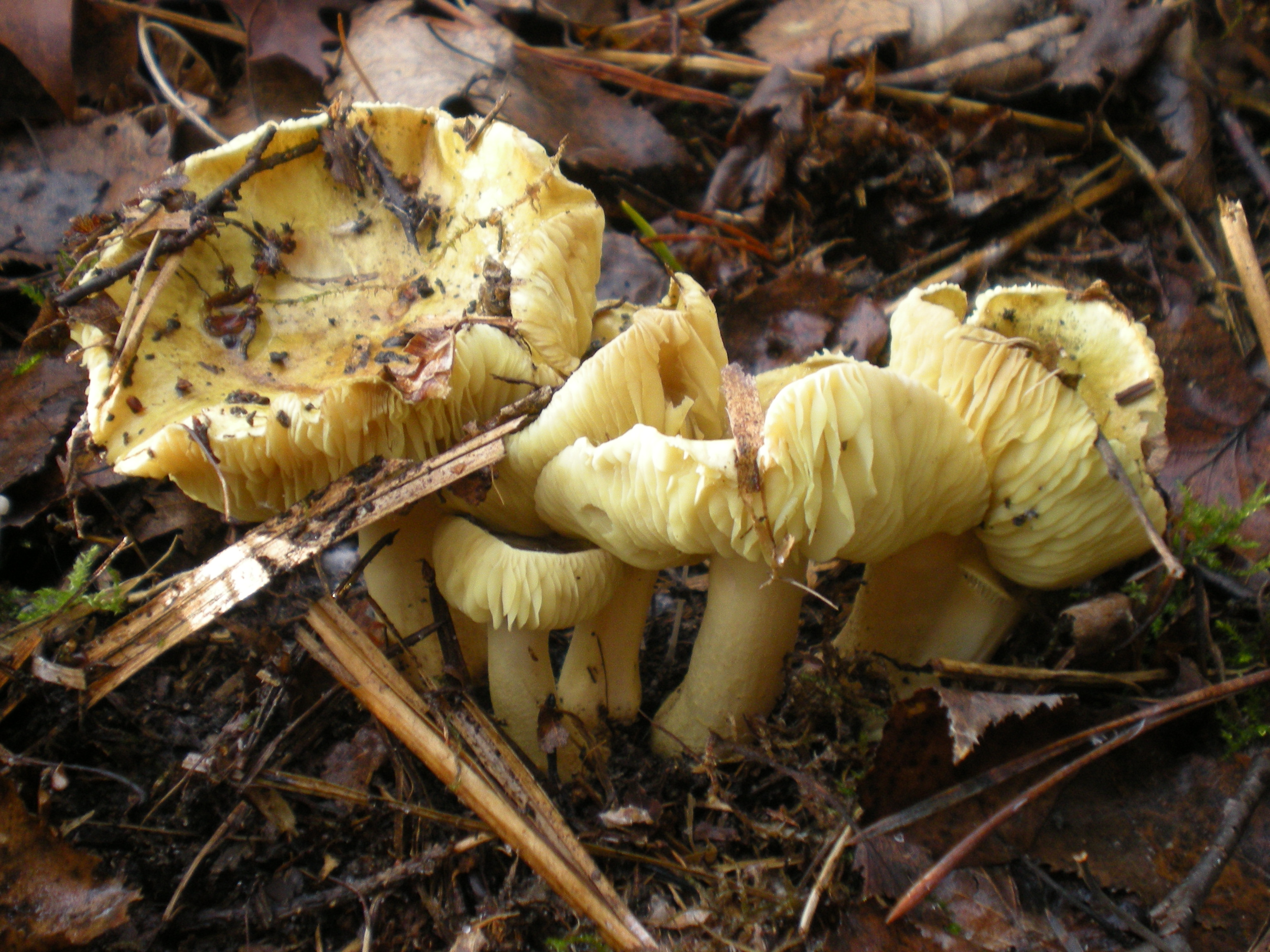
- Tricholoma flavovirens, near Wellfleet, Massachusetts, USA

Scientific classification
- Kingdom: Fungi
- Division: Basidiomycota
- Class: Agaricomycetes
- Order: Agaricales
- Suborder: Tricholomatineae
- Family: Tricholomataceae; R.Heim ex Pouzar (1983)

Type genus
- Tricholoma (Fr.) Staude (1857)

Genera
- 56

= Tricholomataceae =

Tricholomataceae Temporal range: Turonian–recent

Family of fungi

The Tricholomataceae are a large family of fungi within the order Agaricales. Originally a classic "wastebasket taxon", the family included any white-, yellow-, or pink-spored genera in the Agaricales not already classified as belonging to e.g. the Amanitaceae, Lepiotaceae, Hygrophoraceae, Pluteaceae, or Entolomataceae.

The name derives from the Greek trichos (τριχος) meaning hair and loma (λωμα) meaning fringe or border, although not all members display this feature.

The name "Tricholomataceae" is seen as having validity in describing Tricholoma and other genera that form part of a monophyletic family including Tricholoma. To that end, the International Botanical Congress has voted on two occasions (1988 and 2006) to conserve the name "Tricholomataceae" against competing names. This decision does not invalidate the use of segregate families from the Tricholomataceae, but simply validates the continued use of Tricholomataceae.

== Taxonomy ==
Molecular phylogenetic analysis has greatly aided the demarcation of clear monophyletic groups among the Tricholomataceae. So far, some of these groups have been defined cladistically rather than being defined as formal Linnean taxa, though there have been several cases in which older proposed segregates from the Tricholomataceae have been validated by evidence coming from molecular phylogenetics. As of 2006, validly published families segregated from the Tricholomataceae include the Hydnangiaceae, Lyophyllaceae, Marasmiaceae, Mycenaceae, Omphalotaceae, Physalacriaceae, and Pleurotaceae.

In 2014, a study recovered seven monophyletic genera within the Tricholomataceae: Leucopaxillus, Tricholoma, Pseudotricholoma, Porpoloma s.str, Dennisiomyces, Corneriella, and Albomagister. The aim of the study was to delimit the highly polyphyletic Tricholomataceae, and identify monophyletic groups within the tricholomatoid clade, which includes the families Tricholomataceae, Entolomataceae, and Lyophyllaceae. According to this study there have been several different ways of distributing Porpoloma, which is highly polyphyletic. This study suggests that the genus is distributed in four groups within the Trichlomatoid clade; Porpoloma s.str, Corneriella, Pseudotricholoma. and Pogonoloma.

In 2015, a phylogenomic study improved the resolution of Agaricales. A new suborder Tricholomatineae was proposed to cover Tricholomataceae, Lyophyllaceae, Entolomataceae, Macrocystidiaceae, and Clitocybe gibba. It roughly matches the "Tricholomatoid clade" of previous studies.

== Examples ==
Some species of fungus-growing ants in the genus Apterostigma cultivate species of Tricholomataceae.

The extinct genus Archaeomarasmius, described from Turonian-age New Jersey amber, is one of four known genera of Agaricales in the fossil record.

== See also ==
- List of Agaricales families
- List of Tricholomataceae genera
