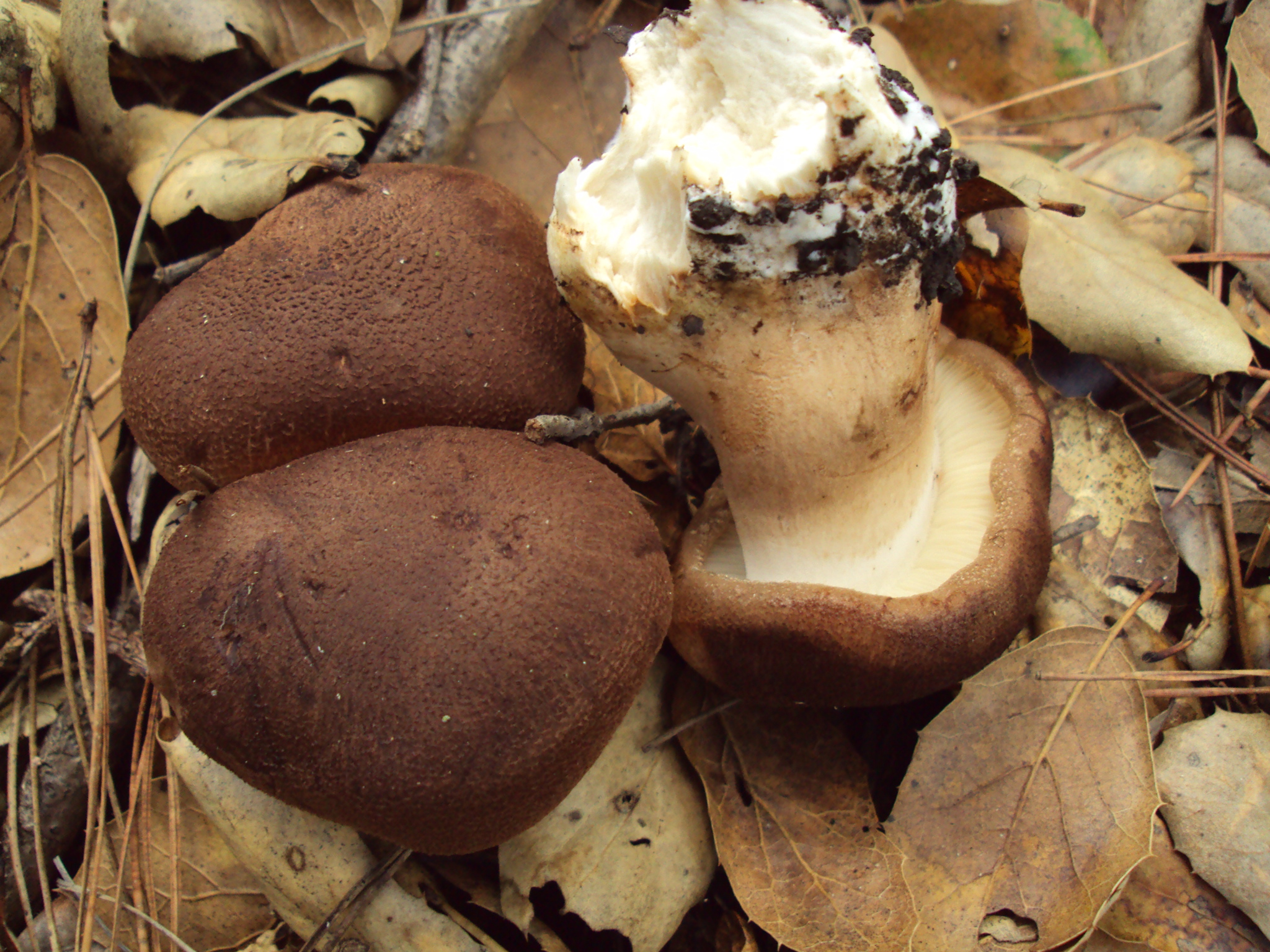

Scientific classification
- Kingdom: Fungi
- Division: Basidiomycota
- Class: Agaricomycetes
- Order: Agaricales
- Family: Tricholomataceae
- Genus: Tricholoma
- Species: T. imbricatum

Binomial name
- Tricholoma imbricatum (Fr.) P.Kumm. (1871)

Synonyms
- Agaricus imbricatus Fr. (1815); Agaricus vaccinus subsp. imbricatus (Fr.) Pers. (1828); Gyrophila imbricata (Fr.) Quél. (1886); Tricholoma subimbricatum Velen. (1920); Cortinellus imbricatus (Fr.) Raithelh. (1970)

= Tricholoma imbricatum =

Species of fungus

Tricholoma imbricatum Mycological characteristics
- Gills on hymenium
- Cap is flat
- Hymenium attachment is not applicable
- Stipe is bare
- Spore print is white
- Edibility is not recommended

Tricholoma imbricatum is a species of agaric fungus in the family Tricholomataceae commonly known as the matt knight.

== Description ==
The fruit bodies have a brown to reddish-brown cap, which is often scaly, and ranges from 6–18 cm (2 3/8–7 1/8 in) in diameter, and a stipe that is 3.5–12 cm (1 3/8–4 3/4 in) long by 1–3 cm (3/8–1 1/8 in) thick. The gills are adnexed to adnate and initially whitish in color before developing reddish-brown spots. The spores are white, as is the spore print.

=== Similar species ===
Similar species include Tricholoma dryophilum, T. fracticum, T. manzanitae, and T. vaccinum. Others which have viscid caps and are usually found in other environments include T. muricatum, T. populinum and T. ustale. Leucopaxillus amarus retains its white gills in age.

== Habitat and distribution ==
It grows on the ground in coniferous forests in North America and Europe.

== Edibility ==
The species may be edible, but has an unpalatable tough texture. It could also be confused with poisonous members of the T. pessundatum group.

== See also ==
- List of North American Tricholoma
- List of Tricholoma species
