= Tricholoma subannulatum =

Scientific classification
- Kingdom: Fungi
- Division: Basidiomycota
- Class: Agaricomycetes
- Order: Agaricales
- Family: Tricholomataceae
- Genus: Tricholoma
- Species: T. subannulatum

Binomial name
- Tricholoma subannulatum (Peck) Zeller (1922)

Synonyms
- Armillaria subannulata Peck (1909)

Species of fungus

Tricholoma subannulatum
- Mycological characteristics
- Gills on hymenium
- Cap is convex
- Hymenium is adnexed or sinuate
- Stipe is bare
- Spore print is white
- Ecology is mycorrhizal
- Edibility is unknown or poisonous

Tricholoma subannulatum is a species of mushroom in the family Tricholomataceae. It is part of the T. pessundatum species complex.

== Taxonomy ==
Tricholoma subannulatum was first described in 1909 by Charles Horton Peck, who described it as Armillaria subannulata. In 1922, Sanford Myron Zeller transferred it to the genus Tricholoma.

== Description ==
The cap of Tricholoma subannulatum is about 4-12 centimeters in diameter. It is convex, with an inrolled margin when young. It is brownish to orangish in color, with darker shades towards the center. The surface is smooth to appressed-fibrillose, and slimy when wet. The stipe is about 4-9 centimeters long and 1.5-3 centimeters wide. It is whitish at the top, and the stipe becomes brownish from the base up as the mushroom matures. The gills are whitish to pale yellowish. They bruise orangish brown and are adnexed and notched, with a white spore print.

=== Similar species ===
Tricholoma subannulatum is similar in appearance to T. dryophilum, but that species is skinnier in shape, has cheilocystidia, and has slightly bigger spores. T. ammophilum is also similar, but it grows under cottonwood and aspen. Older specimens of T. manzanitae is also similar, but that species grows under madrone and manzanita. T. fulvum is also similar but grows under conifers and birch, while T. albobrunneum grows under pine.

== Habitat and distribution ==
Tricholoma subannulatum is found in the Pacific Northwest, where it grows under Garry oak.
