= Tricholoma ammophilum =

Scientific classification
- Kingdom: Fungi
- Division: Basidiomycota
- Class: Agaricomycetes
- Order: Agaricales
- Family: Tricholomataceae
- Genus: Tricholoma
- Species: T. ammophilum

Binomial name
- Tricholoma ammophilum A.D. Parker, Grubisha & S.A. Trudell (2021)

Species of fungus

Tricholoma ammophilum
- Mycological characteristics
- Gills on hymenium
- Cap is convex or flat
- Hymenium is adnexed or sinuate
- Stipe is bare
- Spore print is white
- Ecology is mycorrhizal
- Edibility is edible

Tricholoma ammophilum, commonly known as the sandy or sand-loving trich, is a species of mushroom in the family Tricholomataceae. It grows in sandy soil under cottonwood. It is edible, but can easily be confused with poisonous species. It was first described in 2021.

== Description ==
Tricholoma ammophilum has a reddish brown to orangish brown, slimy cap. The cap is about 4-12 centimeters in diameter. The stipe is whitish in color, as are the gills. The stipe is about 4-10 centimeters long and 1-3 centimeters wide. The stipe and gills can develop reddish brown stains. The spore print is white, and the scent is farinaceous.

=== Similar species ===
Tricholoma ammophilum has many lookalikes. T. fulvum can be similar, but it is typically taller and grows under birch and conifers. T. subannulatum and T. dryophilum are similar as well, but they grow under oak. T. albobrunneum is also similar, but it grows under pine and is thicker. Tricholoma populinum is extremely similar to T. ammophilum, but grows in Europe.

== Habitat and distribution ==
Tricholoma ammophilum is found in the Pacific Northwest, where it grows under aspen and cottonwood. It is found in sandy soil.
