= Melanoleuca turrita =

Scientific classification
- Domain: Eukaryota
- Kingdom: Fungi
- Division: Basidiomycota
- Class: Agaricomycetes
- Order: Agaricales
- Family: Tricholomataceae
- Genus: Melanoleuca
- Species: M. turrita

Binomial name
- Melanoleuca turrita (Fr.) Singer

Species of fungus

Melanoleuca turrita is a species of fungus belonging to the family Tricholomataceae.

It is native to Europe.
