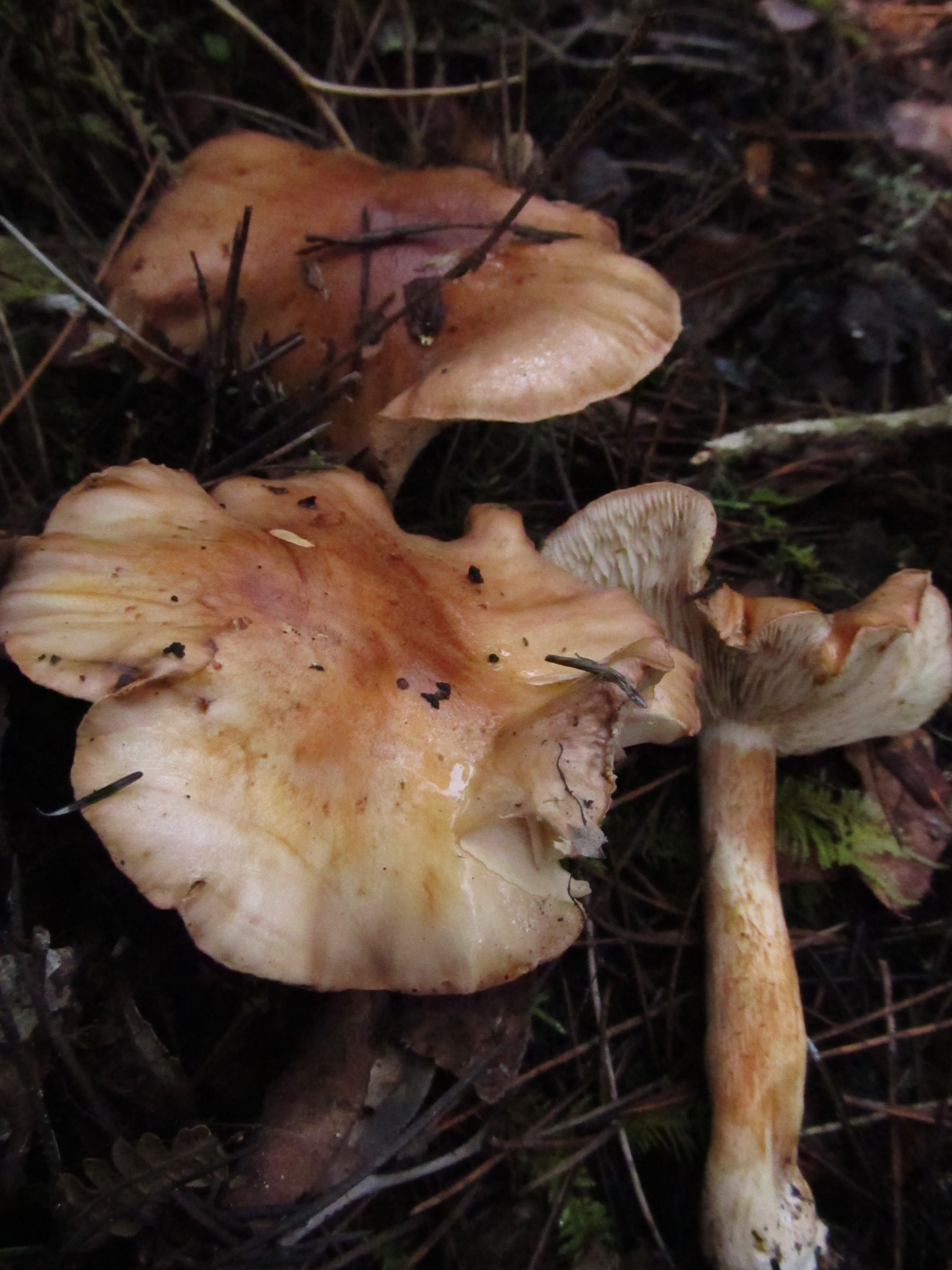

Scientific classification
- Domain: Eukaryota
- Kingdom: Fungi
- Division: Basidiomycota
- Class: Agaricomycetes
- Order: Agaricales
- Family: Tricholomataceae
- Genus: Tricholoma
- Species: T. muricatum

Binomial name
- Tricholoma muricatum Shanks (1996)

= Tricholoma muricatum =

Species of fungus

Tricholoma muricatum is a mushroom of the agaric genus Tricholoma. It was described as new to science in 1996. It tends to grow near pines.

The cap has a radial arrangement of fibres and is grooved near the edge. The gills are orange-white. The stipe is brown-orange.

A very similar species is the European Tricholoma pessundatum, which differs only in microscopic details. Other similar species include T. aurantium, T. fracticum, T. fulvum, T. manzanitae, T. nictitans, T. populinum, T. stans, and T. ustale. All of these species, including T. muricatum, are inedible.

== See also ==
- List of North American Tricholoma
- List of Tricholoma species
