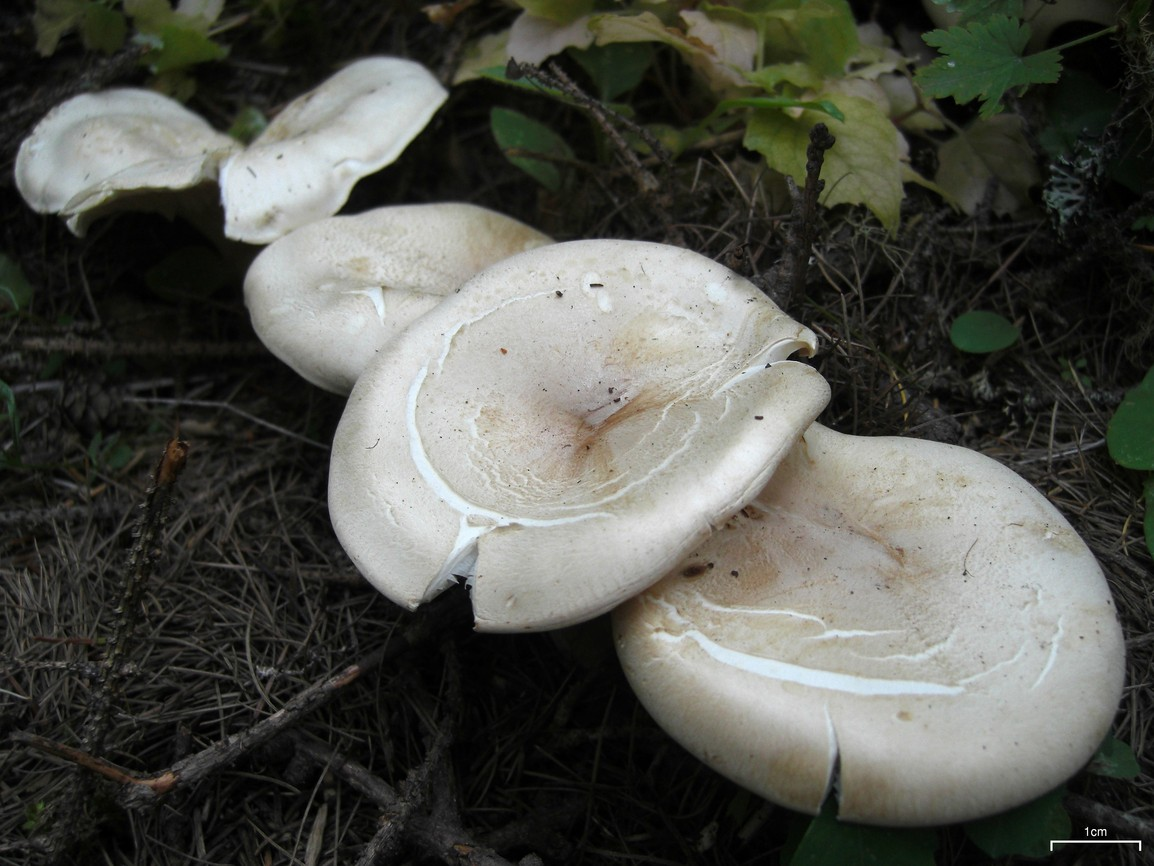

Scientific classification
- Kingdom: Fungi
- Division: Basidiomycota
- Class: Agaricomycetes
- Order: Agaricales
- Family: Tricholomataceae
- Genus: Leucopaxillus
- Species: L. albissimus

Binomial name
- Leucopaxillus albissimus (Peck) Singer (1939)

Synonyms
- Agaricus albissimus Peck (1873)

= Leucopaxillus albissimus =

Species of fungus

Leucopaxillus albissimus
- Mycological characteristics
- Gills on hymenium
- Cap is convex or flat
- Hymenium is decurrent
- Stipe is bare
- Spore print is white
- Ecology is saprotrophic
- Edibility is inedible

Leucopaxillus albissimus, commonly known as the large white leucopaxillus, is a species of mushroom that lives as a saprobe, decaying the litter under coniferous trees. It produces a large white fruiting body that is unusually resistant to decay. It is considered inedible.

== Description ==
The species is generally white, with albissimus meaning 'whitest' in Latin.

The cap is 4–20 centimetres (1 1/2–8 in) wide, exceptionally up to 40 cm, and slowly changes from convex to plane; occasionally the disc is depressed. When young, the margin is incurved and faintly striate. The cap's surface is dry, unpolished, and smooth; in moderate weather, it becomes scaled and a shade of cream to cream-buff. As it ages, the cap's surface turns buff-tan. Overall, the flesh is white, moderately thick, and has a mild odor.

The gills are crowded, broad, and decurrent. Although they are originally cream-colored, the gills turn buff-tan with age. Varying from 3–7 cm in length, the stipe is 2.5–4 cm thick, stout, and often enlarged at the base. The surface of the stipe varies from smooth to finely-scaled and is a cream color when young; it may turn buff-tan in age. When handled, it bruises pale buff-brown at the base.

The spore print is white. The elliptical spores are ornamented with amyloid warts. The spores measure 5–7 x 3.5–5 μm.

The species demonstrates a tendency not to rot, with the biological reason for this unknown.

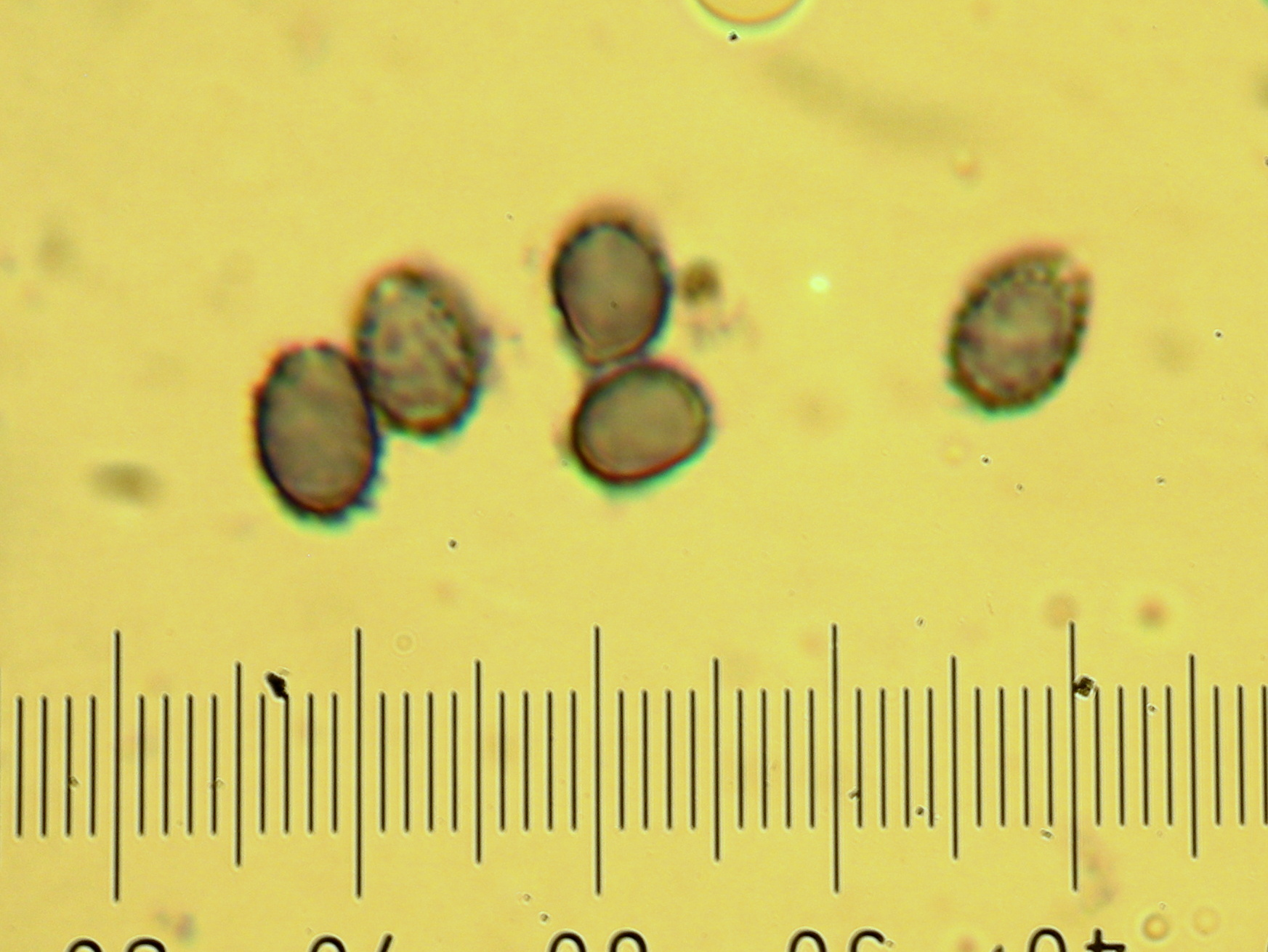
Spores

=== Similar species ===
Leucopaxillus gentianeus is closely related. Clitocybe species may appear similar due to the decurrent gills.

== Habitat ==
Primarily residing under conifers and hardwoods, L. albimissus is often scattered or gregarious in arcs or rings. It fruits from mid to late winter in California, and in autumn in other parts of North America.

== Edibility ==
It is considered inedible, resisting all but the most thorough cooking.
