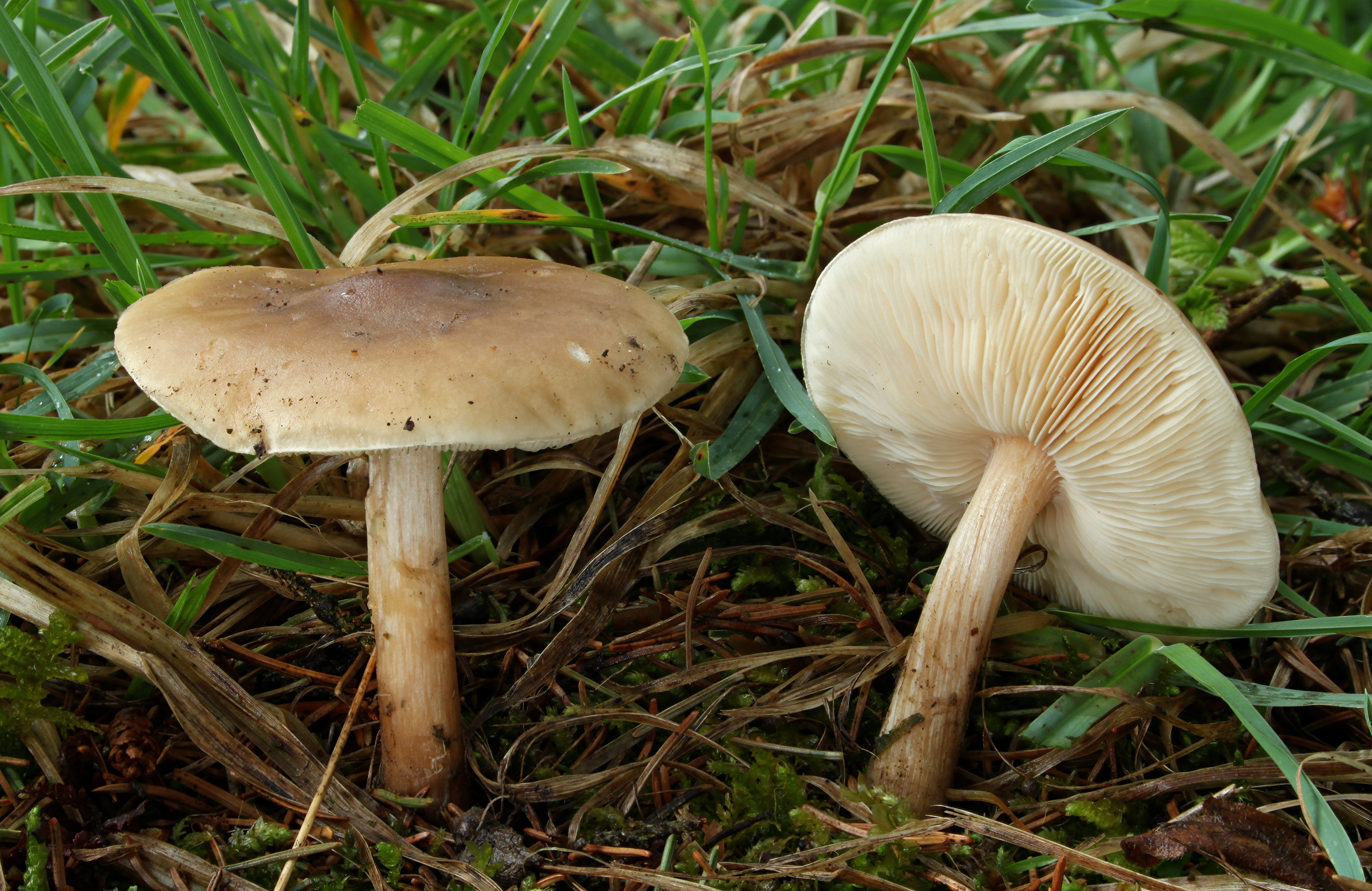

Scientific classification
- Kingdom: Fungi
- Division: Basidiomycota
- Class: Agaricomycetes
- Order: Agaricales
- Family: Tricholomataceae
- Genus: Melanoleuca
- Species: M. cognata

Binomial name
- Melanoleuca cognata (Fr.) Konrad & Maubl. (1927)

Synonyms
- Agaricus arcuatus var. cognatus Fr. (1874)

= Melanoleuca cognata =

Species of fungus

Melanoleuca cognata
- Mycological characteristics
- Gills on hymenium
- Cap is convex
- Stipe is bare
- Spore print is cream to yellow
- Edibility is edible

Melanoleuca cognata, commonly known as the spring cavalier, is a species of agaric fungus.

The mushroom is fairly tall for species of its genus. The cap is 5–13 centimetres (2–5 in) wide, semi-viscid, and orange to red-brown, lightening in age. The gills are a shade of ochre and typically notched. The stipe is 6–12 cm (2 1/4–4 3/4 in) long and up to 2 cm thick. The odour is mild to sweetish. The spore print is creamy.

The species may be difficult to identify without analysis of its microscopic features.

The species is found in Europe and North America in forests, meadows, and parks. It is edible.
