= Leucopaxillus paradoxus =

Scientific classification
- Domain: Eukaryota
- Kingdom: Fungi
- Division: Basidiomycota
- Class: Agaricomycetes
- Order: Agaricales
- Family: Tricholomataceae
- Genus: Leucopaxillus
- Species: L. paradoxus

Binomial name
- Leucopaxillus paradoxus (Costantin & L.M.Dufour) Boursier (1925)

Synonyms
- Clitocybe paradoxa Costantin & L.M.Dufour (1896); Lepista paradoxa (Costantin & L.M. Dufour) Maire (1825); Leucopaxillus albissimus var. paradoxus (Costantin & L.M.Dufour) Singer & A.H.Sm (1943)

Species of fungus

Leucopaxillus is a species of fungus in the family Tricholomataceae, and the type species of the genus Leucopaxillus. It was first described as Clitocybe paradoxa in 1896, and transferred to the newly created Leucopaxillus in 1925. It is found in Asia, Europe, and North America.
