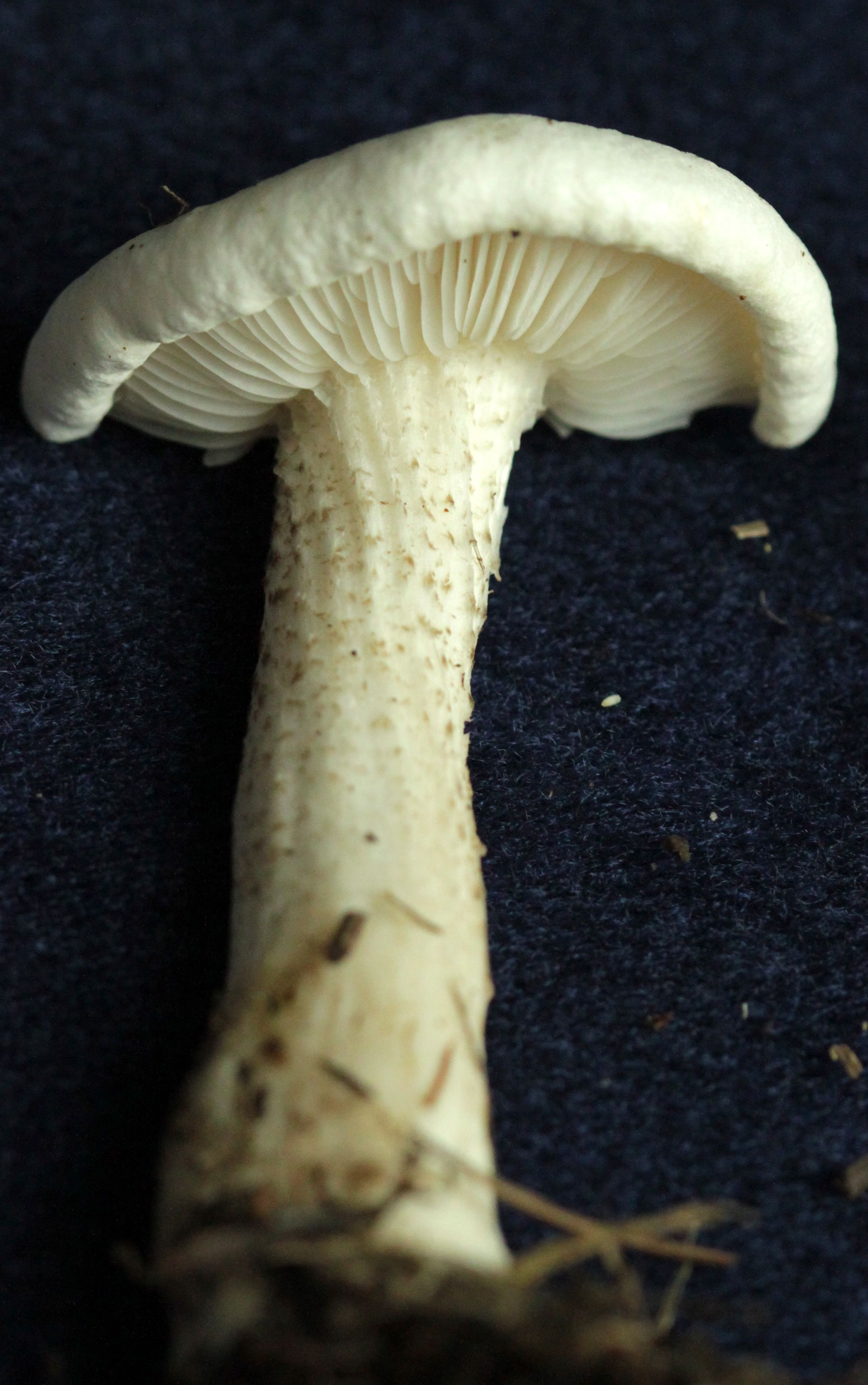

Scientific classification
- Kingdom: Fungi
- Division: Basidiomycota
- Class: Agaricomycetes
- Order: Agaricales
- Family: Tricholomataceae
- Genus: Melanoleuca
- Species: M. verrucipes

Binomial name
- Melanoleuca verrucipes Singer (1939)

Synonyms
- Armillaria verrucipes Fr. (1872); Agaricus verrucipes (Fr.) Fr. (1874); Gyrophila verrucipes (Fr.) Quél. (1886)

= Melanoleuca verrucipes =

Species of fungus

Melanoleuca verrucipes is a species of fungus in the family Tricholomataceae. It is described as being a "very distinct species with its blackish dotted stipe." It was reportedly first discovered on leaf mulch in Highgate Woods, north London. The edibility of the mushroom is not known with certainty.
