= Melanoleuca privernensis =

Scientific classification
- Kingdom: Fungi
- Division: Basidiomycota
- Class: Agaricomycetes
- Order: Agaricales
- Family: Tricholomataceae
- Genus: Melanoleuca
- Species: M. privernensis

Binomial name
- Melanoleuca privernensis (Consiglio, Contu, Setti & Vizzini) Consiglio, Setti & Vizzini

Synonyms
- Kinia privernensis Consiglio, Contu, Setti & Vizzini

Species of fungus

Melanoleuca privernensis is a species of fungus in the Pluteaceae family. It was originally named Kinia privernensis in 2008 and a new genus Kinia was erected to contain it. Two years later, molecular analysis showed that it was closely related to Melanoleuca, and Kinia was reduced to a subgenus of Melanoleuca.
