= Melanoleuca abutyracea =

Scientific classification
- Kingdom: Fungi
- Division: Basidiomycota
- Class: Agaricomycetes
- Order: Agaricales
- Family: Tricholomataceae
- Genus: Melanoleuca
- Species: M. abutyracea

Binomial name
- Melanoleuca abutyracea (Cleland) Grgur. (1985)

Synonyms
- Collybia abutyracea Cleland (1931)

Species of fungus

Melanoleuca abutyracea is a species of fungus in the family Pluteaceae. Found in Australia, it was first described scientifically in 1931 by John Burton Cleland as a species of Collybia. Mycologist Cheryl Grgurinovic transferred it to Melanoleuca in 2002.
