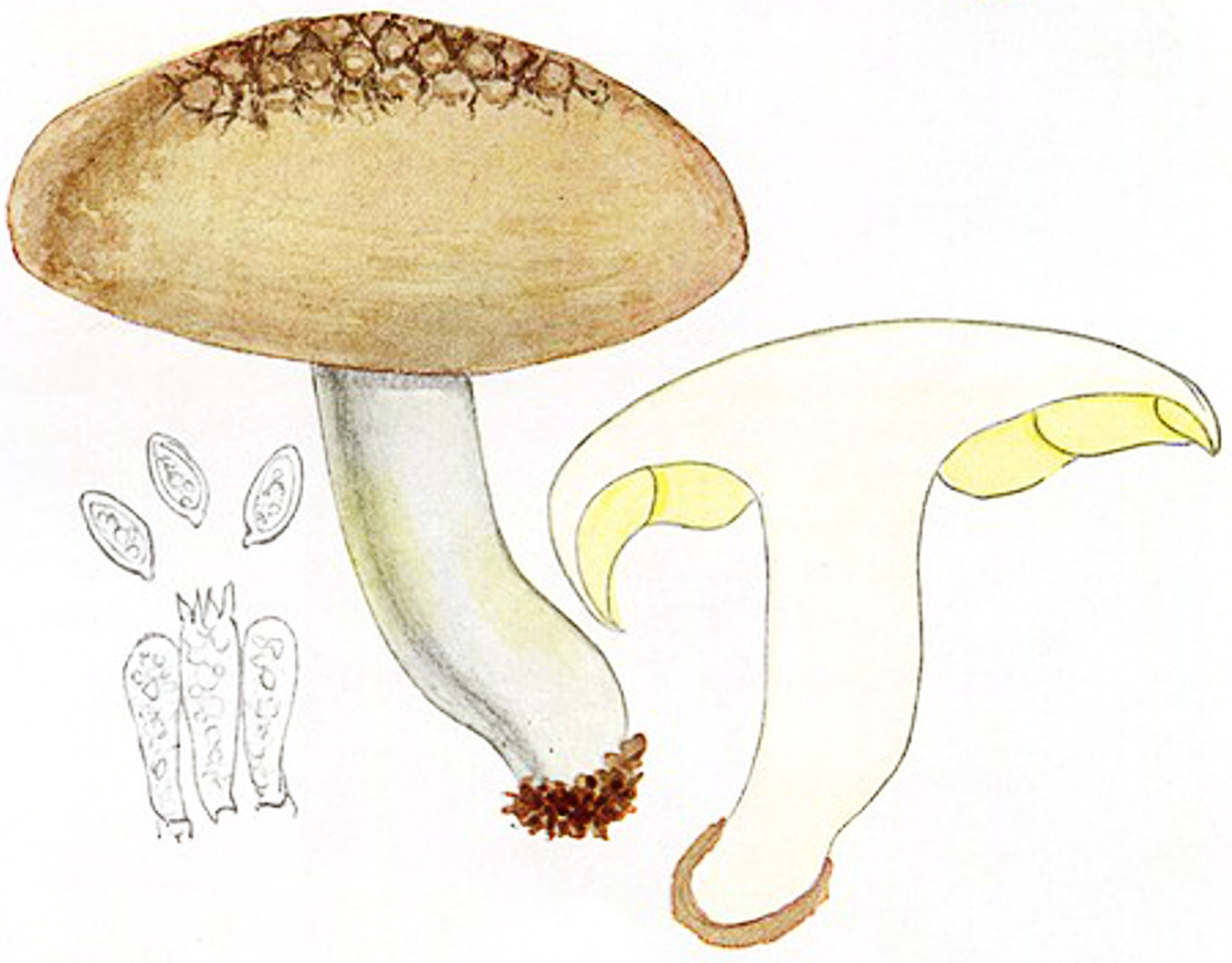

Scientific classification
- Domain: Eukaryota
- Kingdom: Fungi
- Division: Basidiomycota
- Class: Agaricomycetes
- Order: Agaricales
- Family: Tricholomataceae
- Genus: Leucopaxillus
- Species: L. compactus

Binomial name
- Leucopaxillus compactus (Fr.) Neuhoff

= Leucopaxillus compactus =

Species of fungus

Leucopaxillus compactus is a species of fungus belonging to the family Tricholomataceae.

It is native to Europe.
