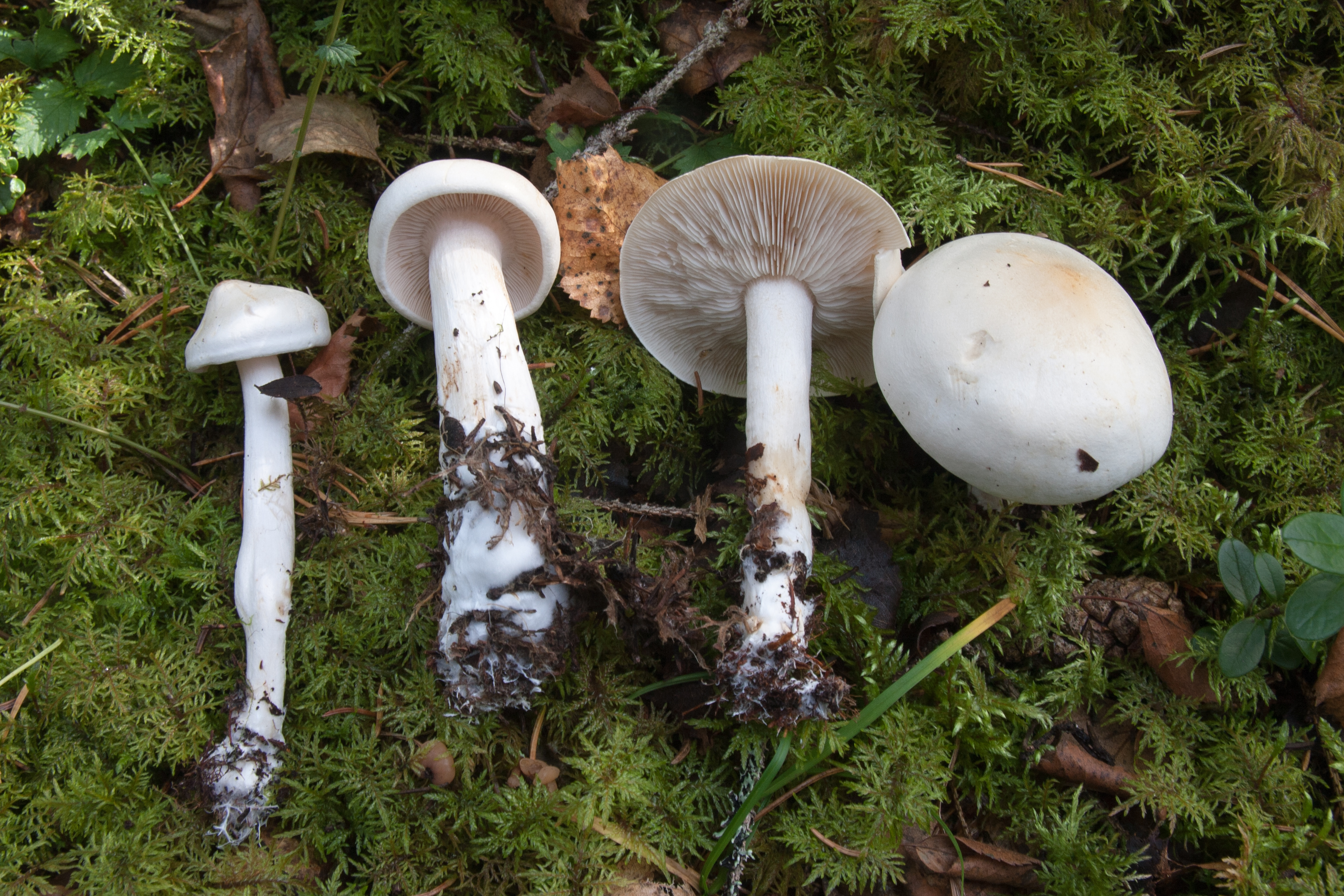

Scientific classification
- Domain: Eukaryota
- Kingdom: Fungi
- Division: Basidiomycota
- Class: Agaricomycetes
- Order: Agaricales
- Family: Tricholomataceae
- Genus: Leucopaxillus
- Species: L. alboalutaceus

Binomial name
- Leucopaxillus alboalutaceus (F.H.Møller & Jul.Schäff.) F.H.Møller

= Leucopaxillus alboalutaceus =

Species of fungus

Leucopaxillus alboalutaceus is a species of fungus belonging to the family Tricholomataceae.

It is native to Europe and Northern America.
