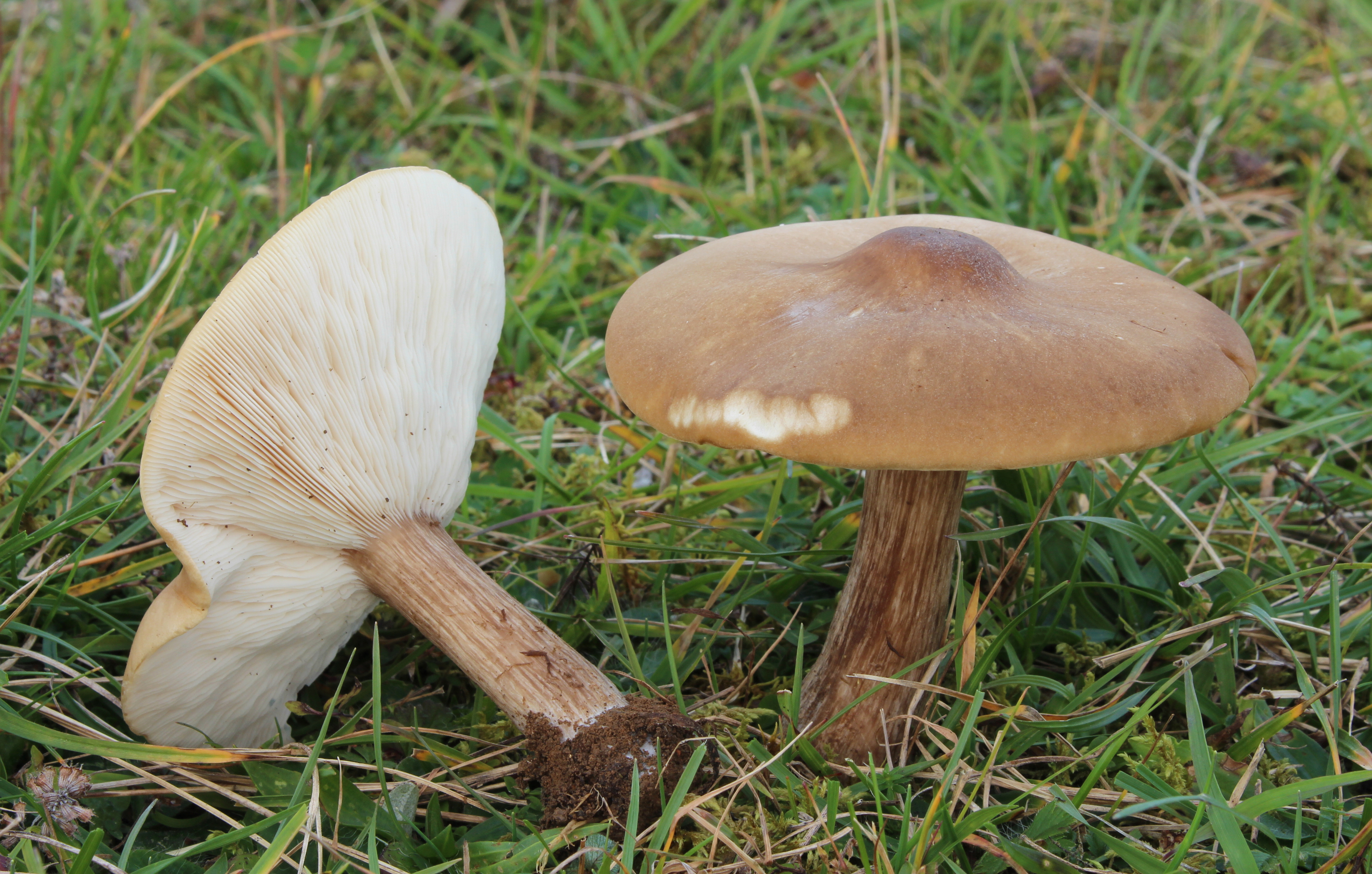

Scientific classification
- Kingdom: Fungi
- Division: Basidiomycota
- Class: Agaricomycetes
- Order: Agaricales
- Family: Tricholomataceae
- Genus: Melanoleuca
- Species: M. grammopodia

Binomial name
- Melanoleuca grammopodia (Bull.) Fayod 1889

= Melanoleuca grammopodia =

Species of fungus

Melanoleuca privernensis is a species of fungus in the Pluteaceae family.
