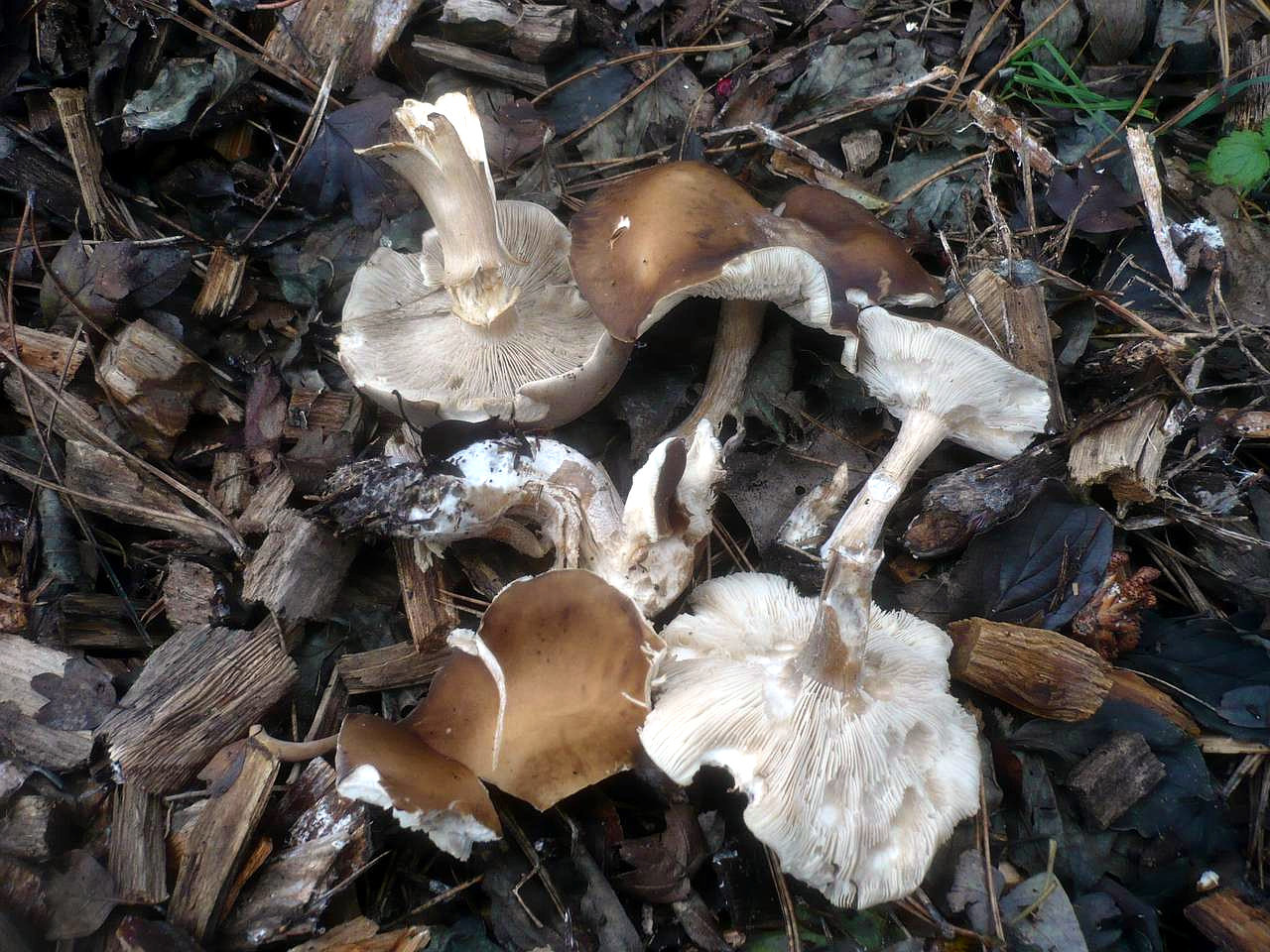

Scientific classification
- Kingdom: Fungi
- Division: Basidiomycota
- Class: Agaricomycetes
- Order: Agaricales
- Family: Tricholomataceae
- Genus: Melanoleuca
- Species: M. melaleuca

Binomial name
- Melanoleuca melaleuca (Persoon) Murrill

Synonyms
- 1801 Agaricus melaleucus Pers. 1871 Tricholoma melaleucum (Pers.) P.Kumm. 1886 Gyrophila melaleuca (Pers.) Quél. 1887 Melaleuca vulgaris Pat. 1889 Boletopsis melaleuca (Pers.) Fayod; 1897 Melanoleuca vulgaris (Pat.) Pat.

= Melanoleuca melaleuca =

Melanoleuca melaleuca
- Mycological characteristics
- Gills on hymenium
- Cap is convex or umbonate
- Hymenium is emarginate
- Stipe is bare
- Spore print is white
- Ecology is saprotrophic
- Edibility is unknown

Melanoleuca melaleuca is a species of mushroom in the family Tricholomataceae, and it is the type species of its genus Melanoleuca. It is difficult to distinguish from other related species firstly because it is variable, secondly because the taxonomic criteria are often based on characteristics which have later been found to be variable, and thirdly because there is much disagreement between authorities as to an exact species definition.

== Taxonomy ==
The species name was originated by the Swedish mycologist Christian Hendrik Persoon in his 1801 publication Synopsis Methodica Fungorum, as Agaricus melaleucus. This formed the basis for the genus name Melanoleuca which was invented by Narcisse Théophile Patouillard in 1897 as a variant of Melaleuca.

Patouillard had originally named the genus Melaleuca in 1887 and called the type species M. vulgaris, presumably to avoid a tautonym. In 1897 Patouillard changed the name of the genus to Melanoleuca. According to modern nomenclatural rules, the older genus name should normally take precedence, but an exception has been made by the International Botanical Congress and Melanoleuca has been declared a nomen conservandum, or a name which is to be considered valid regardless of the rules of precedence.

The American mycologist William Murrill devised the name Melanoleuca melaleuca in a 1911 article in the journal Mycologia. If that is a valid name, again following modern rules, it should take precedence over Melanoleuca vulgaris as it refers to the original species name melaleucus. In any case, Species Fungorum gives M. vulgaris as a synonym of M. polioleuca, rather than of M. melaleuca, and Bon implies that M. vulgaris is equivalent to only part of M. melaleuca.

In certain treatments of the genus, including Funga Nordica and Flora Agaricina Neerlandica, M. melaleuca is defined as having no cheilocystidia, but molecular analysis by Vizzini et al. makes it clear that these cystidia may sometimes appear and sometimes be missing in the same species of Melanoleuca, implying that this feature should not be used to characterize the mushroom. Other treatments specify M. melaleuca as having fusiform cheilocystidia, but recognize a separate taxa (considered as a synonym), M. graminicola, as having no cheilocystidia. Index Fungorum treats the latter as a separate species.

In Species Fungorum (the part of Index Fungorum which evaluates current names), apart from the valid entry of M. melaleuca, there is an invalid one designated "Melanoleuca melaleuca sensu NCL" which is said to be equivalent to the current M. polioleuca. According to Courtecuisse, M. polioleuca is distinguished by having a dense white "pruina" (a powdery covering) on the stem and by the flesh inside the stem being dark cinnamon rather than pale.

According to its definition (which is admitted to be in need of revision), Funga Nordica also lists Melanoleuca brachyspora, M. brevispora, M. robertiana and M. stridula as synonyms.

The older treatments use various characteristics to delimit the species, for instance Moser distinguishes M. melaleuca as not having a pruinose cap, with a long stem in relation to the cap diameter, having a dark brownish cap colour, with stem not coarsely striate, and having white stem flesh.

=== Etymology ===
Both the genus and species name of Melanoleuca melaleuca come from the same Ancient Greek words for black (μέλας / melas) and white (λευκόν / leukon).

== Description ==
The cap is 2–8 centimetres (3/4–3 1/4 in) wide, low convex, often with a low umbo, smooth, dark brown fading to greyish brown. The gills are whitish, crowded, and usually emarginately attached to the stipe but can be adnate to decurrent. The odor and taste are mild.

The stipe is 2–8 cm long and up to 1 cm thick, similarly coloured to the cap but lighter, with brown fibrils. The spores are 6.5–8.5 x 5–6 μm, elliptical with amyloid warts (staining blue in Melzer's reagent). The spore print is white. The cheilocystidia may be fusiform or missing.

=== Similar species ===
Due partly to the confused taxonomic definitions, this mushroom is very difficult to identify with certainty. Various authorities imply that around M. melaleuca there is a complex of closely related species without clear dividing lines, and that the current analysis (which varies from one author to another) requires more clarification. Much of the taxonomic work on Melanoleuca has been done in Europe and the status of North American specimens is less certain. However a 2012 paper by Vizzini et al. proposes updated definitions based on DNA analysis and suggests that some progress on these issues is being made.

A similar-looking species is M. angelesiana, which does not have cystidia on its gills like M. melaleuca.

== Distribution and habitat ==
It is a widely distributed species, known from Asia, Africa, Europe, North America, and Oceania. It can be found in grassy places in woods, roadsides, and heathland.

Like all Melanoleuca it is saprophytic, feeding on organic litter and not being associated with particular types of tree.

== Edibility ==
This species is reported to be edible in both Europe and North America, although information for the latter continent was unknown as late as 2006. The confusion described in the previous section does not imply any particular culinary danger because (as far as is known) the closely related species are also edible.
