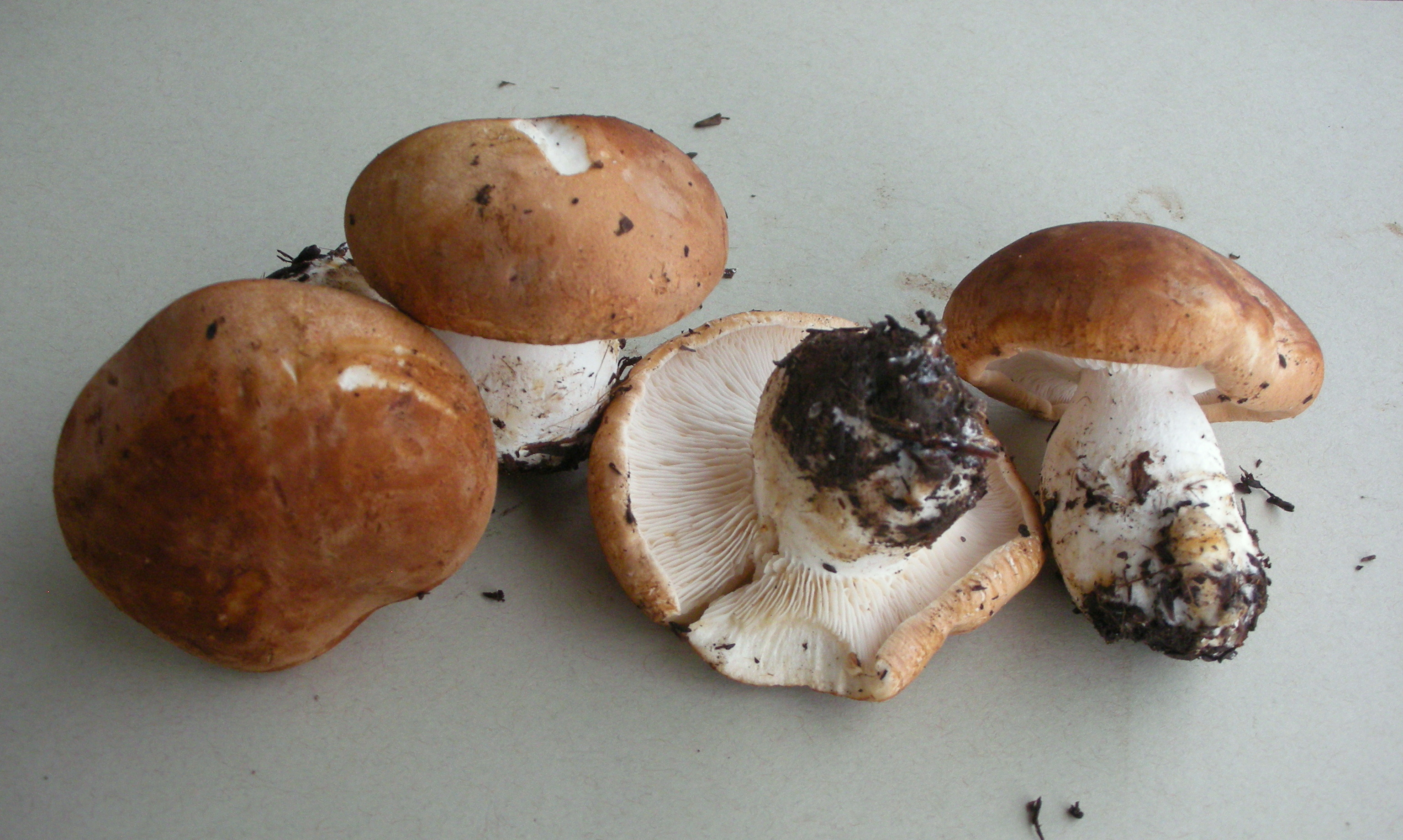

Scientific classification
- Kingdom: Fungi
- Division: Basidiomycota
- Class: Agaricomycetes
- Order: Agaricales
- Family: Tricholomataceae
- Genus: Leucopaxillus
- Species: L. gentianeus

Binomial name
- Leucopaxillus gentianeus (Quél.) Kotl. (1966)

Synonyms
- Clitocybe gentianea Quél. (1873)

= Leucopaxillus gentianeus =

Leucopaxillus gentianeus
- Mycological characteristics
- Gills on hymenium
- Cap is convex or flat
- Hymenium is adnate
- Stipe is bare
- Spore print is white
- Ecology is mycorrhizal
- Edibility is inedible

Leucopaxillus gentianeus is a bitter-tasting, inedible mushroom commonly known as the bitter false funnelcap, or the bitter brown leucopaxillus. A common synonym is Leucopaxillus amarus. The species was first described in 1873 as Clitocybe gentianea by French mycologist Lucien Quélet. František Kotlaba transferred it to Leucopaxillus in 1966.

The pileus ranges from 4–12 centimetres (1.6–4.7 in) wide and the stipe from 4–6 cm (1.6–2.4 in) long. It has a mild to pungent smell and a bitter taste, rendering it inedible. The bitter taste is caused by a triterpene called cucurbitacin B. The spore print is white.

The species can resemble L. tricolor and Russula compacta.
