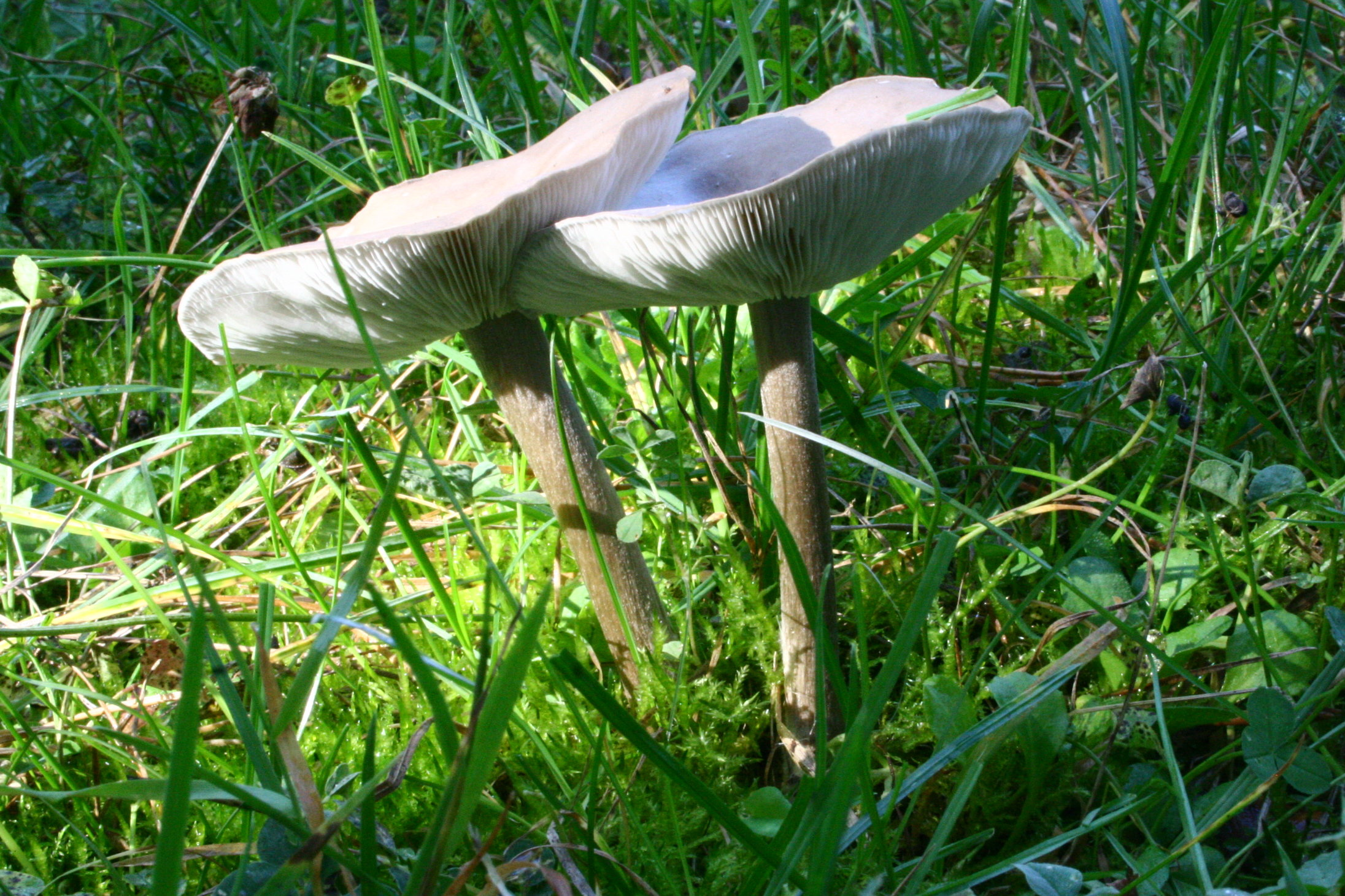
- Melanoleuca cognata

Scientific classification
- Kingdom: Fungi
- Division: Basidiomycota
- Class: Agaricomycetes
- Order: Agaricales
- Family: Tricholomataceae
- Genus: Melanoleuca; Pat. (1897)

Type species
- Melanoleuca melaleuca (Persoon) Murrill (1911)

Synonyms
- Kinia Consiglio, Contu, Setti & Vizzini (2008); Melaleuca Pat. (1887); Psammospora Fayod (1893)

= Melanoleuca =

Genus of fungi

Melanoleuca
- Mycological characteristics
- Gills on hymenium
- Cap is convex or depressed
- Hymenium is adnate or adnexed
- Stipe is bare
- Spore print is white to cream
- Ecology is saprotrophic
- Edibility is edible or unknown

Melanoleuca is a poorly known genus of saprotrophic mushrooms traditionally classified in the family Tricholomataceae. DNA studies have determined that this genus is closely related to Amanita and Pluteus and that it does not belong to the family Tricholomataceae.

Most species are small to medium sized, white, brown, ocher or gray with a cylindrical to subcylindrical stipe and white to pale yellowish gills. The basidiospores are ellipsoid and ornamented with amyloid warts. Melanoleuca is considered a difficult group to study due to their macroscopic similarities among species and the need of a thorough microscopic analysis to separate species.

== Taxonomy ==
DNA studies have confirmed Melanoleuca as monophyletic (and definitely separate from genus Leucopaxillus, which is morphologically similar and previously thought to be allied).

Other phylogenetic studies based on molecular characters have shown that Melanoleuca does not belong to the Tricholomataceae. Moncalvo et al. presented a molecular phylogeny of the Agaricales based on LSU ribosomal RNA sequence data, including sequences of M. alboflavida and M. cognata. In this phylogeny Melanoleuca was clustered with Pluteus but with low bootstrap support. Matheny et al. performed a phylogenetic analysis of the Agaricales based on six-gene regions, including sequences of M. verrucipes. In this analysis Melanoleuca, Pluteus and Volvariella were recovered as a monophyletic group and closely related with the aquatic gasteromycete Limnoperdon. These three genera together with members of the Amanitaceae and Pleurotaceae conformed the Pluteoid clade. Garnica et al. and Binder et al. recovered a similar topology with Pluteus, Volvariella and Melanoleuca as a monophyletic group. Justo et al. performed a molecular phylogeny of the family Pluteaceae and found Melanoleuca to be the sister group to a clade composed of Pluteus and Volvopluteus. This clade was poorly supported in their analysis.

=== Species ===
Murrill published the description of 119 species from North America, those species were revisited by Pfister who concluded that only six belong in Melanoleuca, while the rest belong to other genera as Clitocybe or Tricholoma. Singer considered 48 species worldwide, while Bon recognized 65 species from Europe. Kirk et al. consider about 50 species worldwide.

=== Representative species ===
- Melanoleuca abutyracea (Cleland) Grgur. – Found in Australia
- Melanoleuca alboflavida (Peck) Murrill with pileus pallid yellow brown to whitish. It is reported as edible.
- Melanoleuca brevipes (Bull.) Pat. is recognized by a short and relatively thick stipe, which looks out of proportion with the broad pileus.
- Melanoleuca cinereifolia (Bon) Bon is found in sand dunes, among Ammophila.
- Melanoleuca cognata (Fr.) Konrad & Maubl. pileus brown to ochre with gills showing a distinct ochre to pinkish color. It is reported to be edible.
- Melanoleuca communis Sánchez-García & Cifuentes is a species described from Mexico, found in coniferous or mixed forests, morphologically similar to M. polioleuca.
- Melanoleuca evenosa (Sacc.) Konrad is a species usually found in coniferous forests, and often synonymized with M. subalpina and M. strictipes, it has a whitish pileus and lageniform cystidia.
- Melanoleuca excissa (Fr.) Singer with urticoid and septate cystidia, often with crystals at the apex.
- Melanoleuca grammopodia (Bull.) Fayod has a relatively long stipe and urticoid cystidia.
- Melanoleuca melaleuca (Pers.) Murrill has been a very controversial species; some authors recognize this taxon as having cystidia, while some recognized it as not having cystidia. Fontenla et al. put end to this discussion designating a neotype with cystidia.
- Melanoleuca polioleuca (Fr.) Kühner & Maire has been incorrectly named M. melaleuca. It has fusiform to lageniform cystidia. (Note: Edible)
- Melanoleuca privernensis (consiglio, Contu, Setti & Vizzini) Consiglio, Setti & Vizzini is the only species that has inamyloid spores.
- Melanoleuca tucumanensis Singer is a species described from Tafí del Valle, Argentina
- Melanoleuca verrucipes (Fr.) Singer is easy to recognize by a blackish dotted stipe.
- Melanoleuca yucatanensis Guzman & Bon is a species described from tropical forests in Mexico, it has urticoid cystidia without apical crystals

== Etymology ==
The name of the genus is derived from the Ancient Greek melano- meaning "black", and leukos meaning "white".

== Description ==
As a genus Melanoleuca is quite distinctive, and it is not very hard to recognize a mushroom which belongs to it on sight. However the identification of its individual species is difficult due to a lack of clear macroscopic features; the delimiting characters used in descriptions and keys are such properties as the shape of cheilocystidia (if any are present), the size and ornamentation of the spores, and the structure of the pileipellis. Furthermore these characters may be very variable and overlap between taxa or depend on personal experience. Mycologists have up to now had considerable difficulty in establishing a widely accepted classification below the genus level.

One recent paper dedicated to these mushrooms describes them as "one of the less appealing fungal genera" and "mostly tedious and drab in appearance and dull in pileus colours".

=== Macroscopic characters ===
The fruit bodies of Melanoleuca are small to medium size (pileus 10–120 mm in diameter). The pileus is convex, often becoming depressed at the center, and is usually non-viscous and white, brown, ocher, or grey. The gills are adnexed, sinuate, adnate, or subdecurrent, white to yellowish. The stipe is central, cylindrical or slightly swollen at the base, dry and longitudinally striate. There is no veil. Odor and taste are usually indistinctive, mild, fungoid, sweet, or rancid. The spore print is white to pale yellowish.

=== Microscopic characters ===
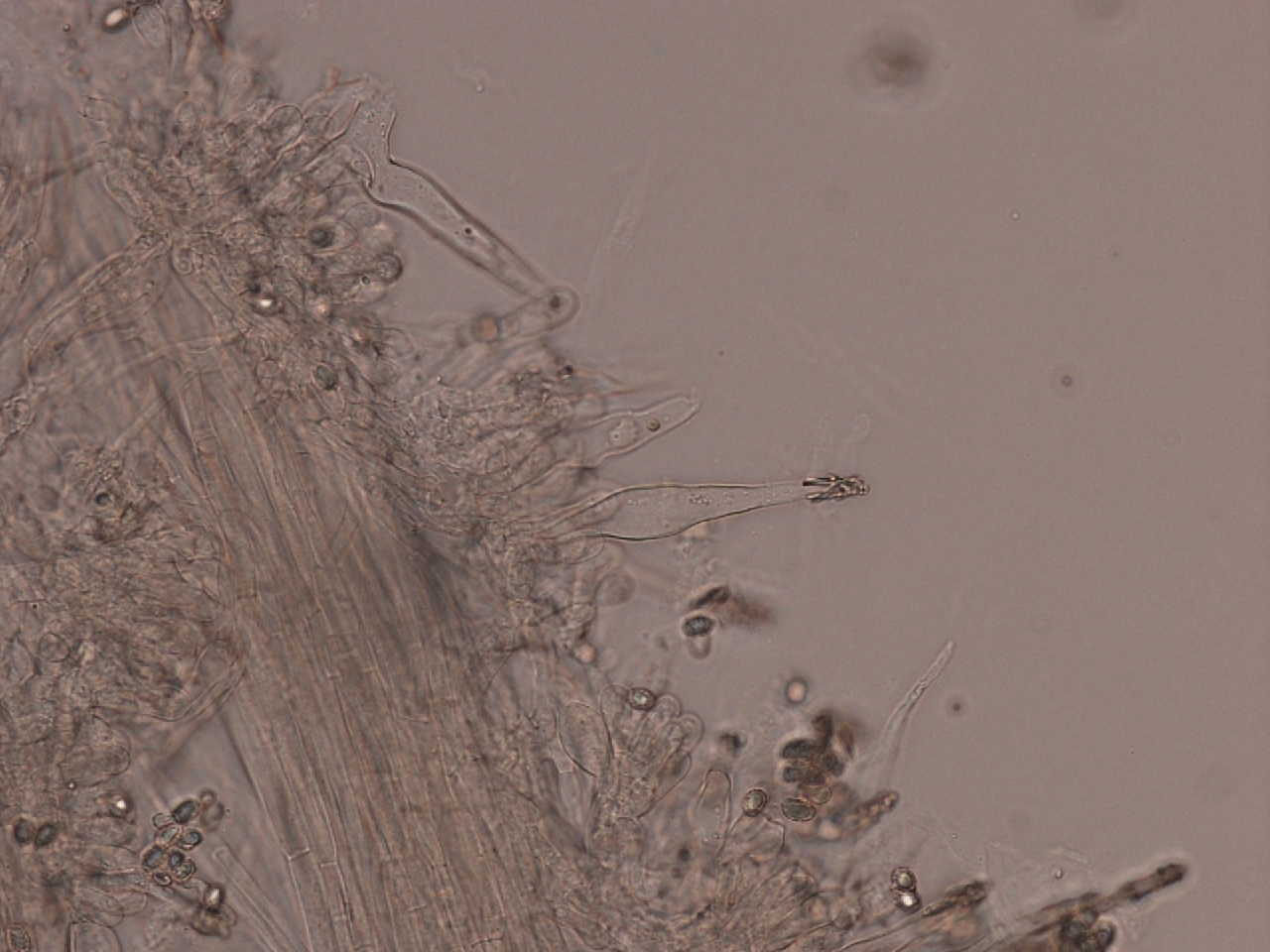
Cystidia of Melanoleuca communis

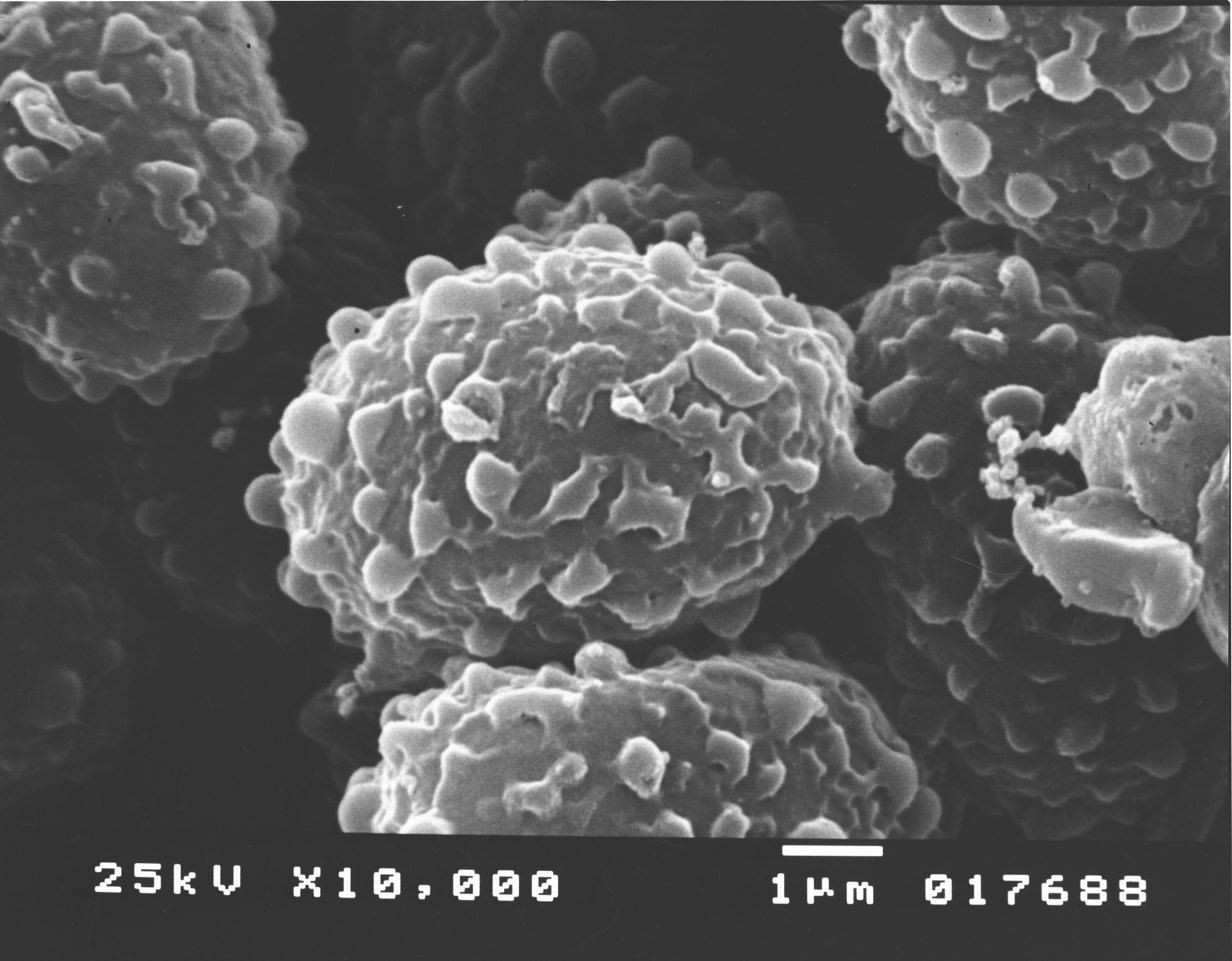
Spores of Melanoleuca in a scanning electron microscope

The spores of Melanoleuca are 7.0–11.0 x 4.0–6.0 μm, thin-walled, ellipsoid, amyloid with ornamented warts. They look very similar to the spores of Leucopaxillus, however, Melanoleuca spores present a plage. Basidia are usually 4-spored, cylindrical to clavate. Pleurocystidia and cheilocystidia may be present or absent; if present they are urticoid and thin-walled or fusiform to lageniform and thick-walled. They can have crystals incrusted at the apex. Cystidia are very important to separate species within this genus. The pileipellis is a trichoderm, sometimes a cutis. The hymenophoral trama is parallel. Clamp connections are absent in all parts of the fruit body.

== Habitat and distribution ==
Melanoleuca species are saprotrophic; growing on soil in grasslands, deciduous and evergreen forests, and sand dunes. They are cosmopolitan, but mainly distributed in temperate regions. Few species are known from the tropics.

== Edibility ==
Melanoleuca species are reported to be edible. The most common species that are consumed are M. alboflavida, M. cognata, M. evenosa, and M. melaleuca. Melanoleuca strictipes is reported to be slightly toxic.
