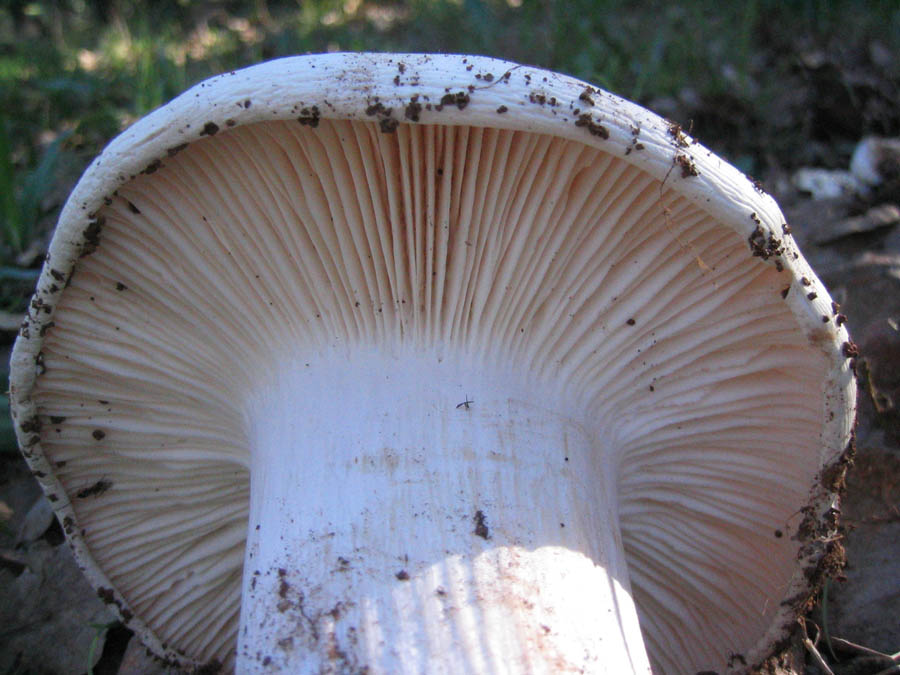
- Leucopaxillus albissimus

Scientific classification
- Domain: Eukaryota
- Kingdom: Fungi
- Division: Basidiomycota
- Class: Agaricomycetes
- Order: Agaricales
- Family: Tricholomataceae
- Genus: Leucopaxillus; Boursier

Type species
- Leucopaxillus paradoxus (Costantin & L.M.Dufour) Boursier

Species
- ~15, see text

= Leucopaxillus =

Genus of fungi

Leucopaxillus is a genus of fairly large white-spored gilled mushrooms which are found worldwide growing on the ground in woodlands. These are saprotrophs, but may sometimes be ectomycorrhizal. Less than ten species of Leucopaxillus are known to grow in North America. No species of Leucopaxillus are known to be poisonous, but they do not have an appealing taste or texture. The widespread genus contains about 15 species.

Members of Leucopaxillus are medium-sized to large, have a dry convex to depressed cap, an inrolled margin when young, lack a partial veil and have tough flesh. They have white or yellowish gills which can come off in a layer, leaving the underside of the cap smooth. The spores are white, amyloid and spiny. These mushrooms often smell bad and can be mistaken for Tricholoma and Clitocybe, but mushrooms in those genera are more fragile and rot more quickly. Members of Leucopaxillus have antibiotics which make the mushrooms persist much longer than most, making them appear to be more common than they actually are.

== Species ==
Image	Name	Taxon Author(s)	Year
	Leucopaxillus agrippinae	Buda, Consiglio, Setti & Vizzini	2012
	Leucopaxillus albissimus	(Peck) Singer	1939
	Leucopaxillus alboalutaceus	(F.H. Møller & Jul. Schäff.) F.H. Møller	1954
	Leucopaxillus baeospermus	Kühner	1954
	Leucopaxillus brasiliensis	(Rick) Singer & A.H. Sm.	1943
	Leucopaxillus brunneiflavidus	Corner	1994
	Leucopaxillus cerealis	(Lasch) Singer	1962
	Leucopaxillus compactus	(P. Karst.) Neuhoff	1958
	Leucopaxillus cutefractus	Noordel.	1984
	Leucopaxillus garinii	Bidaud	1993
	Leucopaxillus gentianeus	(Quél.) Kotl.	1966
	Leucopaxillus gracillimus	Singer & A.H. Sm.	1943
	Leucopaxillus gratus	Corner	1994
	Leucopaxillus guernisacii	(P. Crouan & H. Crouan) Bon	1978
	Leucopaxillus laterarius	(Peck) Singer & A.H. Sm.	1943
	Leucopaxillus lentus	(H. Post) Singer	1943
	Leucopaxillus lilacinus	Bougher	1987
	Leucopaxillus malayanus	Corner	1994
	Leucopaxillus malenconii	Bon	1990
	Leucopaxillus masakanus	Pegler	1977
	Leucopaxillus monticola	(Singer & A.H. Sm.) Bon	1990
	Leucopaxillus nauseosodulcis	(P. Karst.) Singer & A.H. Sm.	1943
	Leucopaxillus otagoensis	G. Stev.	1964
	Leucopaxillus paradoxus	(Costantin & L.M. Dufour) Boursier	1925
	Leucopaxillus patagonicus	Singer	1954
	Leucopaxillus peronatus	Corner	1994
	Leucopaxillus phaeopus	(J. Favre & Poluzzi) Bon	1987
	Leucopaxillus piceinus	(Peck) Pomerl.	1980
	Leucopaxillus pinicola	J. Favre	1960
	Leucopaxillus pseudoacerbus	(Costantin & L.M. Dufour) Boursier	1925
	Leucopaxillus pseudogambosus	Pilát	1966
	Leucopaxillus pulcherrimus	(Peck) Singer & A.H. Sm.	1943
	Leucopaxillus rickii	Singer	1954
	Leucopaxillus stenosporus	A. Favre	2007
	Leucopaxillus subcerasus	Corner	1994
	Leucopaxillus tricolor	(Peck) Kühner	1926
	Leucopaxillus vulpeculus	(Kalchbr.) Bon	1978

== See also ==
- List of Tricholomataceae genera
