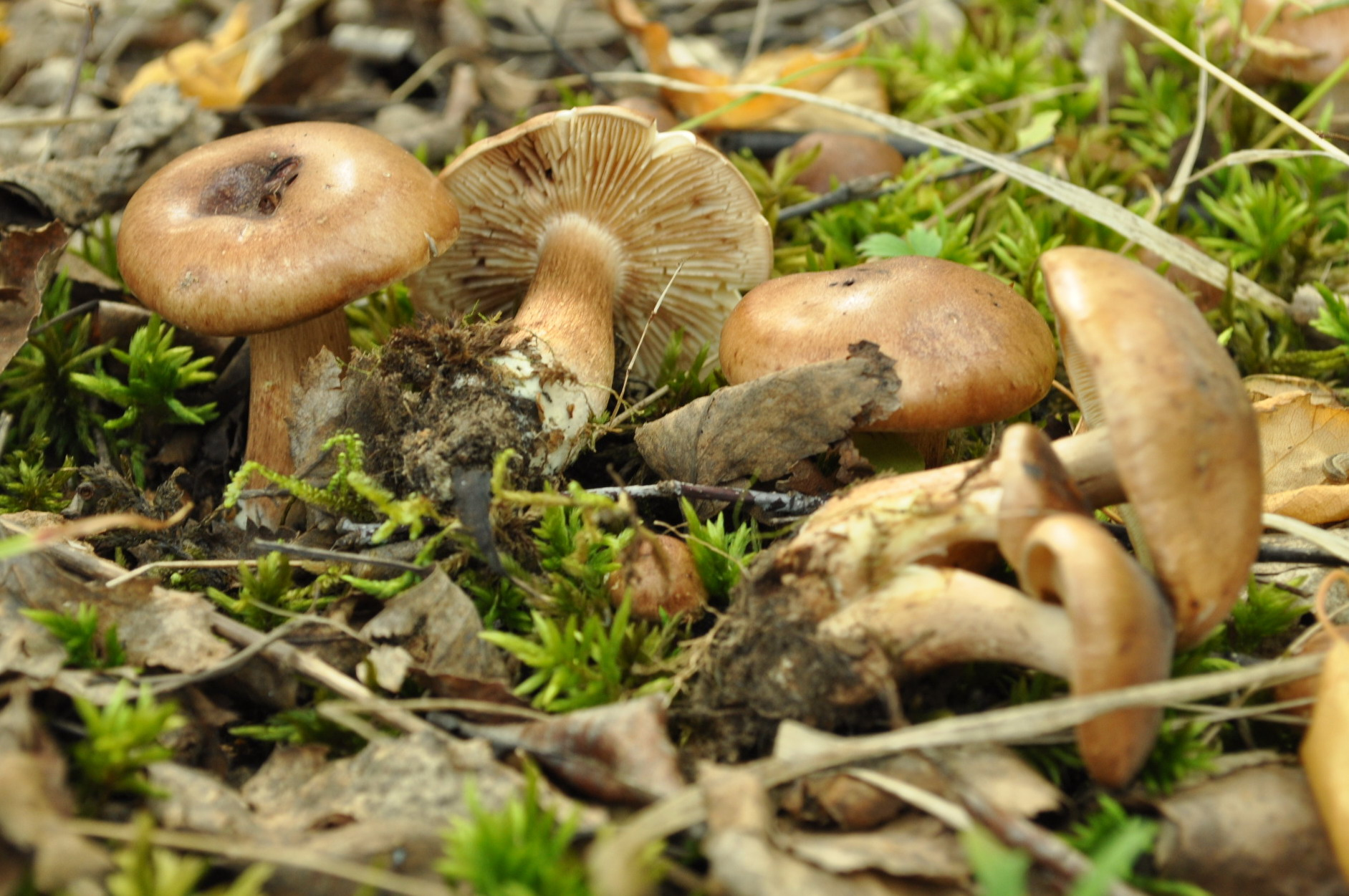

Scientific classification
- Domain: Eukaryota
- Kingdom: Fungi
- Division: Basidiomycota
- Class: Agaricomycetes
- Order: Agaricales
- Family: Tricholomataceae
- Genus: Tricholoma
- Species: T. populinum

Binomial name
- Tricholoma populinum J.E.Lange (1933)

= Tricholoma populinum =

Species of fungus

Tricholoma populinum Mycological characteristics
- Gills on hymenium
- Cap is convex
- Hymenium is adnexed
- Stipe is bare
- Spore print is white
- Ecology is mycorrhizal
- Edibility is edible

Tricholoma populinum, commonly known as the poplar tricholoma, sandy, or cottonwood mushroom, is a mushroom of the agaric genus Tricholoma.

== Taxonomy ==
It was formally described by Danish mycologist Jakob Emanuel Lange in 1933.

== Description ==
The tannish cap is up to 16 centimetres (6 1/4 in) wide. It can have radial streaks and a lighter margin. The stem is up to 7.5 cm (3 in) long.

=== Similar species ===
The species can resemble the poisonous T. pessundatum, but can be distinguished by it association with cottonwood.

== Distribution and habitat ==
It is common in western North America, growing with cottonwood and poplars near rivers and in sandy soil.

== Uses ==
It is edible and traditionally eaten by the Salish peoples in British Columbia.

== See also ==
- List of North American Tricholoma
- List of Tricholoma species
