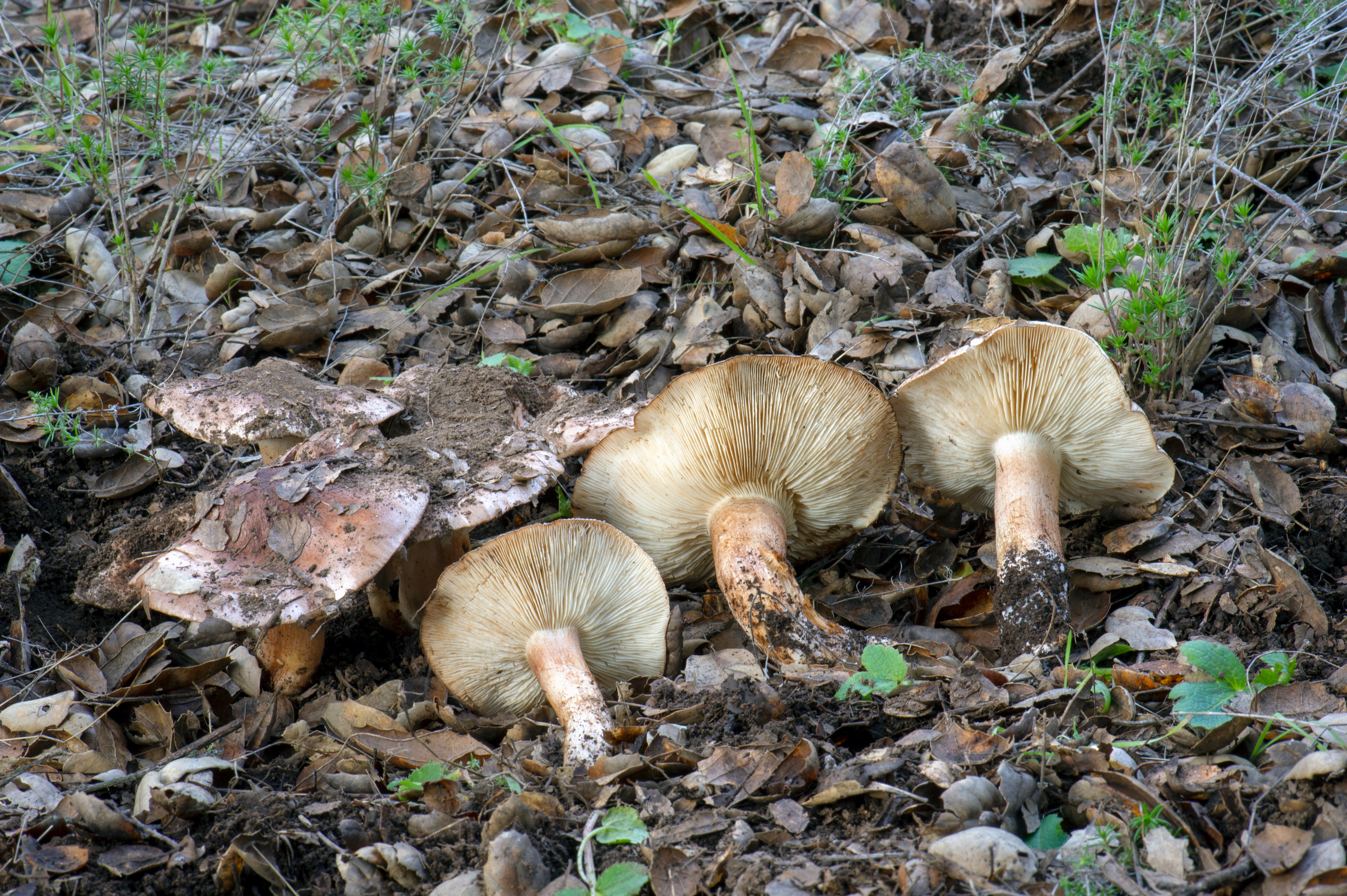

Scientific classification
- Kingdom: Fungi
- Division: Basidiomycota
- Class: Agaricomycetes
- Order: Agaricales
- Family: Tricholomataceae
- Genus: Tricholoma
- Species: T. dryophilum

Binomial name
- Tricholoma dryophilum (Murrill) Murrill (1913)

Synonyms
- Melanoleuca dryophila Murrill (1913)

= Tricholoma dryophilum =

Species of fungus

Tricholoma dryophilum is a mushroom of the agaric genus Tricholoma. First described as a member of the genus Melanoleuca by William Alphonso Murrill in 1913, he transferred it to Tricholoma later that year.

The cap is up to 14 centimetres (5 1/2 in) wide. It grows on the North American West Coast under oak trees. It is toxic.

== See also ==
- List of North American Tricholoma
