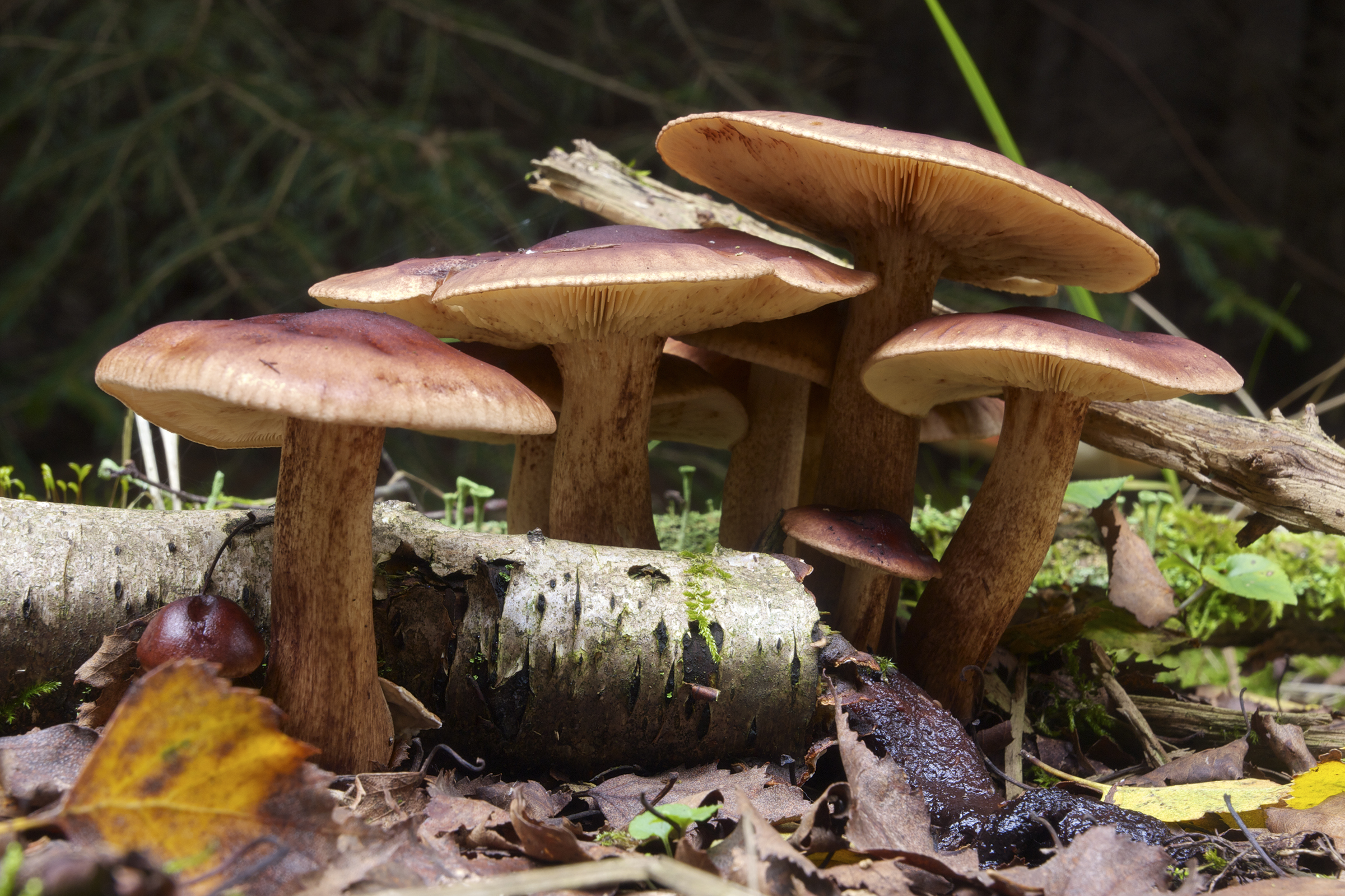

Scientific classification
- Kingdom: Fungi
- Division: Basidiomycota
- Class: Agaricomycetes
- Order: Agaricales
- Family: Tricholomataceae
- Genus: Tricholoma
- Species: T. fulvum

Binomial name
- Tricholoma fulvum (Fr.) Bigeard & H.Guill. (1909)

Synonyms
- Agaricus fulvus Bull. (1792); Gyrophila fulva (Fr.) Quél. (1886)

= Tricholoma fulvum =

Species of fungus

Tricholoma fulvum is a mushroom of the agaric genus Tricholoma. One guide reports that the species is inedible, while another says the fruit bodies are edible. Another says that it is likely poisonous.

It is a pale brown to reddish-brown mushroom with crimped hat edges. Gills are yellowy-white and get brown spots. The spore powder is white. The stem brown externally, and hollow and yellow internally. It grows mycorrhizally with birch-trees.

== See also ==
Tricholoma fulvum
- Mycological characteristics
- Gills on hymenium
- Cap is convex or umbonate
- Hymenium is adnexed or sinuate
- Stipe is bare
- Spore print is white
- Edibility is not recommended

- List of North American Tricholoma
- List of Tricholoma species
