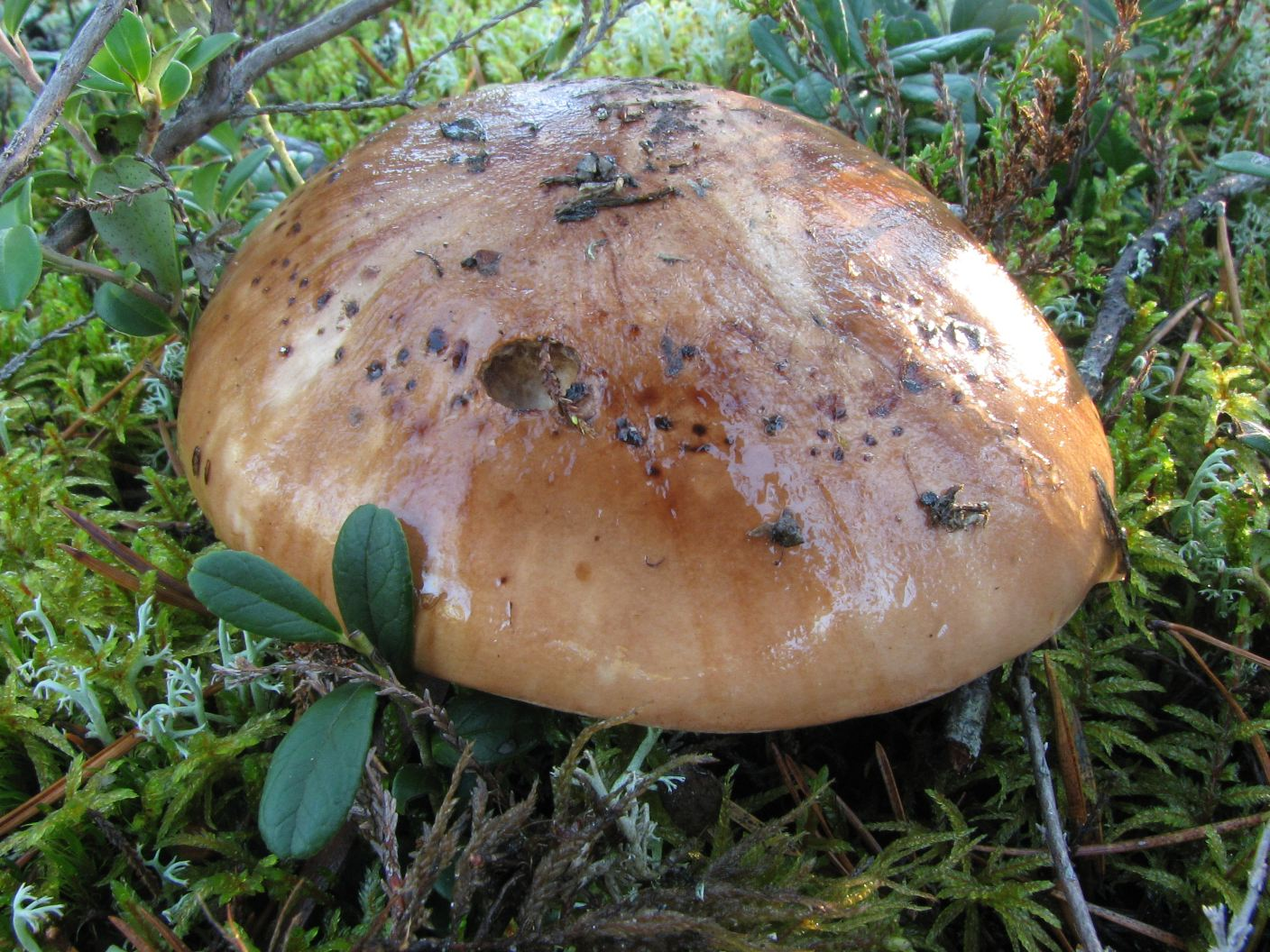

Scientific classification
- Kingdom: Fungi
- Division: Basidiomycota
- Class: Agaricomycetes
- Order: Agaricales
- Family: Tricholomataceae
- Genus: Tricholoma
- Species: T. pessundatum

Binomial name
- Tricholoma pessundatum (Fr.) Quél. (1872)

Synonyms
- Agaricus pessundatus Fr. (1821); Gyrophila equestris var. pessundata (Fr.) Quél. (1886); Gyrophila pessundata (Fr.) Quél. (1888)

= Tricholoma pessundatum =

Species of fungus

Tricholoma pessundatum is a mushroom of the agaric genus Tricholoma.

== Taxonomy ==
First described as Agaricus pessundatus by Elias Magnus Fries in 1821, it was transferred to the genus Tricholoma by Lucien Quélet in 1872.

== Description ==
The orangish cap is up to 18 centimetres (7 in) across, with a lighter margin, and is viscid when wet. The gills are white but develop stains and vary in attachment. The stem is up to 14 cm (5 1/2 in) long. The spore print is white.

It has a sour meal odor.

=== Similar species ===
A very similar species to the European mushroom is Tricholoma muricatum, which differs only in microscopic details.

== Toxicity ==
It contains toxins which can cause severe gastrointestinal upset.

== See also ==
- List of North American Tricholoma
- List of Tricholoma species
