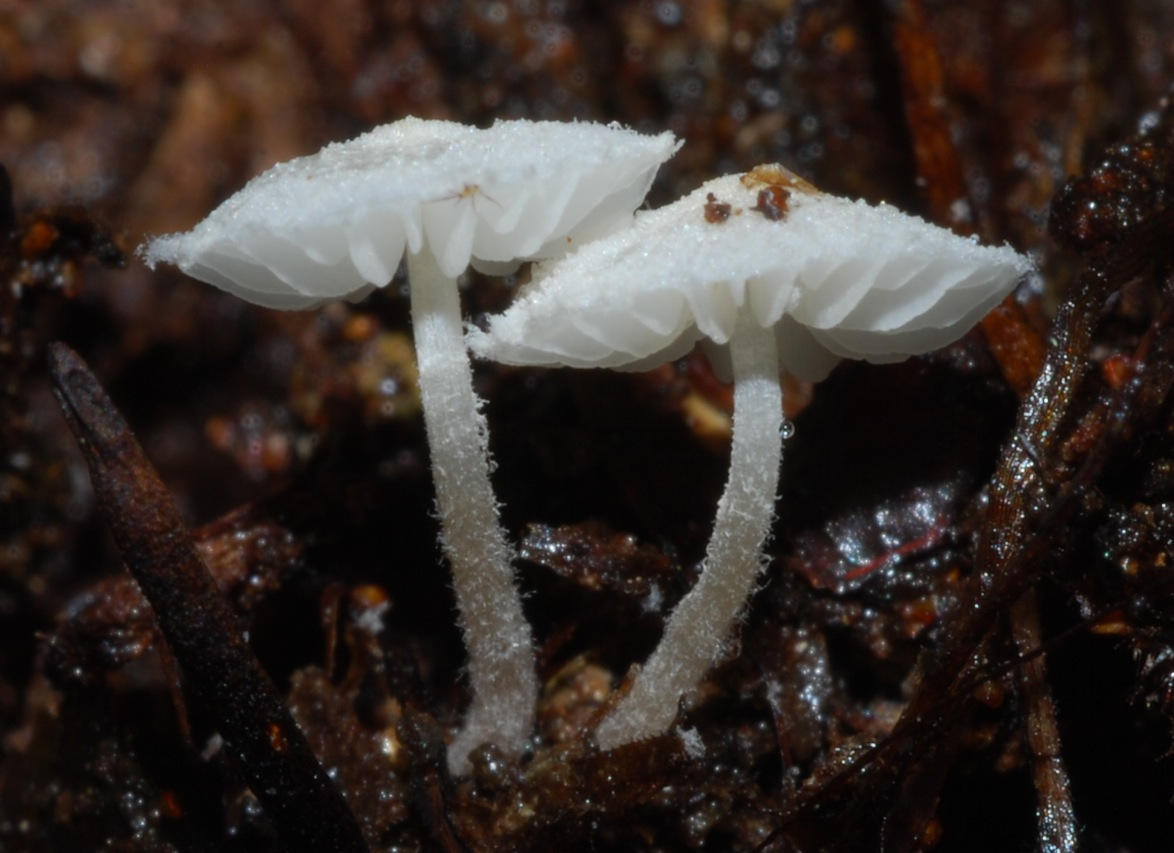
- Amparoina spinosissima

Scientific classification
- Kingdom: Fungi
- Division: Basidiomycota
- Class: Agaricomycetes
- Order: Agaricales
- Family: Tricholomataceae
- Genus: Amparoina; Singer

Type species
- Amparoina spinosissima (Singer) Singer

Species
- A. heteracantha A. spinosissima

= Amparoina =

Genus of fungi

Amparoina is a genus of fungi in the family Tricholomataceae. The genus contains two species found in South America.

== See also ==
- List of Tricholomataceae genera
