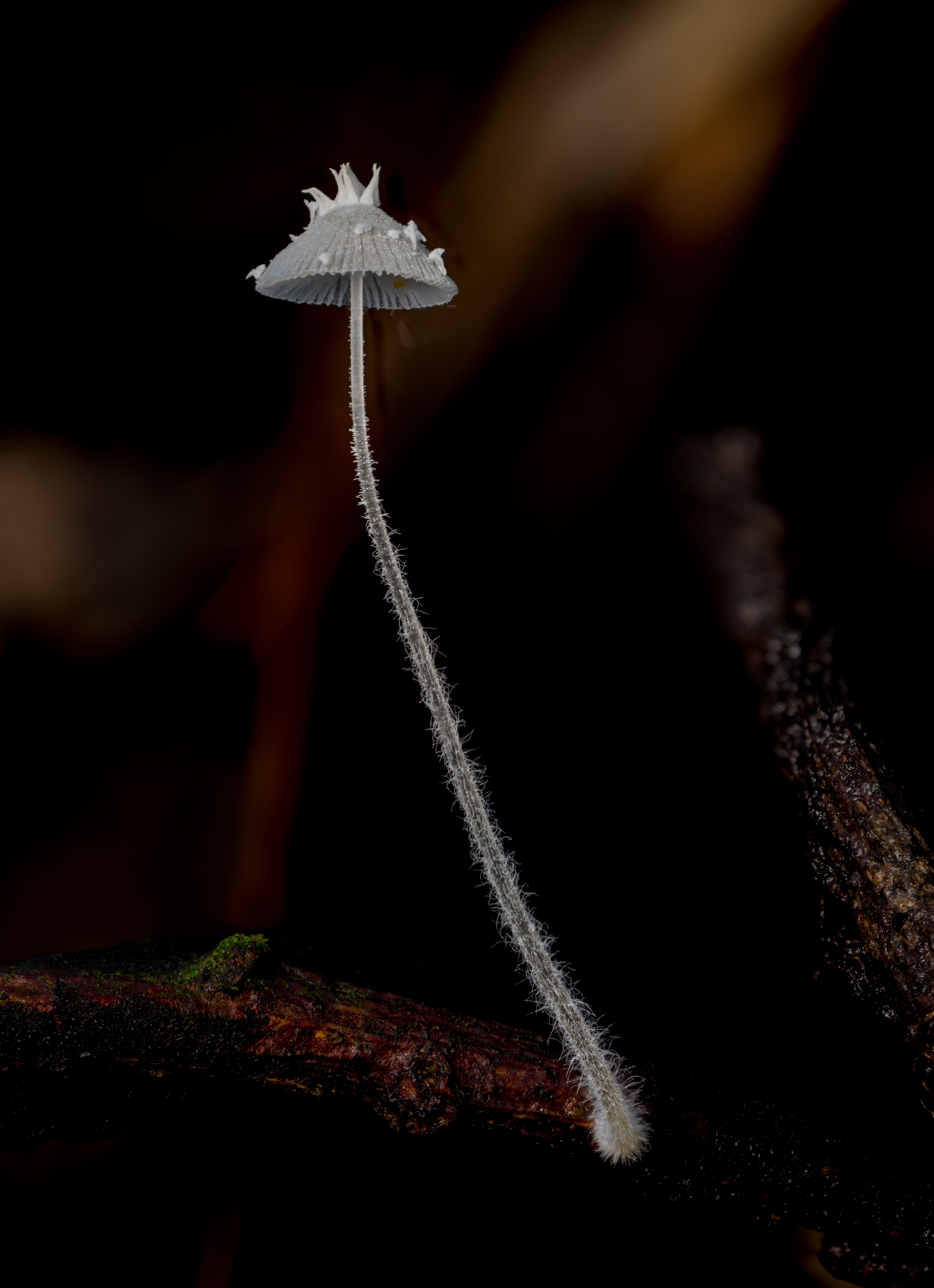
- Amparoina spinosissima (putative identification)

Scientific classification
- Kingdom: Fungi
- Division: Basidiomycota
- Class: Agaricomycetes
- Order: Agaricales
- Family: Tricholomataceae
- Genus: Amparoina
- Species: A. spinosissima

Binomial name
- Amparoina spinosissima (Singer) Singer

Synonyms
- 1951 Marasmius spinosissimus Singer; 1995 Mycena spinosissima (Singer) Desjardin

= Amparoina spinosissima =

Species of fungus

Amparoina spinosissima is a species of fungus in the family Tricholomataceae, and the type species of the genus Amparoina. It was originally named Mycena spinosissima by mycologist Rolf Singer in 1951, who had originally found the species in Argentina in 1949. He transferred it to Amparoina in 1958.

== Distribution ==
The fungus is found in tropical and subtropical regions, and has been collected in Argentina, Colombia, Japan, the Hawaiian Islands, New Caledonia, Costa Rica, and Puerto Rico.
