= L. densifolia =

L. densifolia may refer to:

- Lithomyrtus densifolia, an Oceanian myrtle
- Lulesia densifolia, a tropical fungus
