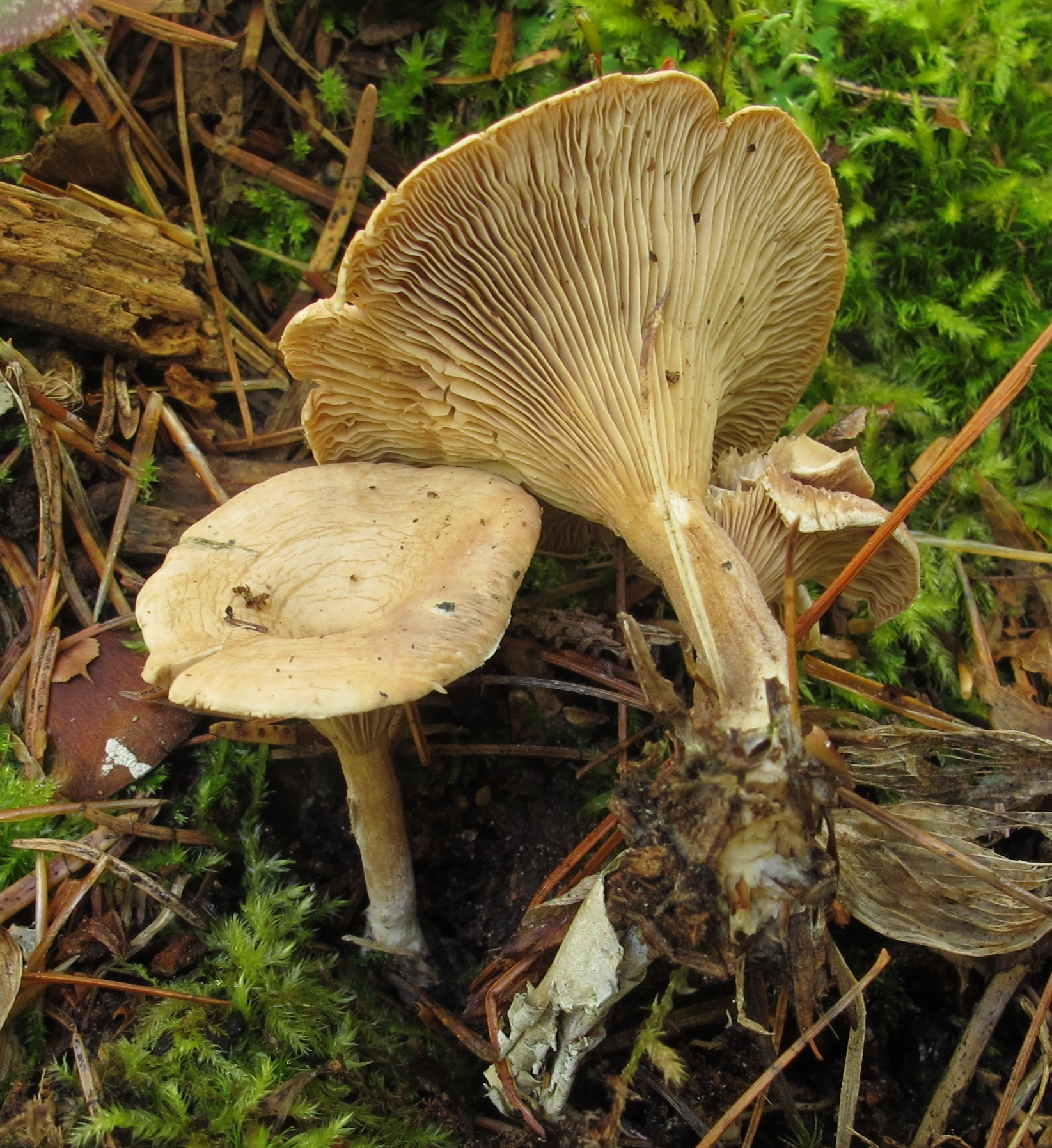
- Lulesia popinalis

Scientific classification
- Domain: Eukaryota
- Kingdom: Fungi
- Division: Basidiomycota
- Class: Agaricomycetes
- Order: Agaricales
- Family: Tricholomataceae
- Genus: Lulesia; Singer

Type species
- Lulesia densifolia Singer

= Lulesia =

Genus of fungi

Lulesia is a genus of fungi in the family Tricholomataceae. The genus contains several species found in tropical regions.

== Species ==
The following species are recognised in the genus Lulesia:

- Lulesia alachuana (Murrill) Singer (1970)
- Lulesia colorata (L. Fan & N. Mao) T.J. Baroni, N. Niveiro & B.E. Lechner (2023)
- Lulesia densifolia (Singer) Singer (1970)
- Lulesia fallax (Quél.) T.J. Baroni, N. Niveiro & B.E. Lechner (2023)
- Lulesia lignicola B.E. Lechner & J.E. Wright (2006)
- Lulesia mundula (Lasch) T.J. Baroni, N. Niveiro & B.E. Lechner (2023)
- Lulesia obscura (Pilát) T.J. Baroni, B.E. Lechner & N. Niveiro (2023)
- Lulesia popinalis (Fr.) T.J. Baroni, B.E. Lechner & N. Niveiro (2023)
- Lulesia semiarboricola (T.J. Baroni) T.J. Baroni, B.E. Lechner & N. Niveiro (2023)
- Lulesia termitophila (T.J. Baroni & Angelini) T.J. Baroni & Angelini (2023)
