= Lulesia densifolia =

Scientific classification
- Domain: Eukaryota
- Kingdom: Fungi
- Division: Basidiomycota
- Class: Agaricomycetes
- Order: Agaricales
- Family: Tricholomataceae
- Genus: Lulesia
- Species: L. densifolia

Binomial name
- Lulesia densifolia Singer (1970)

Species of fungus

Lulesia densifolia is a species of fungus that was first described by Rolf Singer in 1970. It is the type species of the genus Lulesia. As with the other two species in this genus, L. densifolia is found in the tropics.
