= List of Hygrocybe species =

This is an inexhaustive list of species in the genus Hygrocybe. The genus has a widespread distribution and contains about 150 species.

== Subgenus Hygrocybe ==
=== Section Chlorophanae ===
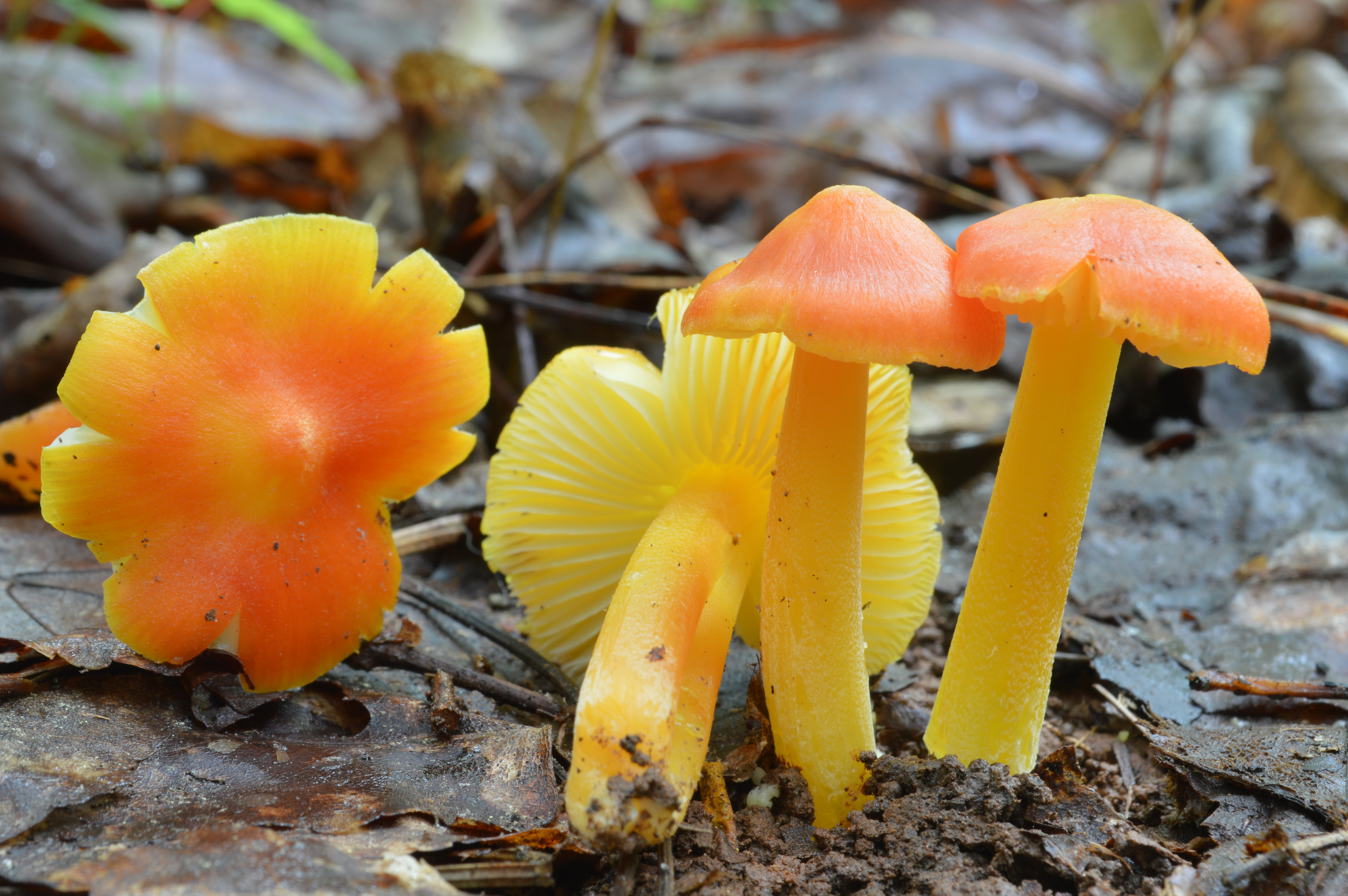
H. flavescens

- Hygrocybe chimaeroderma - (Caribbean)
- Hygrocybe chlorophana - golden waxcap (Europe, North America, northern Asia)
- Hygrocybe flavescens - (North America)
- Hygrocybe glutinipes - glutinous waxcap (Europe)

=== Section Hygrocybe ===
Subsection Hygrocybe

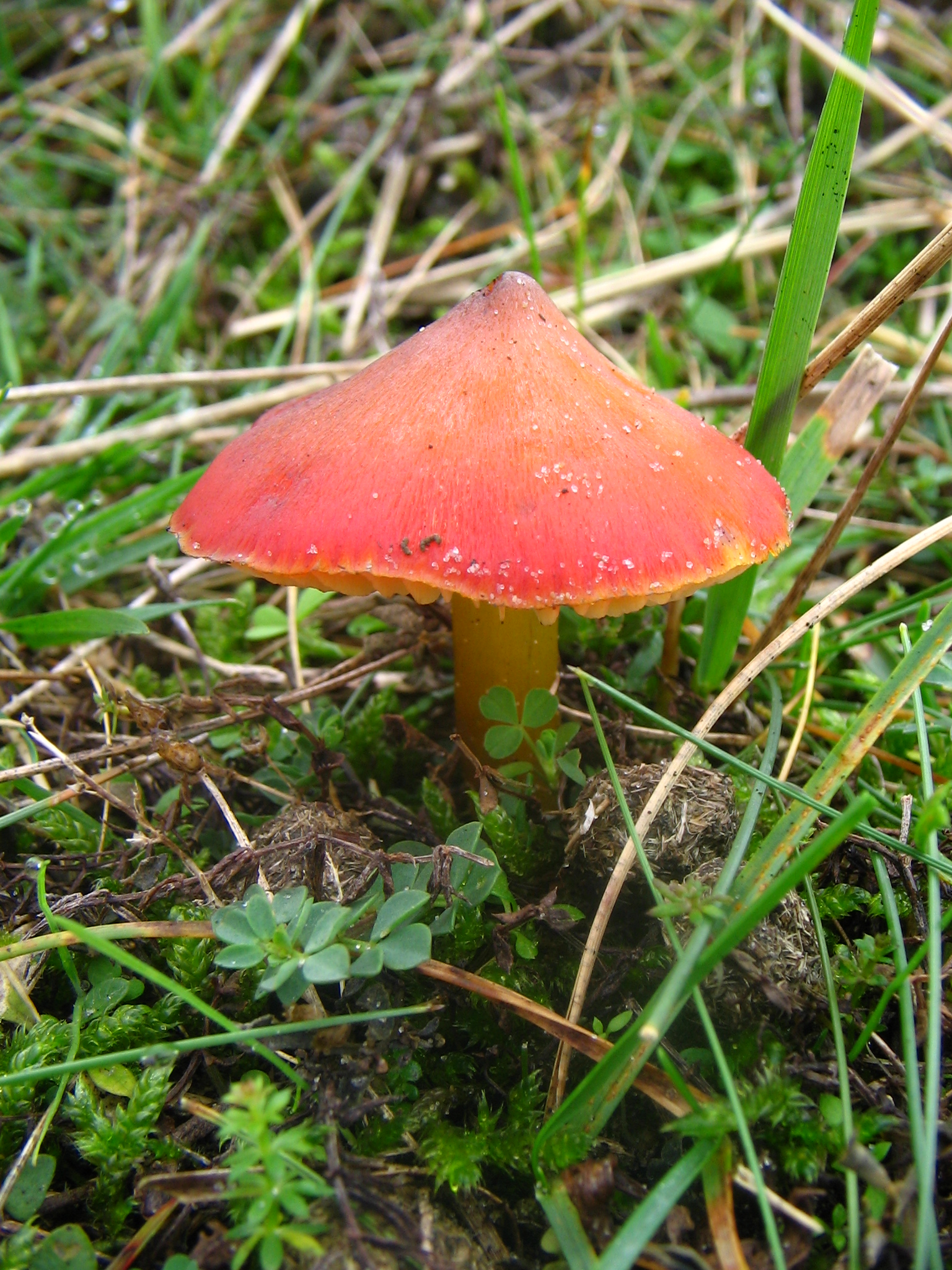
H. conica

- Hygrocybe astatogala - (Australia, Madagascar, Central Africa, Philippines)
- Hygrocybe atrosquamosa - (Caribbean, South America, India)
- Hygrocybe conica - blackening waxcap or witch's hat (Europe, North America, Australia)
- Hygrocybe conicoides - dune waxcap (Europe)
- Hygrocybe cuspidata - candy apple waxcap (North America)
- Hygrocybe debilipes - (China)
- Hygrocybe griseonigricans - (China)
- Hygrocybe luteistipes - (Costa Rica, Caribbean)
- Hygrocybe nigrescens - blackening waxcap (Europe, Africa)
- Hygrocybe olivaceonigra - (Europe, North America)
- Hygrocybe parabolica - (Dominican Republic)
- Hygrocybe riparia - (Europe)
- Hygrocybe rubroconica - (China)
- Hygrocybe santagouana - (China)
- Hygrocybe singeri - western witch's hat (North America)
- Hygrocybe xerophila - (North America)

Subsection Macrosporae

- Hygrocybe acutoconica - persistent waxcap (Europe, North America, Australia)
- Hygrocybe llistosellae - (Balearic Islands)
- Hygrocybe perdomoi - (North America)
- Hygrocybe spadicea - date waxcap (Europe)
- Hygrocybe striatolutea - (New Zealand)
- Hygrocybe zuluensis - (South Africa)

=== Section Microsporae ===
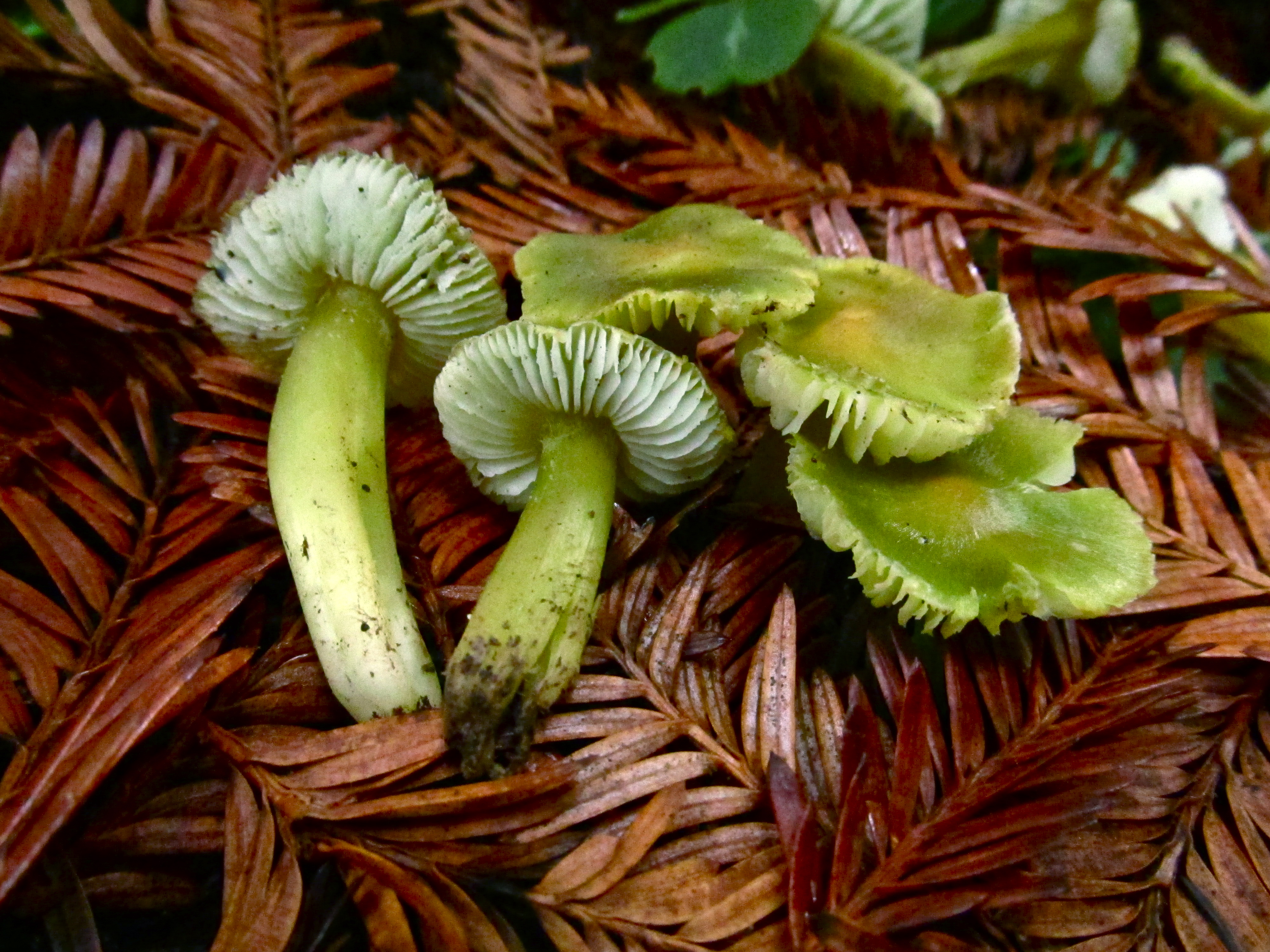
H. virescens

- Hygrocybe citrinovirens - citrine waxcap (Europe)
- Hygrocybe intermedia - fibrous waxcap (Europe)
- Hygrocybe virescens - lime-green waxy cap (North America)

=== Section Pseudofirmae ===
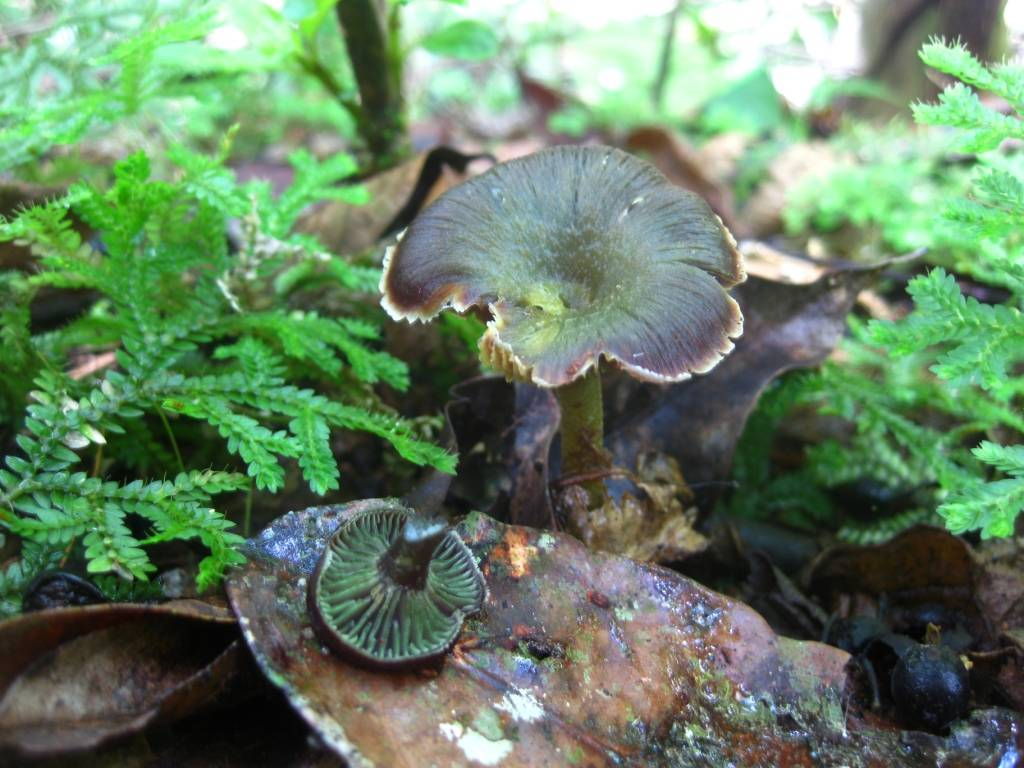
H. prieta

- Hygrocybe amazoniensis - (Brazil)
- Hygrocybe appalachianensis - Appalachian waxy cap (eastern United States)
- Hygrocybe campinaranae - (Brazil)
- Hygrocybe chloochlora - (Puerto Rico)
- Hygrocybe cristalinoensis - (Brazil)
- Hygrocybe jarabacoensis - (Dominican Republic)
- Hygrocybe megistospora - (Brazil)
- Hygrocybe mirabilis - (Belize)
- Hygrocybe naranjana - (Colombia)
- Hygrocybe neofirma - (Puerto Rico, Guadeloupe)
- Hygrocybe occidentalis - (Puerto Rico, Colombia)
- Hygrocybe pegleri - (Brazil)
- Hygrocybe prieta - (Puerto Rico)
- Hygrocybe rosea - (South America)
- Hygrocybe trinitensis - (Puerto Rico)
- Hygrocybe vinaceosquamulosa - (Brazil)
- Hygrocybe viridilacerata - (Brazil)

=== Section Velosae ===
- Hygrocybe hypohaemacta - (Jamaica, U.S. Virgin Islands)
- Hygrocybe pseudohypohaemacta - (Belize, French Guiana, Dominican Republic)
- Hygrocybe roseopallida - (Central America)
- Hygrocybe variecolor - (Dominican Republic)

=== Incertae sedis within subgenus Hygrocybe ===
- Hygrocybe helobia - garlic waxcap (Europe)

== Subgenus Pseudohygrocybe ==
=== Section Coccineae ===
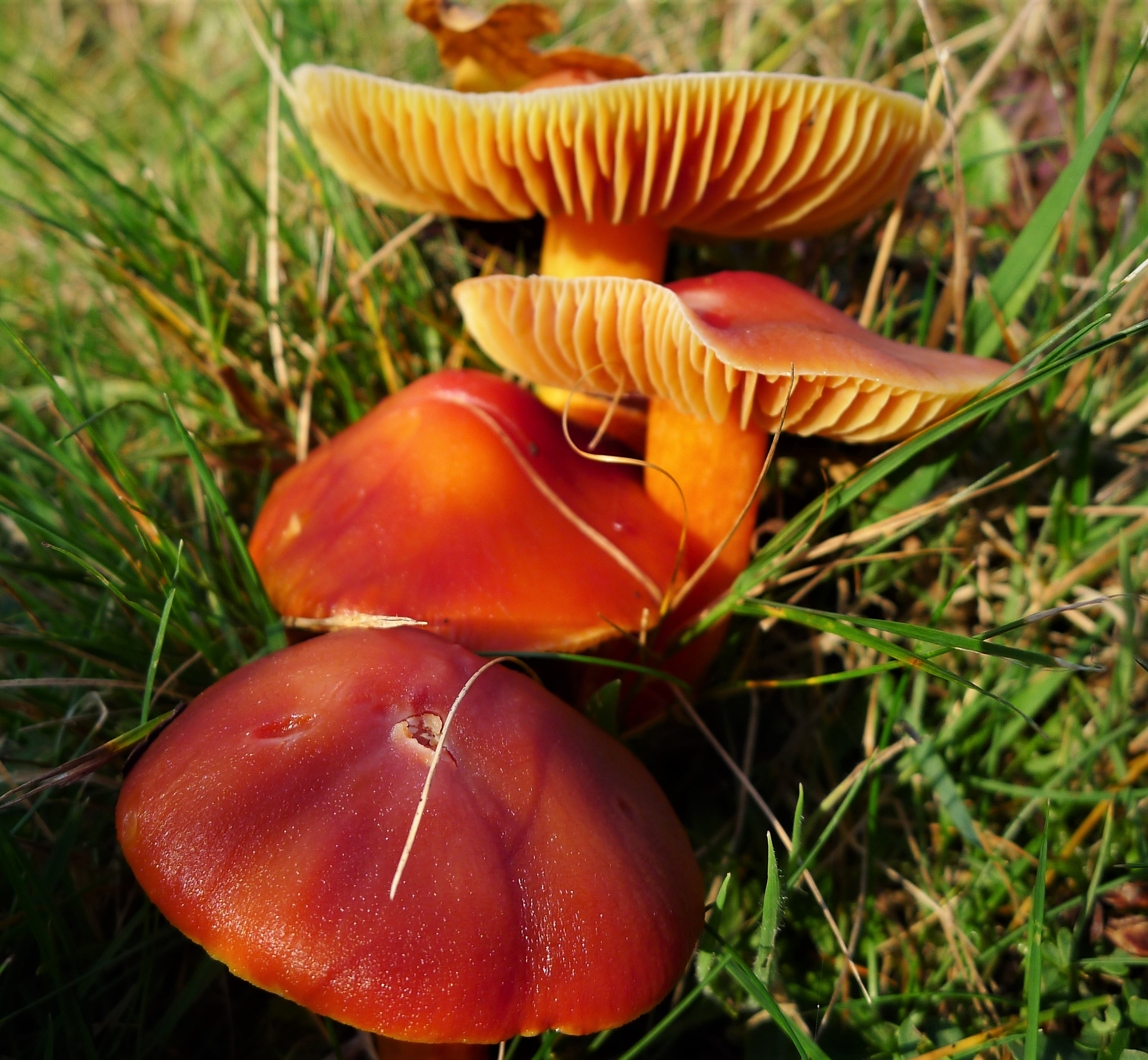
H. punicea

Subsection Coccineae

- Hygrocybe aurantiosplendens - orange waxcap (Europe, North America)
- Hygrocybe coccinea - scarlet waxcap or scarlet hood (Europe, North America, Australia)
- Hygrocybe punicea - crimson waxcap (Europe, North America?)
- Hygrocybe purpureofolia - purple-gilled waxcap (North America)
- Hygrocybe sanguineolutea - (Europe)

Subsection Siccae

- Hygrocybe julietae - (New Zealand)
- Hygrocybe reidii - honey waxcap (Europe, North America?)

Subsection Squamulosae

- Hygrocybe caespitosa - clustered waxcap (eastern North America)
- Hygrocybe cantharellus - chanterelle waxcap (North America)
- Hygrocybe coccineocrenata - bog waxcap (Europe)
- Hygrocybe melleofusca - (North America)
- Hygrocybe monscaiensis - (Spain)
- Hygrocybe squamosissima - (Southern Europe)
- Hygrocybe substrangulata - waisted waxcap (Europe)
- Hygrocybe turunda - singed waxcap or craberry waxcap (Europe)
- Hygrocybe umbilicata - (Bangladesh)

Incertae sedis within section Coccineae

- Hygrocybe alpina - (Europe)
- Hygrocybe amara - (Europe)
- Hygrocybe aurantiocitrina - (Europe)
- Hygrocybe aurisquama - (China)
- Hygrocybe ceracea - butter waxcap (Europe)
- Hygrocybe constrictospora - hourglass waxcap (Europe)
- Hygrocybe garajonayensis - (Canary Islands)
- Hygrocybe insipida - spangle waxcap (Europe)
- Hygrocybe madeirensis - (Madeira)
- Hygrocybe mucronella - bitter waxcap (Europe)
- Hygrocybe parvula - (North America)
- Hygrocybe quieta - oily waxcap (Europe)
- Hygrocybe salicis-herbaceae - mountain waxcap (Europe)
- Hygrocybe splendidissima - splendid waxcap (Europe)
- Hygrocybe viridiphylla - (North America, South America)
- Hygrocybe vulcanica - (Portugal)

=== Section Firmae ===
- Hygrocybe aurantiomagnifica - (Brazil)
- Hygrocybe batistae - (Puerto Rico)
- Hygrocybe boothii - (Australia)
- Hygrocybe firma - (Australia, New Zealand, Asia)
- Hygrocybe macrosiparia - (Ecuador)
- Hygrocybe martinicensis - (Martinique, Brazil)
- Hygrocybe miniatofirma - (Puerto Rico)
- Hygrocybe rubroalba - (Brazil)
- Hygrocybe rubrocarnosa - (New Zealand)

=== Incertae sedis within subgenus Pseudohygrocybe ===
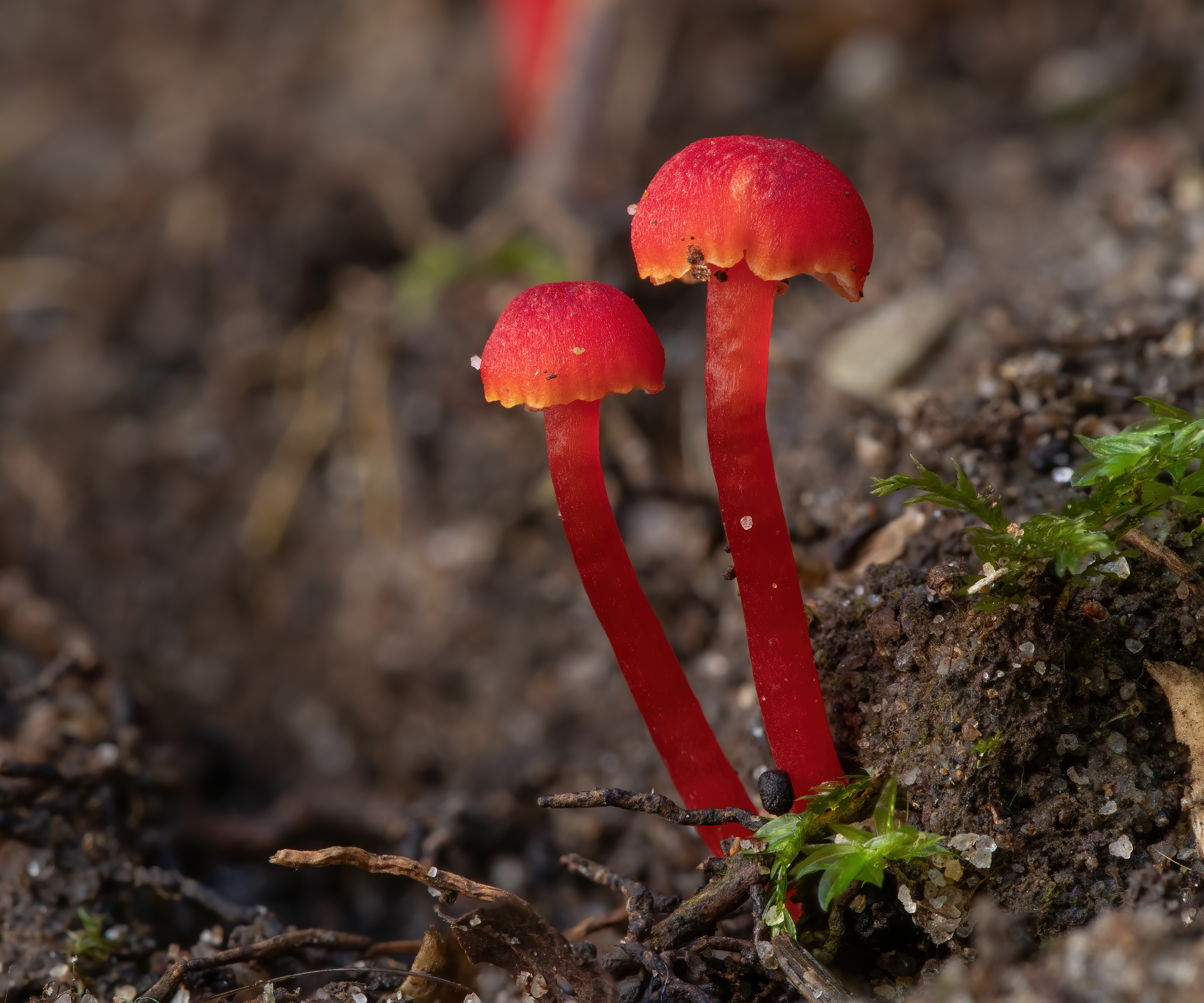
H. miniata

- Hygrocybe andersonii - gulfshore waxcap (southeast United States)
- Hygrocybe calciphila - limestone waxcap (Europe)
- Hygrocybe cortinarioides - (China)
- Hygrocybe fuscoaurantiaca - (New Zealand)
- Hygrocybe keithgeorgei - (New Zealand)
- Hygrocybe lilaceolamellata - (Australia, New Zealand)
- Hygrocybe miniata - vermilion waxcap or miniature waxcap (Europe)
- Hygrocybe phaeococcinea - shadowed waxcap (Europe)
- Hygrocybe sinorubra - (China)

== Not assigned to a subgenus ==
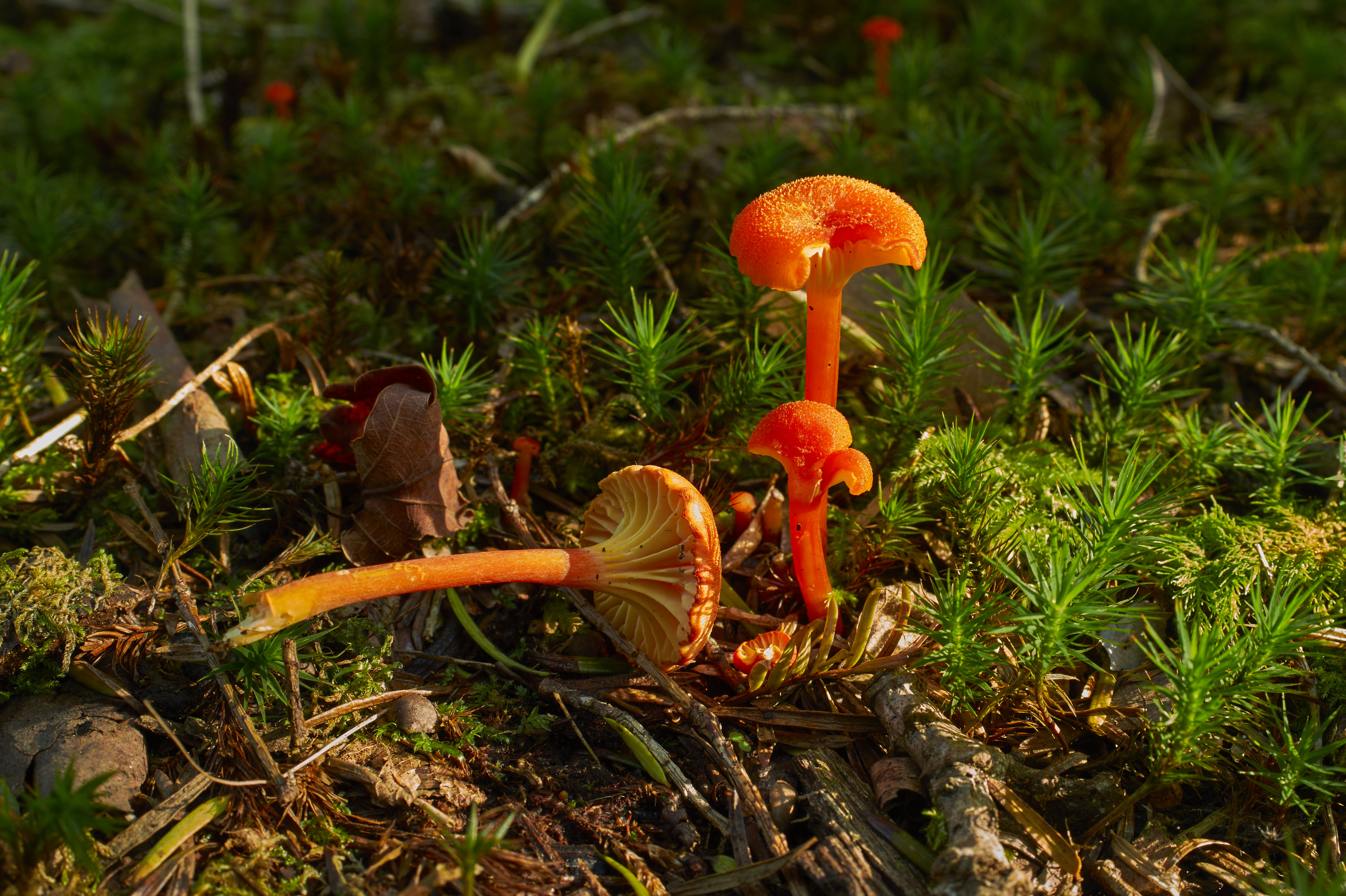
H. lepida

- Hygrocybe albomarginata - (Puerto Rico)
- Hygrocybe americana - (Western North America)
- Hygrocybe anisa - (Sri Lanka, India)
- Hygrocybe anomala - (Australia)
- Hygrocybe aphylla - (Ecuador)
- Hygrocybe atro-olivacea - (Europe, North America)
- Hygrocybe aurantiorufa - (South Africa)
- Hygrocybe aurantipes - (Australia)
- Hygrocybe austrolutea - (Australia)
- Hygrocybe austropratensis - (Australia)
- Hygrocybe batesii - (Australia)
- Hygrocybe blanda - (New Zealand)
- Hygrocybe bolensis - (Australia)
- Hygrocybe brunnea - (New Zealand)
- Hygrocybe brunneosquamosa - (Puerto Rico)
- Hygrocybe californica - (North America)
- Hygrocybe cavipes - (New Zealand)
- Hygrocybe cerasinomutata - (Australia)
- Hygrocybe cerinolutea - (New Zealand)
- Hygrocybe chamaeleon - chamaeleon waxcap (North America)
- Hygrocybe cinereofirma - (Puerto Rico)
- Hygrocybe collucera - (Australia)
- Hygrocybe constans - (Europe, North America)
- Hygrocybe corsica - (France)
- Hygrocybe discolor - (South Africa)
- Hygrocybe elegans - (New Zealand)
- Hygrocybe erythrocala - (Australia)
- Hygrocybe erythrocrenata - (Australia)
- Hygrocybe flammans - (Australia)
- Hygrocybe flavifolia - golden-gilled waxcap (North America)
- Hygrocybe flavocampanulata - (Puerto Rico, Trinidad)
- Hygrocybe flavolutea - (Jamaica)
- Hygrocybe fuhreri - (Australia)
- Hygrocybe fulgens - (Slovakia)
- Hygrocybe fuliginata - (New Zealand)
- Hygrocybe glacialis - (Europe, North America)
- Hygrocybe griseoramosa - (Australia)
- Hygrocybe hapuuae - halo'o hupu'u (Hawaii)
- Hygrocybe hololeuca - (Australia)
- Hygrocybe huronensis - (North America)
- Hygrocybe hypospoda - (Australia)
- Hygrocybe ignipileata - (South America)
- Hygrocybe incolor - (Australia)
- Hygrocybe iropus - (Australia)
- Hygrocybe jackmanii - (Canada)
- Hygrocybe kula - (Australia)
- Hygrocybe laboyi - (Puerto Rico)
- Hygrocybe laetissima - cherry-red waxy cap (North America)
- Hygrocybe lamalama - (Hawaii)
- Hygrocybe lanecovensis - (Australia)
- Hygrocybe lepida - goblet waxcap (Europe)
- Hygrocybe leucogloea - (Australia)
- Hygrocybe magnifica - (Brazil)
- Hygrocybe manadukaensis - (Western Ghats, India)
- Hygrocybe marchii - (Europe)
- Hygrocybe mexicana - (North America, South America, Hawaii, India)
- Hygrocybe miniceps - (New Zealand)
- Hygrocybe minimiholatra - (Madagascar)
- Hygrocybe minutula - (Europe, North America)
- Hygrocybe mitsinjoensi - (Madagascar)
- Hygrocybe moseri - (Europe)
- Hygrocybe mutabilis - (Brazil)
- Hygrocybe natarajanii - (India)
- Hygrocybe noelokelani - (Hawaii)
- Hygrocybe olivaceofirma - (Puerto Rico)
- Hygrocybe olivaceoviridis - (Japan)
- Hygrocybe pakelo - (Hawaii)
- Hygrocybe paraceracea - (Europe)
- Hygrocybe paraibensis - (Brazil)
- Hygrocybe parviholatra - (Madagascar)
- Hygrocybe peckii - (North America)
- Hygrocybe pellucida - (India)
- Hygrocybe pernambucensis - (Brazil)
- Hygrocybe polychroma - (Western Australia)
- Hygrocybe procera - red waxcap (New Zealand)
- Hygrocybe puaena - (Hawaii)
- Hygrocybe reesiae - (Australia)
- Hygrocybe rhodoleuca - (Brazil)
- Hygrocybe rhodophylla - (Italy)
- Hygrocybe rodwayi - (Australia)
- Hygrocybe roseoflavida - (Australia, New Zealand)
- Hygrocybe rubida - (India)
- Hygrocybe rubra - (North America)
- Hygrocybe rubronivea - (Australia)
- Hygrocybe saltirivula - (Australia)
- Hygrocybe sangayensis - (Ecuador)
- Hygrocybe schistophila - (Australia)
- Hygrocybe siccitatipapillata - (Australia)
- Hygrocybe silvae-araucariae - (Brazil)
- Hygrocybe similis - (Asia)
- Hygrocybe siparia - (Brazil)
- Hygrocybe snigdha - (India)
- Hygrocybe solis - (Madagascar)
- Hygrocybe squamulosa - (North America)
- Hygrocybe striatella - (Chile)
- Hygrocybe subcaespitosa - (Puerto Rico, Dominican Republic)
- Hygrocybe subceracea - (North America)
- Hygrocybe subflavida - (Trinidad, Cuba, South America)
- Hygrocybe subglobispora - (Europe)
- Hygrocybe subminiata - (North America)
- Hygrocybe subpapillata - papillate waxcap (Europe)
- Hygrocybe suzukaensis - (Japan)
- Hygrocybe swanetica - (Russia, Georgia)
- Hygrocybe sylvaria - (Australia)
- Hygrocybe tahquamenonensis - (North America)
- Hygrocybe troyana - (Jamaica, South America)
- Hygrocybe vintsy - (Madagascar)
- Hygrocybe viscidibrunnea - (Australia)
- Hygrocybe waolipo - (Hawaii)
- Hygrocybe watagensis - (Australia)
- Hygrocybe xanthopoda - (Australia, India)
