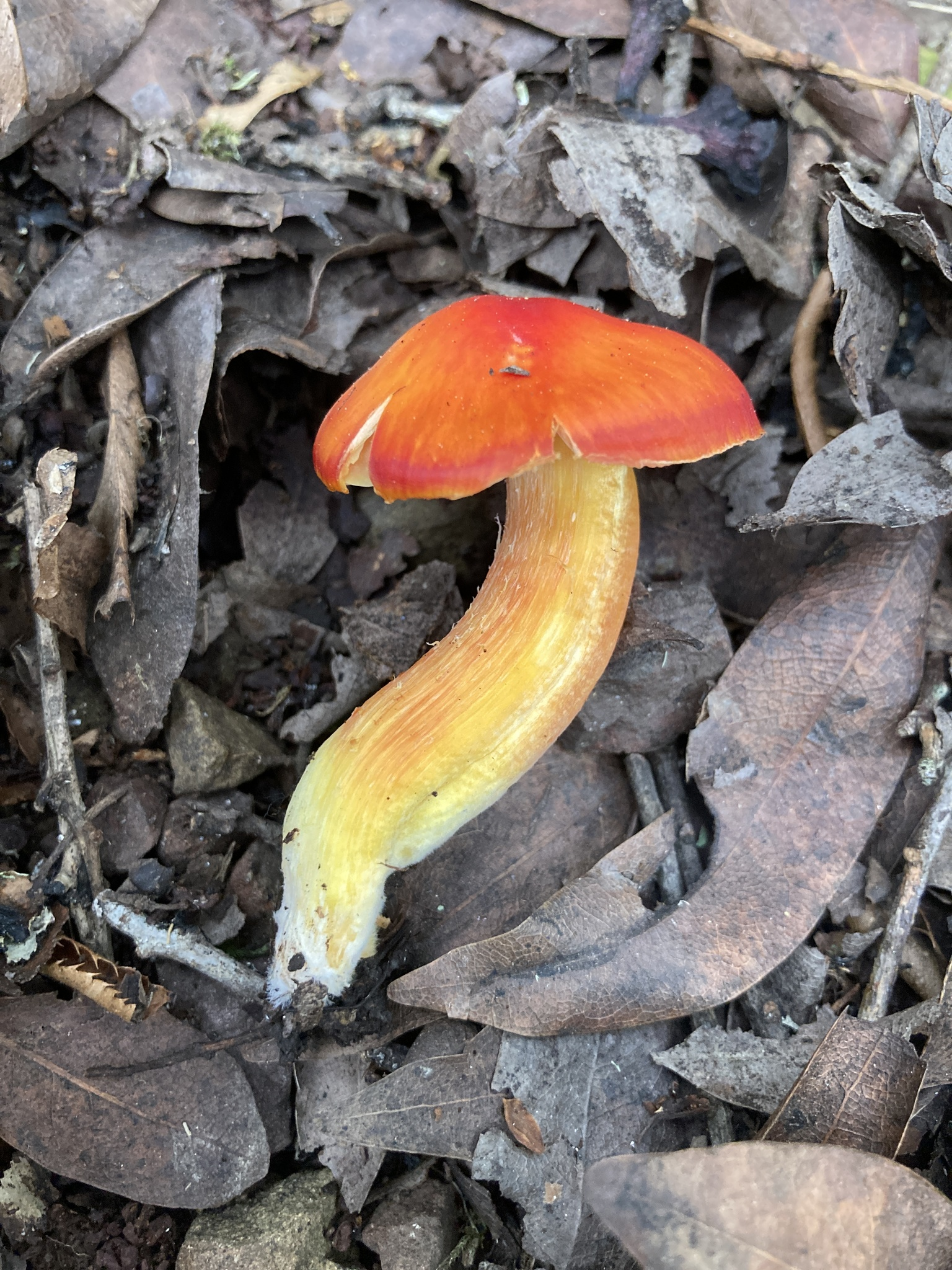
- Marin County, California, 2021

Scientific classification
- Domain: Eukaryota
- Kingdom: Fungi
- Division: Basidiomycota
- Class: Agaricomycetes
- Order: Agaricales
- Family: Hygrophoraceae
- Genus: Hygrocybe
- Species: H. laetissima

Binomial name
- Hygrocybe laetissima A.H. Sm. & Hesler, 1942

= Hygrocybe laetissima =

Fungus species

Hygrocybe laetissima, also known as the cherry-red waxy cap, is a species of gilled mushroom. It was first described by Alexander H. Smith and L. R. Hesler. It has the coloration of a Rainier cherry and is superficially similar to other waxy caps, including Hygrocybe splendidissima, H. punicea, H. aurantiosplendens, and H. marchii. It also overlaps somewhat in range and appearance with H. coccinea.

The species is found in North America and appears to flourish in association with redwood forests. It is not recommended as an edible mushroom because close cousins (namely, punicea) have made people sick.

== See also ==
- List of Hygrocybe species
