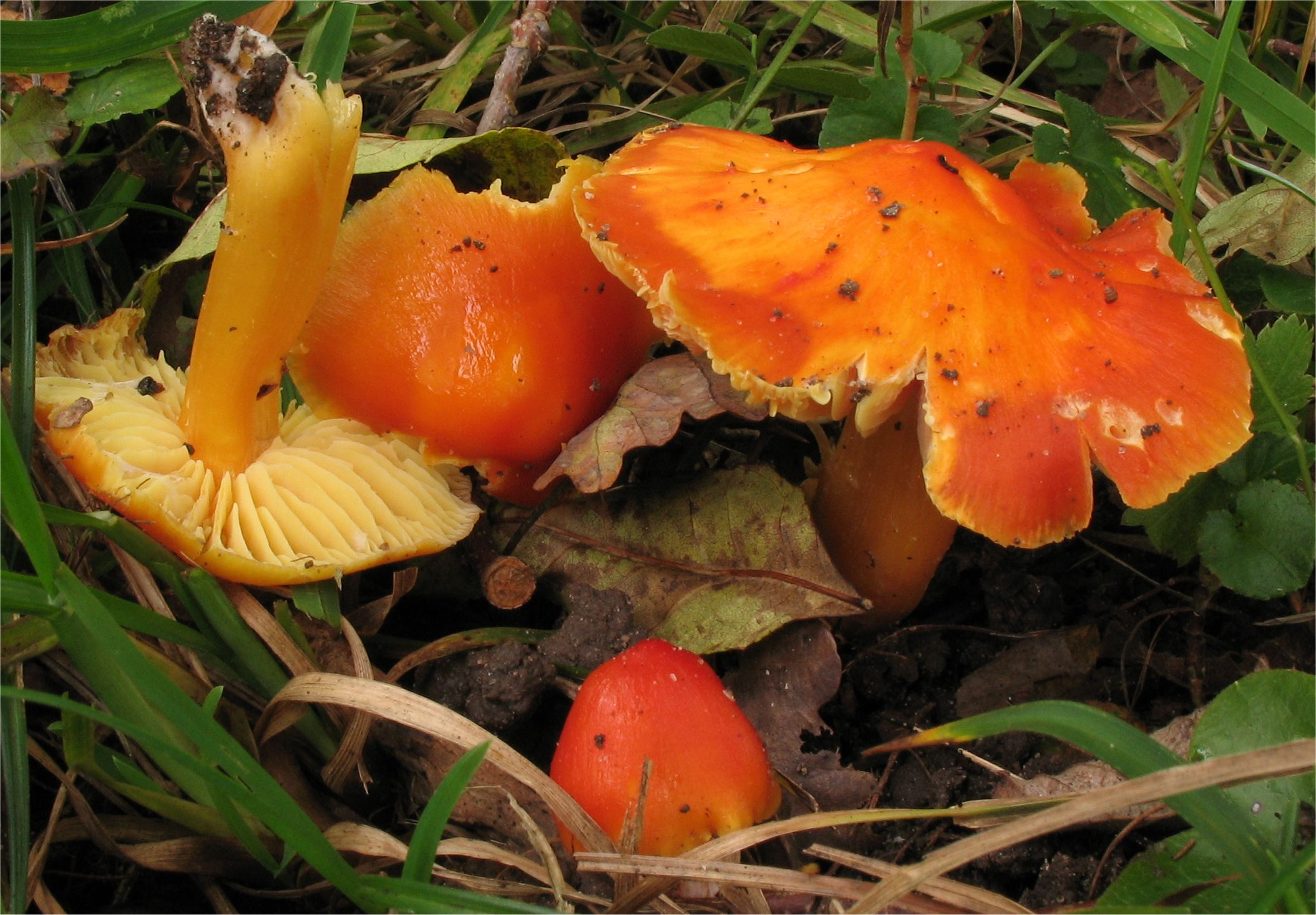

Conservation status
- Vulnerable (IUCN 3.1)

Scientific classification
- Kingdom: Fungi
- Division: Basidiomycota
- Class: Agaricomycetes
- Order: Agaricales
- Family: Hygrophoraceae
- Genus: Hygrocybe
- Species: H. aurantiosplendens

Binomial name
- Hygrocybe aurantiosplendens R.Haller Aar. (1954)

Synonyms
- Hygrophorus aurantiosplendens (R.Haller Aar.) P.D.Orton (1960)

= Hygrocybe aurantiosplendens =

Species of fungus

Hygrocybe aurantiosplendens
- Mycological characteristics
- Gills on hymenium
- Cap is conical or umbonate
- Hymenium is adnate
- Stipe is bare
- Spore print is white
- Ecology is parasitic
- Edibility is unknown

Hygrocybe aurantiosplendens is an agaric (gilled fungus) in the family Hygrophoraceae. In the United Kingdom, it has been given the recommended English name of orange waxcap. The species has a European distribution and typically occurs in grassland where it produces basidiocarps (fruit bodies) in the autumn. Threats to its habitat have resulted in the species being assessed as globally "vulnerable" on the IUCN Red List of Threatened Species. It has also been reported on both the East and West coasts of North America, but it is uncertain if the American ecotypes are in fact conspecific and they may represent distinct species.

== Taxonomy ==
The orange waxcap was originally described from Switzerland in 1954 by R. Haller Aar, a Swedish mycologist. The specific epithet comes from the Latin aurantius (= orange) + splendens (= shining).

Recent molecular research, based on cladistic analysis of DNA sequences, suggests that Hygrocybe aurantiosplendens belongs within the concept of Hygrocybe sensu stricto.

== Description ==
The basidiocarps are agaricoid, the cap initially broadly conical maturing to broadly umbonate, yellow-orange to orange-red, turning yellow with age, 2 to 5 cm (1 to 2 in) across, smooth, waxy to viscid when wet, with translucent margins. The lamellae (gills) are cap-coloured or paler, narrowly adnate. The stipe (stem) is yellow, white at base, sometimes tapering from the base, lacking a ring, 3 to 9 cm (1.5 to 3.5 in) long, 0.5 to 1 cm (0.2 to 0.4 in) thick. Microscopically, the spores are 7.5 to 9 by 4 to 5 μm, ellipsoid to oblong, often constricted in the middle, smooth, inamyloid, and the 4-spored basidia are up to 60 μm long. No distinct smell or taste.

=== Similar Species ===
Hygrocybe punicea can be similar to H. aurantiosplendens in shape and size, but is distinguished when young by its dark red colour and, when older or faded, by having a rougher stem and larger spores. The commoner Hygrocybe chlorophana is typically smaller, more consistently yellow, and has adnexed gills (narrowly attached to the stipe), not adnate; additionally, fruit bodies often develop pruina near the top of the stipe.

== Habitat and distribution ==
Like most other European Hygrocybe species, the orange waxcap typically grows in old, nutrient-poor, short-sward grassland (pastures and lawns). Although Hygrocybe species have been thought of as saprotrophic, new evidence points to a biotrophic or symbiotic association with moss.

Hygrocybe aurantiosplendens is widespread in Europe yet is rare to uncommon throughout its range. The British Isles and Scandinavia appear to be the regions with the greatest abundance of H. aurantiosplendens, but it also occurs in Finland, Iceland, Western Russia and high elevations in Southern Europe.

The American "H. aurantiosplendens" is more typical of woodlands. In Eastern North America its range extends sporadically from Maine south to Florida and west to Northern Wisconsin. On the West Coast it is largely restricted to coastal regions from Northern Washington to Central California, however this western taxon may be distinct enough to be considered its own species.

== Conservation ==
Hygrocybe aurantiosplendens is typical of waxcap grasslands, a declining habitat due to changing agricultural practices. As a result, the species is of global conservation concern and is listed as "vulnerable" on the IUCN Red List of Threatened Species. It is classified as a "high diversity indicator" (HDI) species by the Joint Nature Conservation Committee (JNCC) in the U.K. because its presence indicates high-quality grasslands. It is red-listed as endangered or vulnerable in many European countries.

== See also ==
- List of Hygrocybe species
