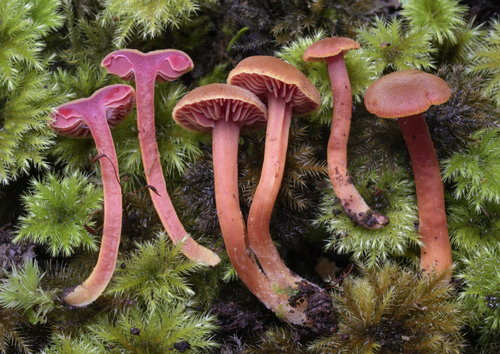
- On Ulva Island, New Zealand

Scientific classification
- Kingdom: Fungi
- Division: Basidiomycota
- Class: Agaricomycetes
- Order: Agaricales
- Family: Hygrophoraceae
- Genus: Hygrocybe
- Species: H. rubrocarnosa

Binomial name
- Hygrocybe rubrocarnosa Stevenson

= Hygrocybe rubrocarnosa =

Species of fungus

Hygrocybe rubrocarnosa is a species of gilled fungi in the genus Hygrocybe, which is commonly known as waxcaps. The species is endemic to New Zealand.

== Etymology ==
The name rubrocarnosa is derived from Latin, with the words rubro translating to red, and carnosa translating to fleshy, to achieve the name "red-fleshed". This is due to the colour and look of the fungi, as it is known to resemble raw red meat inside.

== Taxonomy ==
This species was described in 1963 by New Zealand botanist and mycologist Greta Stevenson. The holotype specimen was collected by Stevenson in Levin, New Zealand, in 1949. It was initially referred to as Hygrophorus rubrocarnosus in the first publication, however, the name was later changed to Hygrocybe rubrocarnosa when further research showed the fungi belonged more appropriately in a smaller, more defined genus. In the past, Hygrophorus was a broad genus that included many bright-colored fungi with waxy caps, but in more recent years, species such as Hygrophorus rubrocarnosus have been reclassified into their own separate genus, Hygrocybe, based on updated taxonomic studies.

== Description ==
The pileus ranges from 10 to 35 mm (0.4 to 1.4 in) in diameter. It begins as a rounded dome, then flattens or spreads out into a more irregular shape. The colour varies from bright to deep red, often fading to orange-yellow with age. The surface is usually smooth, though it can become slightly fibrous or develop tiny scales in older specimens. The edge of the pileus may sometimes appear lined or grooved. The flesh inside is bright red, firm, and relatively thick.

The gills underneath the pileus are broadly attached, they are a deep red when the fungi are juvenile and become a lighter red or cream when mature. The gills are fairly thick, spaced apart, and the edges are the same colour as the rest of the gill. The stipe is 25 to 70 mm long and 2 to 6 mm thick, cylindric and usually equal, though it may be narrower towards the base. It is bright orange-yellow at the top, concolorous with the pileus but paler toward the base. The surface is silky with fine, longitudinal fibers and may appear twisted or even split. It is hollow or loosely packed but quite tough, and the flesh inside is deep red. The inside of both the pileus and stipe is deep red, especially near the outer layer. The mushroom has no distinctive taste or smell.

The basidiospore are about 7.5 to 10.5 micrometers long and 4 to 6 micrometers wide. They are shaped like pears or ovals, sometimes with a noticeable narrowing or constriction. The surface is smooth, clear, and thin-walled. The basidia are 45 to 65 micrometers long and 5 to 8 micrometers wide. Each one produces either two or four basidiospores. Cystidia are absent.

The pileipellis consists of suberect ends of the hyphae 5–10 micrometer in diameter forming the small scales. The membrane is not gelatinized, and has a noticeable yellowish-red pigment dissolved in the cell sap. There are numerous clamp connections. There is no chemical colour change when KOH (potassium hydroxide) is added.

== Habitat ==
Found in forest litter (leaves, twigs, plant debris, etc.) in clusters or singular, under podocarps, Dacrydium, Nothofagus and Cyathea in New Zealand.

== See also ==
- List of Hygrocybe species
