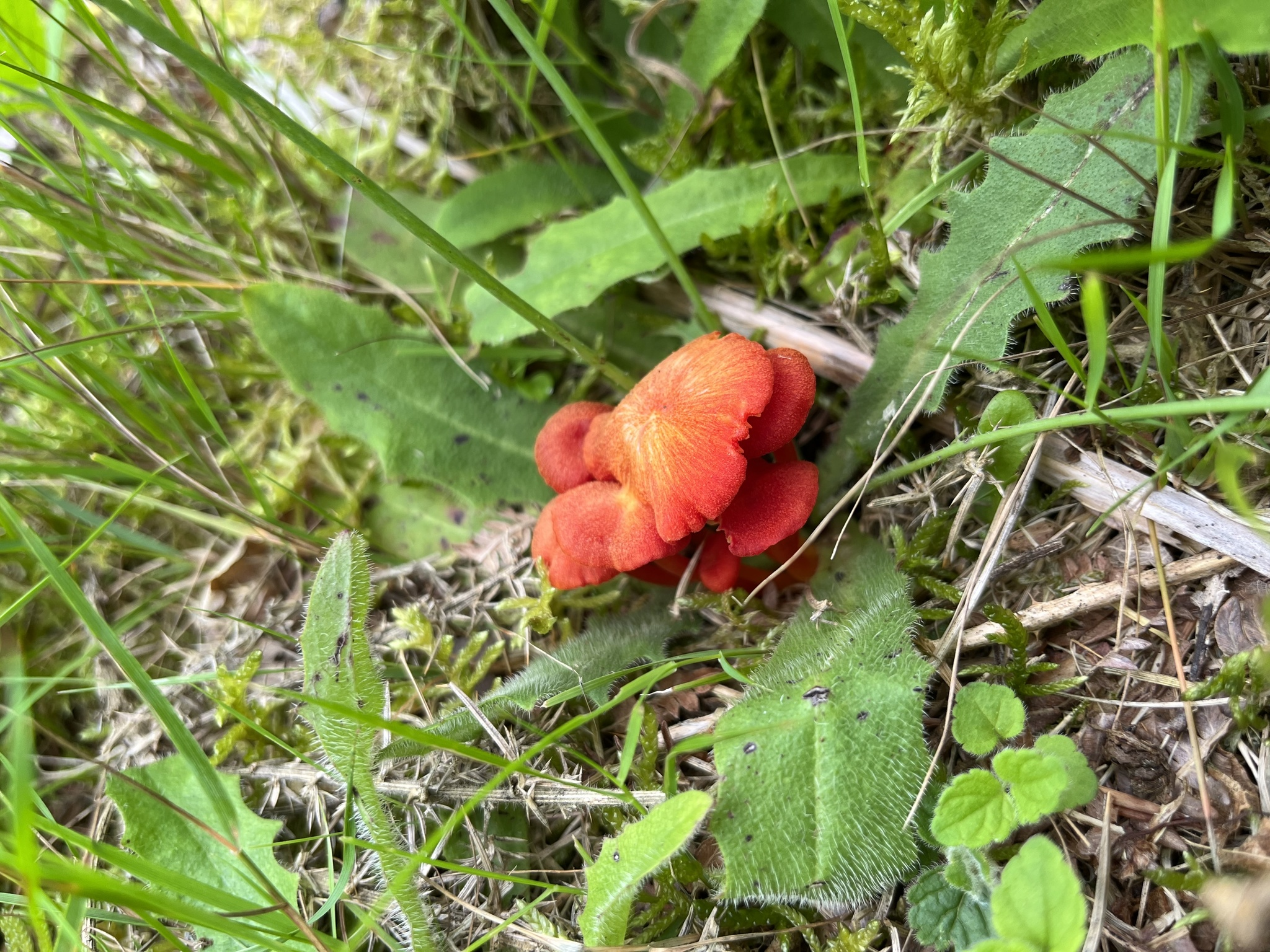

Conservation status
- Near Threatened (IUCN 3.1)

Scientific classification
- Kingdom: Fungi
- Division: Basidiomycota
- Class: Agaricomycetes
- Order: Agaricales
- Family: Hygrophoraceae
- Genus: Hygrocybe
- Species: H. helobia

Binomial name
- Hygrocybe helobia (Arnolds) Bon (1976)

Synonyms
- Hygrophorus helobius Arnolds (1974) Neohygrocybe helobia (Arnolds) Kovalenko (1988)

= Hygrocybe helobia =

Species of fungus

Hygrocybe helobia is a species of agaric (gilled mushroom) in the family Hygrophoraceae. It has been given the recommended English name of garlic waxcap. The species has a European distribution and typically occurs in grassland where it produces basidiocarps (fruit bodies) in the autumn. Threats to its habitat have resulted in the species being assessed as globally "near threatened" on the IUCN Red List of Threatened Species.

== Taxonomy ==
The species was first described in 1974 by the Dutch mycologist Eef Arnolds as Hygrophorus helobius and was later moved to the genus Hygrocybe.

Recent molecular research, based on cladistic analysis of DNA sequences, suggests that Hygrocybe helobia belongs within the concept of Hygrocybe sensu stricto.

== Description ==
The basidiocarps are agaricoid, up to 4 cm (2 in) tall, the cap shallowly convex to flat, up to 2 cm (1 in) across. The cap surface is dry, matt, and finely squamulose (scaly), bright scarlet becoming orange when old. The lamellae (gills) are waxy, white to orange-red, and broadly attached to the stipe. The stipe (stem) is smooth, cylindrical, matt, and cap-coloured becoming paler towards the base. The spore print is white, the spores (under a microscope) smooth, inamyloid, broadly ellipsoid to oblong, about 8 to 10 by 5 to 6 μm. May have a garlic smell, especially if kept in a small container for a while.

=== Similar species ===
Other European waxcaps of similar size and colour are smooth-capped (not finely scaly) or have decurrent gills or scales that become blackish. Hygrocybe miniata, which does have a scaly cap, is typically larger, lacks the garlic smell, and has differently shaped spores.

== Distribution and habitat ==
The garlic waxcap is widespread throughout Europe, where it typically grows in old, unimproved, short-sward grassland (pastures and lawns). Recent research suggests waxcaps are neither mycorrhizal nor saprotrophic but may be associated with mosses.

== Conservation ==
Hygrocybe helobia is typical of waxcap grasslands, a declining habitat due to changing agricultural practices. As a result, the species is of global conservation concern and is listed as "near threatened" on the IUCN Red List of Threatened Species.

== See also ==
- List of Hygrocybe species
