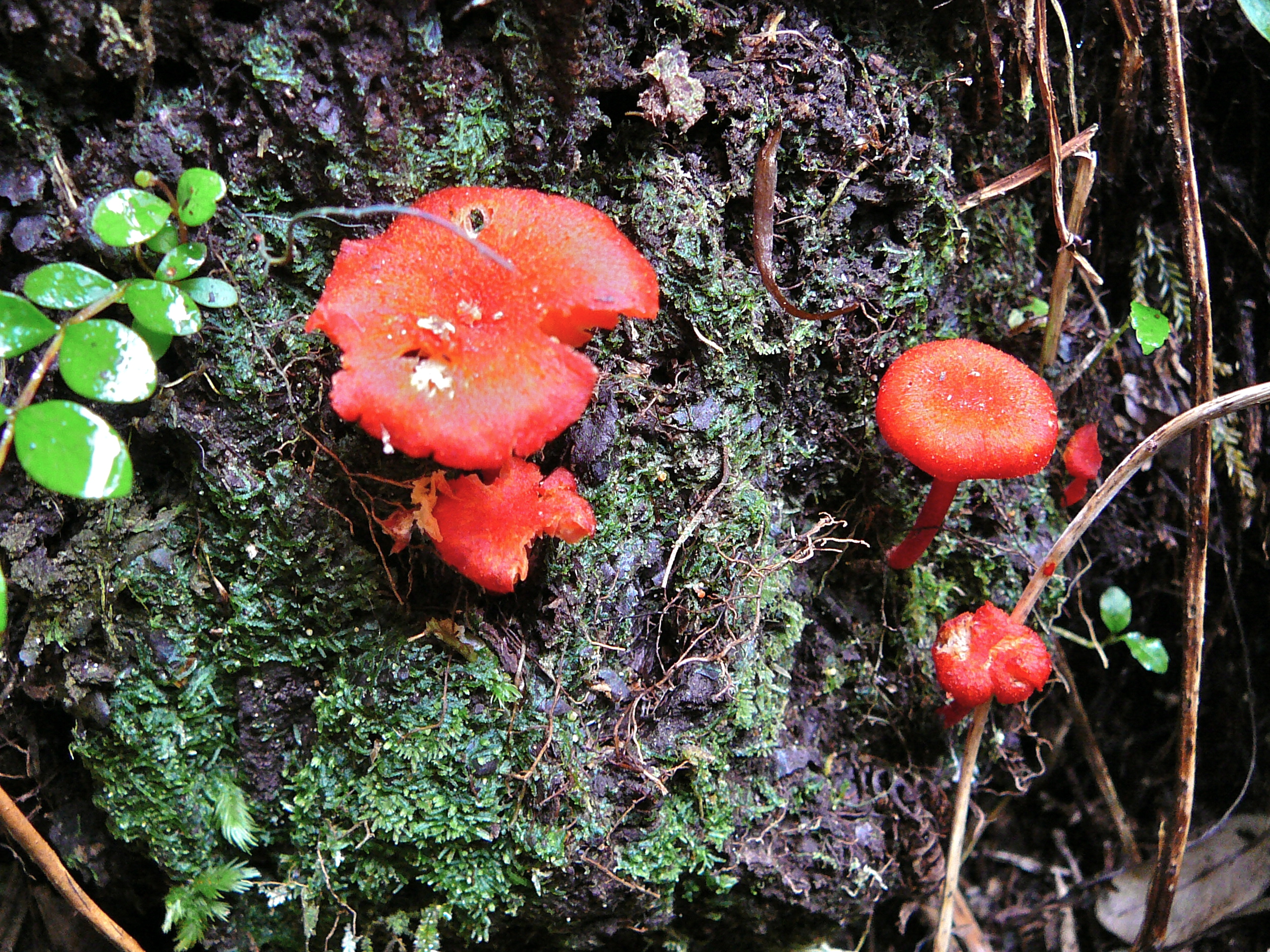
- On ridge below Tamahine o Kawera, Karioi

Scientific classification
- Kingdom: Fungi
- Division: Basidiomycota
- Class: Agaricomycetes
- Order: Agaricales
- Family: Hygrophoraceae
- Genus: Hygrocybe
- Species: H. procera

Binomial name
- Hygrocybe procera (G.Stev.) E.Horak (1971)

Synonyms
- Hygrophorus procerus G.Stev. (1963); Hygrocybe procera (G.Stev.) E.Horak (1973); Pseudohygrocybe procera (G.Stev.) Kovalenko (1988)

= Hygrocybe procera =

Species of fungus

Hygrocybe procera is a species of agaric (gilled mushroom) in the family Hygrophoraceae. First described as Hygrophorus procerus by Greta Stevenson in 1963, the species was transferred to Hygrocybe in 1971 by Egon Horak. It is only known with certainty from New Zealand.

== Description ==
The fruit bodies of this fungus are red, orange or yellow with a cap up to 5 cm in diameter, and a 15–70 x 3–6 mm cylindrical stipe (stem) of uniform diameter, or tapering towards its base. It is seen between February and June in forests.

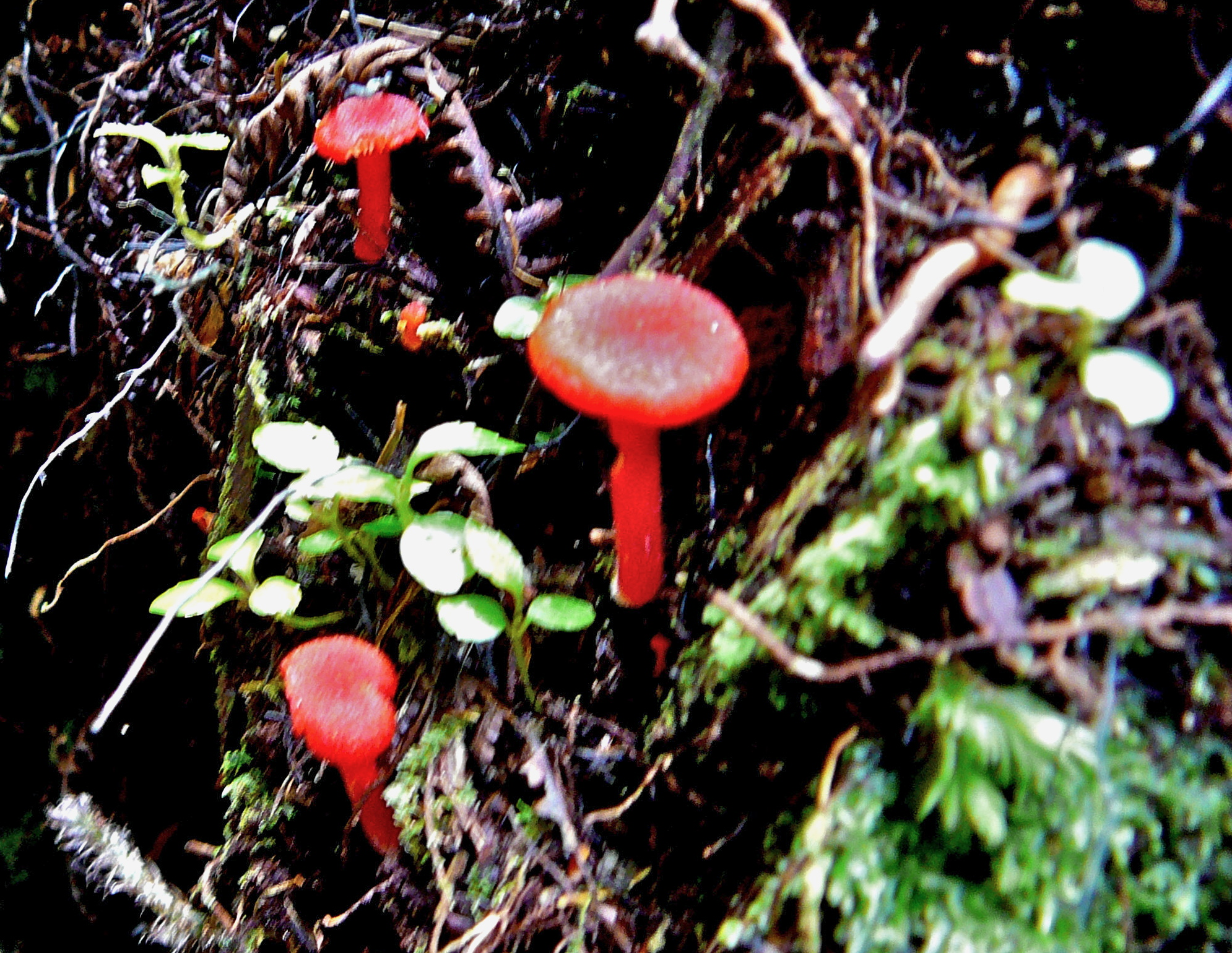
Younger specimens also on Mount Karioi.

== See also ==
- List of Hygrocybe species
