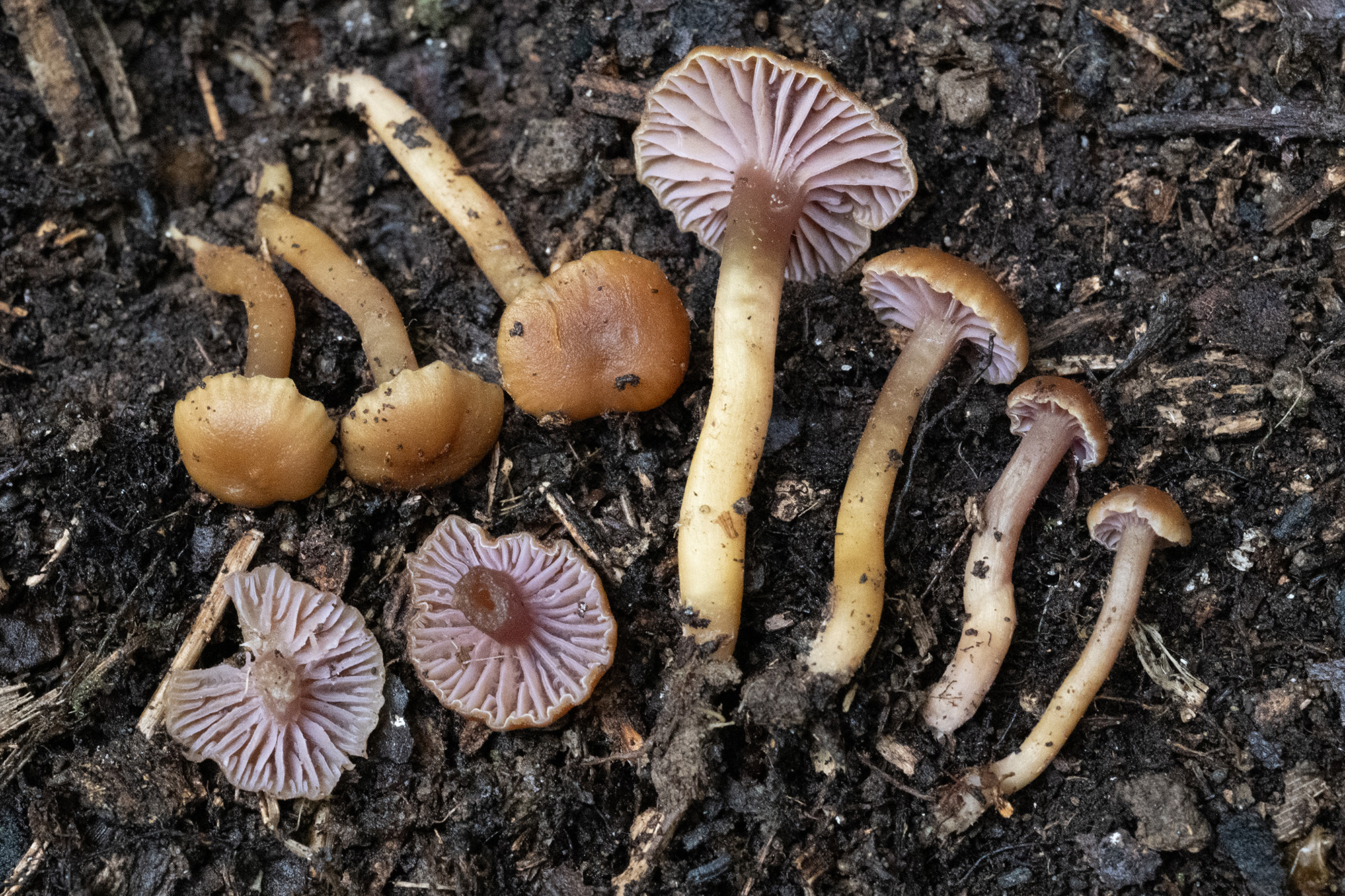
- Hygrocybe lilaceolamellata fruiting bodies

Scientific classification
- Kingdom: Fungi
- Division: Basidiomycota
- Class: Agaricomycetes
- Order: Agaricales
- Family: Hygrophoraceae
- Genus: Hygrocybe
- Species: H. lilaceolamellata

Binomial name
- Hygrocybe lilaceolamellata G.Stev. (1963)

= Hygrocybe lilaceolamellata =

Species of fungus

Hygrocybe lilaceolamellata
- Mycological characteristics
- Gills on hymenium
- Cap is convex
- Hymenium is adnate or decurrent
- Ecology is mycorrhizal
- Edibility is unknown

Hygrocybe lilaceolamellata is a species of mushroom of the family Hygrophoraceae. It was first described by the New Zealand mycologist Greta Stevenson in 1963. The fungus is believed to be ectomycorrhizal, meaning it has symbiotic relationships with plants. H. lilaceolamellata is present in Australia and New Zealand, where it grows in groups on soil. The species is unique within the genus Hygrocybe due to its warm brown cap (pileus) and the lilac gills (lamellae) on the underside. Its spores vary in size and shape.

== Taxonomy ==
Hygrocybe lilaceolamellata was first described by the New Zealand mycologist Greta Stevenson in 1963. The type specimen was collected in 1949 in Wellington Botanic Garden. The basionym (original scientific name) of the species had the specific epithet, lilaceolamellatus, but it was later changed to lilceolamellata by Egon Horak in 1973. The species is unique within the genus Hygrocybe due to its warm brown cap (pileus) and the lilac gills (lamellae) on the underside. Some samples of this species have gills that are not expected of Hygrocybe, and further research may show that this species belongs in the genus Hygrophorus.

== Description ==
The fruit bodies (basidiocarps) of H. lilaceolamellata have 40 mm wide caps (pilei). They are convex, with the centre becoming flat or slightly depressed as they mature. The caps are warm brown, orange-brown to honey-brown in colour, with a distinctly reddish-brown centre that fades with age. When moist, the cap is slimy. The cap is hygrophanous, meaning its colour changes as it loses moisture. The gills (lamellae) are a bright lilac to violet colour, and can have a brown to olive tint. The gills are adnate to decurrent, and can be 6 mm wide. The stipes are 20–50 × 2–6 mm in length and width. They are cylindrical, paler at the base, and hollow. The species varies in spore size and shape. New Zealand material examined by Horak found one example of spores to measure 7–9 × 3.5–5 μm. They can be ellipsoid, oblong, to pear-shaped. The basidia measure 35–70 × 6–8 μm. The hyphae measure 3–6 μm. The taste and smell of the mushroom are not distinctive.

== Distribution and habitat ==
The species is native to Australia and New Zealand. In Australia, H. lilaceolamellata's range is known to cover New South Wales and Tasmania. Fruiting bodies of H. lilaceolamellata grow in groups on soil, in mossy areas or in leaf litter, in woodlands, forests, or in temperate rainforests. In New Zealand, the species typically fruits between May to July. The fruiting bodies have been recorded growing in mixed hardwood and conifer forests, where the canopy cover may consist of Beilschmiedia, Leptospermum, Metrosideros, and Pterophylla with tree ferns from the genera Cyathea and Dicksonia. The fungus is ectomycorrhizal, meaning it has symbiotic relationships with plants, but it was previously thought to be saprobic, meaning it obtains nutrients by breaking down organic material. Orlovich & Cairney (2004) list Nothofagus, Kunzea, and Leptospermum as hosts for New Zealand Hygrocybe.

== Works cited ==
Journals

- Horak, Egon (1990). "Monograph of the New Zealand Hygrophoraceae (Agaricales)". New Zealand Journal of Botany. 28 (3): 255–309. doi:10.1080/0028825X.1990.10412313. ISSN 0028-825X.
- McKenzie, E. H. C.; Johnston, P. R.; Buchanan, P. K. (2006). "Checklist of fungi on teatree (Kunzea and Leptospermum species) in New Zealand". New Zealand Journal of Botany. 44 (3): 293–335. doi:10.1080/0028825X.2006.9513025. ISSN 0028-825X.
- Orlovich, David A.; Cairney, Johnw. G. (2004). "Ectomycorrhizal fungi in New Zealand: Current perspectives and future directions". New Zealand Journal of Botany. 42 (5): 721–738. doi:10.1080/0028825X.2004.9512926. ISSN 0028-825X.
- Stevenson, Greta (1963). "The Agaricales of New Zealand: IV". Kew Bulletin. 16 (3): 373. doi:10.2307/4114672.
- Young, A. M.; Wood, A. E. (1999). "Studies on the Hygrophoraceae (Fungi, Homobasidiomycetes, Agaricales) of Australia". Australian Systematic Botany. 10 (6). CSIRO Publishing: 911–1030. doi:10.1071/sb96005. ISSN 1030-1887.
- Young, A. M. (2000). "Contributed Papers Additions to the Hygrophoraceae (Fungi, Agaricales) of south-eastern Australia". Muelleria. 13. Biodiversity Heritage Library. doi:10.5962/bhl.title.112965.
- Young, Tony; Mills, A. K. (2002). "The Hygrophoraceae of Tasmania". Muelleria. 16. Biodiversity Heritage Library: 3–28. doi:10.5962/p.254654. ISSN 0077-1813.
