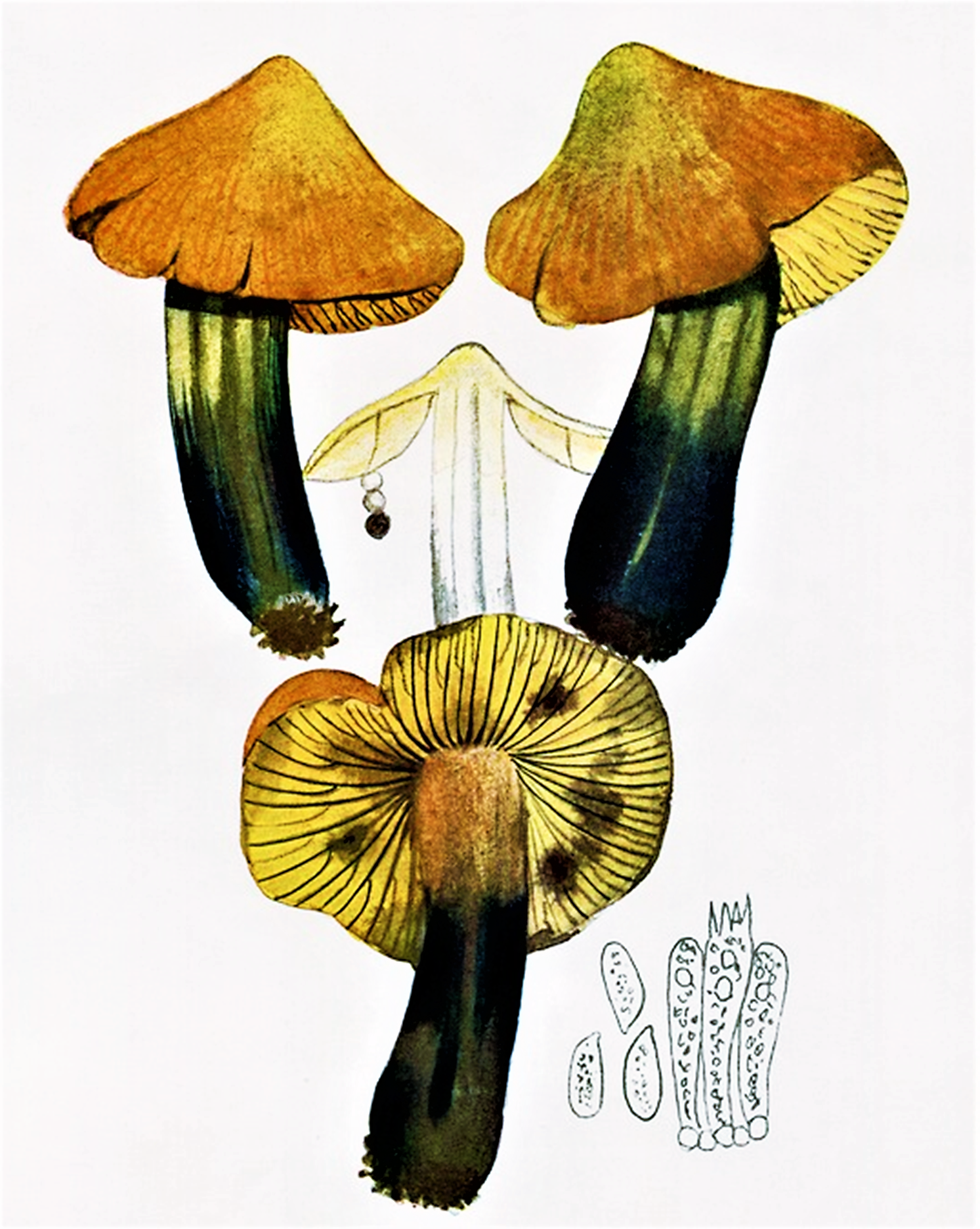

Scientific classification
- Domain: Eukaryota
- Kingdom: Fungi
- Division: Basidiomycota
- Class: Agaricomycetes
- Order: Agaricales
- Family: Hygrophoraceae
- Genus: Hygrocybe
- Species: H. nigrescens

Binomial name
- Hygrocybe nigrescens (Quél.) Kühner

Synonyms
- Hygrocybe conica var. nigrescens (Quél.) Hallgr.; Hygrocybe nigrescens (Quél.) Quél.; Hygrophorus conicus subsp. nigrescens (Quel.) Konr. & Maubl.; Hygrophorus conicus var. nigrescens (Quél.) Konrad & Maubl.; Hygrophorus nigrescens (Quél.) Quél.; Hygrophorus puniceus subsp. nigrescens (Quél.) Sacc.; Hygrophorus puniceus var. nigrescens Quél.

= Hygrocybe nigrescens =

Species of fungus

Hygrocybe nigrescens Mycological characteristics
- Gills on hymenium
- Cap is conical
- Hymenium is adnexed
- Stipe is bare
- Spore print is white
- Ecology is mycorrhizal
- Edibility is edible

Hygrocybe nigrescens, commonly known as the blackening wax-cap, is a mushroom of the waxcap genus Hygrocybe. It is found in Europe and Africa. It has been treated as the variety nigrescens of Hygrocybe conica.

== See also ==
- List of Hygrocybe species
