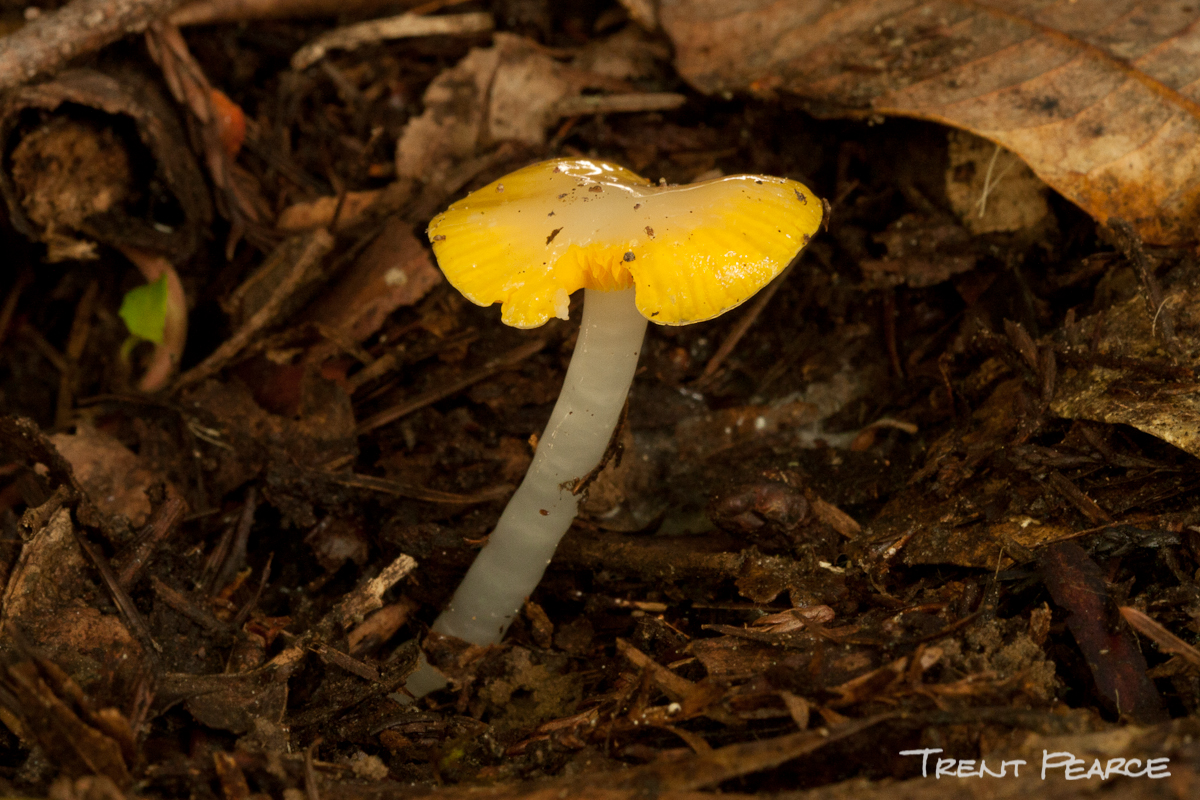

Conservation status
- Endangered (IUCN 3.1)

Scientific classification
- Kingdom: Fungi
- Division: Basidiomycota
- Class: Agaricomycetes
- Order: Agaricales
- Family: Hygrophoraceae
- Genus: Hygrocybe
- Species: H. flavifolia

Binomial name
- Hygrocybe flavifolia (A.H.Sm. & Hesler) Singer (1951)

Synonyms
- Hygrophorus flavifolius A.H.Sm. & Hesler (1942)

= Hygrocybe flavifolia =

Species of fungus

Hygrocybe flavifolia is a mushroom of the waxcap genus Hygrocybe. Found in North America, it was described as new to science by Alexander H. Smith and Lexemuel Ray Hesler in 1942 as a species of Hygrophorus. Rolf Singer transferred it to Hygrocybe in 1945.

== See also ==
- List of Hygrocybe species
- List of fungi by conservation status
