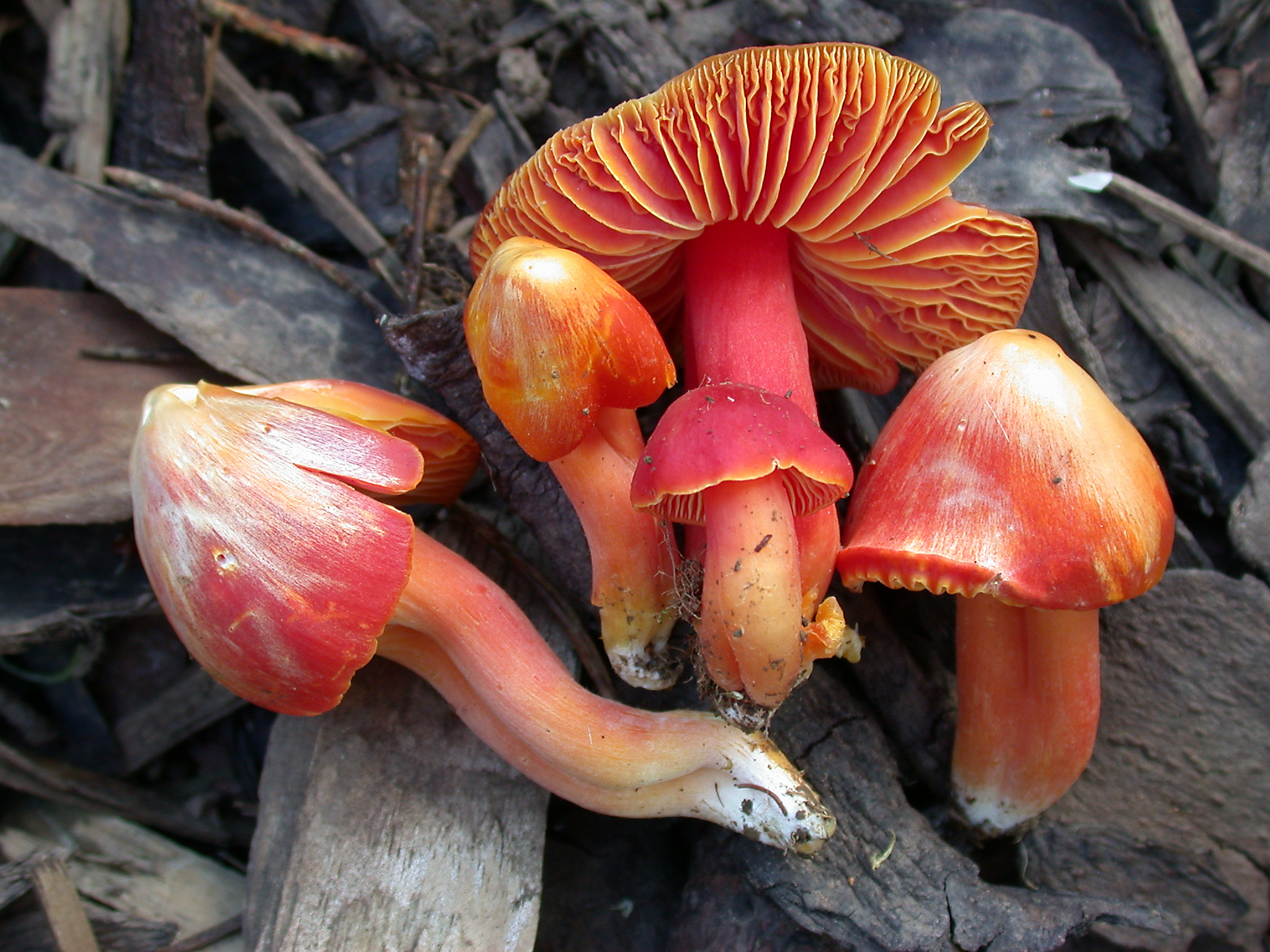

Conservation status
- Vulnerable (IUCN 3.1)

Scientific classification
- Kingdom: Fungi
- Division: Basidiomycota
- Class: Agaricomycetes
- Order: Agaricales
- Family: Hygrophoraceae
- Genus: Hygrocybe
- Species: H. splendidissima

Binomial name
- Hygrocybe splendidissima (P.D.Orton) M.M.Moser (1967)

Synonyms
- Hygrophorus splendidissimus P.D.Orton (1960); Hygrocybe punicea f. splendidissima (P.D.Orton) D.A.Reid (1972)

= Hygrocybe splendidissima =

Species of fungus

Hygrocybe splendidissima, is a species of agaric (gilled mushroom) in the family Hygrophoraceae. It has been given the recommended English name of splendid waxcap. The species has a European distribution, occurring mainly in agriculturally unimproved grassland. Threats to its habitat have resulted in the species being assessed as globally "vulnerable" on the IUCN Red List of Threatened Species.

== Taxonomy ==
The species was first described in 1960 by British mycologist P. D. Orton as a species of Hygrophorus. The type was collected by Orton in fields near Membury, Devon, in 1957 Meinhard Moser transferred the species to the genus Hygrocybe in 1967.

Recent molecular research, based on cladistic analysis of DNA sequences, has shown that Hygrocybe splendidissima is distinct and belongs in Hygrocybe sensu stricto.

== Description ==
The basidiocarps are agaricoid, up to 10 cm (4 in) tall, the cap conical to convex at first, retaining a broad umbo or becoming flat when expanded, up to 7 cm (2 3/4 in) across. The cap surface is smooth and dry, deep scarlet, paler when dry. The lamellae (gills) are waxy, cap-coloured or orange. The stipe (stem) is smooth, cap-coloured to orange, lacking a ring. The spore print is white, the spores (under a microscope) smooth, inamyloid, ellipsoid, c. 7.5 to 9.0 by 4.5 to 5.5 μm. Fruit bodies have a distinct honey smell when rubbed or when drying.

=== Similar species ===
The species can normally be distinguished in the field, thanks to its size and colour. It was formerly confused with Hygrocybe punicea (the crimson waxcap), but fruitbodies of the latter species are a darker, duller red, have slightly viscid caps, and fibrillose stems. Fruit bodies of H. coccinea (scarlet waxcap) are typically much smaller and have slightly viscid caps that are nodulose under a lens. Both these species lack the distinctive smell of H. splendidissima, though the much smaller, orange-red H. reidii also has a honey smell.

== Distribution and habitat ==
The splendid waxcap is widespread but generally rare throughout Europe, with the largest populations in the United Kingdom, Germany, Sweden, Denmark, and Norway. Like other waxcaps, it occurs in old, agriculturally unimproved, short-sward grassland (pastures and lawns).

Recent research suggests waxcaps are neither mycorrhizal nor saprotrophic but may be associated with mosses.

== Conservation ==
Hygrocybe splendidissima is typical of waxcap grasslands, a declining habitat due to changing agricultural practices. As a result, the species is of global conservation concern and is listed as "vulnerable" on the IUCN Red List of Threatened Species. Hygrocybe splendidissima also appears on the official or provisional national red lists of threatened fungi in several European countries, including Croatia, Denmark, Germany, Norway, and Sweden.
