= Hygrocybe constans =

Scientific classification
- Kingdom: Fungi
- Division: Basidiomycota
- Class: Agaricomycetes
- Order: Agaricales
- Family: Hygrophoraceae
- Genus: Hygrocybe
- Species: H. constans

Binomial name
- Hygrocybe constans Murrill

Species of fungus

Hygrocybe constans is a species of mushroom in the family Hygrophoraceae. It was first described by William Murrill in 1912.

== Description ==
The cap of Hygrocybe constans is about 1.5 centimeters in diameter and red in color. It is umbilicate and smooth. The stipe is about 7 centimeters long and 5 millimeters wide. It is hollow. The apex is the same color as the cap and the base is ocher. The gills are adnate. They start out creamy or pale yellowish and become yellow to yellowish orange as the mushroom matures.

=== Similar species ===
Hygrocybe constans
- Mycological characteristics
- Gills on hymenium
- Cap is umbilicate
- Hymenium is adnate
- Stipe is bare
- Spore print is white
- Edibility is edible

Hygrocybe constans has several lookalikes. H. substrangulata is similar but has a scaly to warty cap, while the H. cantharellus complex is variable, and can be differentiated by the presence of decurrent gills and a long, thin stipe. H. phaeococcinea is also similar but has slightly decurrent, orange gills and a darker colored cap and stipe. H. miniata is also similar, but its red color fades when dried.

== Habitat and distribution ==
Hygrocybe constans is found in forests in the Pacific Northwest, where it often grows under western redcedar. The type locality is Mill City, Oregon.
