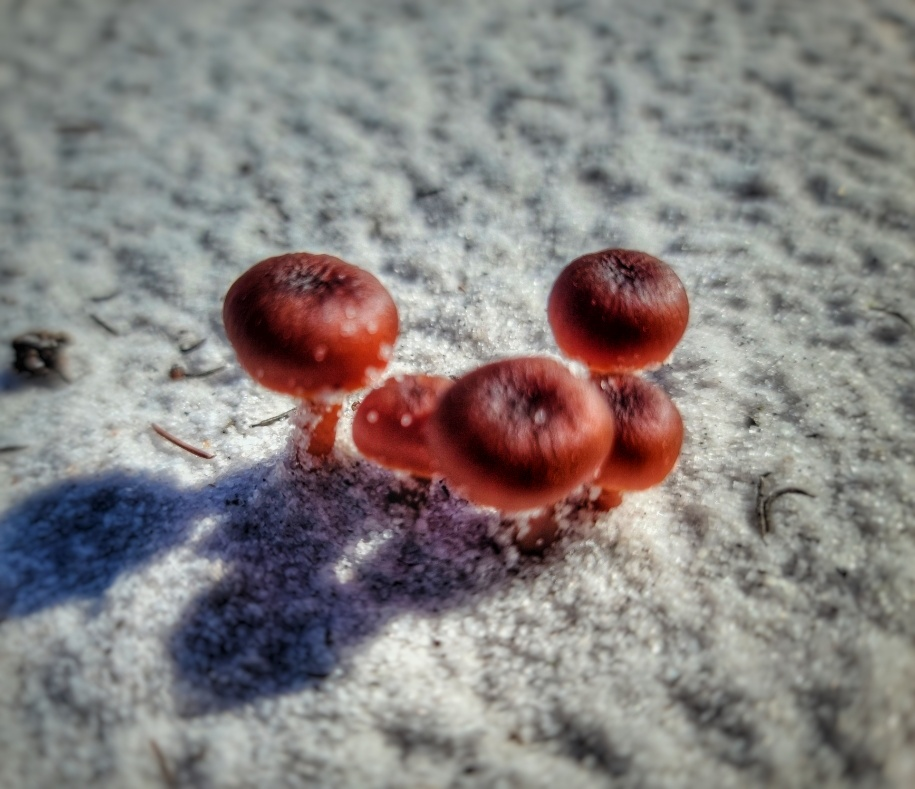
- Gulfshore Waxcap pictured on sand dune

Scientific classification
- Kingdom: Fungi
- Division: Basidiomycota
- Class: Agaricomycetes
- Order: Agaricales
- Family: Hygrophoraceae
- Genus: Hygrocybe
- Species: H. andersonii

Binomial name
- Hygrocybe andersonii Cibula & N.S.Weber (1996)

= Hygrocybe andersonii =

Species of fungus

Hygrocybe andersonii
- Mycological characteristics
- Gills on hymenium
- Cap is convex or depressed
- Hymenium is sinuate or subdecurrent
- Stipe is bare
- Spore print is white
- Edibility is unknown

Hygrocybe andersonii is a species of agaric (gilled mushroom) in the family Hygrophoraceae. It is sometimes referred to by common names gulfshore waxcap and clustered dune hygrocybe. The species has a North American distribution, occurring mainly on sand dune shorelines along the Gulf Coast of the United States. It was formally described and published by William Cibula and Nancy S. Weber in 1996, with the specific epithet honoring Mississippi watercolorist Walter Inglis Anderson.

== Description ==
Basidiocarps are agaricoid, the cap convex with a flattened to depressed disc measuring 1.3 to 3.3 cm across. The cap surface is smooth to slightly scurfy, varying from yellow orange to scarlet, becoming reddish brown to almost black with age. The lamellae (gills) are waxy, yellow orange to deep orange, becoming blackish with age. The stipe (stem) is smooth, colored like the cap, yellow towards base, lacking a ring. The spore print is white, the spores (under a microscope) smooth, rod-shaped with distinct projection, inamyloid, and hyaline, measuring about 16 to 19 by 3.8 to 5.6 μm.

== Distribution and habitat ==
The gulfshore waxcap is found in North America, occurring exclusively along the Gulf Coast on shorelines. The mycelium spreads between the grains of sand dunes, and is associated with seaside rosemary (Ceratiola ericoides). This species is believed to play an important part in dune stabilization of barrier islands.

Some research suggests waxcaps are neither mycorrhizal nor saprotrophic but may be associated with mosses.

== Etymology ==
William Cibula wrote that the name of the species was to honor Walter Inglis Anderson who "first encountered and painted this Hygrocybe in 1960".

The work he references in the journal Mycologia as “Watercolor No. 416, Anderson collection” may be "Dunes - Horn Island (1958) ”.

== See also ==
- List of Hygrocybe species
