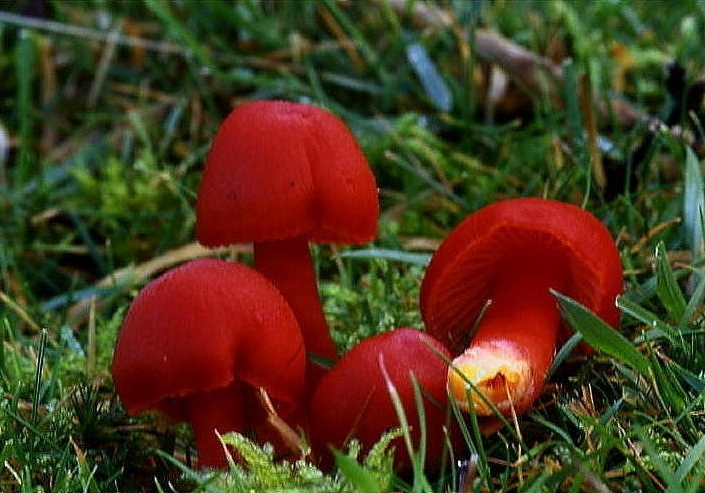

Conservation status
- Apparently Secure (NatureServe)

Scientific classification
- Kingdom: Fungi
- Division: Basidiomycota
- Class: Agaricomycetes
- Order: Agaricales
- Family: Hygrophoraceae
- Genus: Hygrocybe
- Species: H. coccinea

Binomial name
- Hygrocybe coccinea (Schaeff.) P. Kumm.

= Hygrocybe coccinea =

Hygrocybe coccinea
- Mycological characteristics
- Gills on hymenium
- Cap is convex
- Hymenium is adnate
- Stipe is bare
- Spore print is white
- Ecology is mycorrhizal
- Edibility is edible but not recommended

Hygrocybe coccinea, sometimes called the scarlet waxy cap, scarlet hood, scarlet waxcap or righteous red waxy cap, is a colourful fungus of the genus Hygrocybe, forming a small red (but indistinct) mushroom.

It is found across the Northern Hemisphere, being a familiar sight in unimproved grasslands of Europe in late summer and autumn, and in woodlands of North America in winter. It is edible but of low interest.

== Taxonomy ==
The scarlet hood was first described as Agaricus coccineus by German mycologist Jacob Christian Schäffer in 1774, before being transferred to the genus Hygrophorus by Elias Magnus Fries in 1838, and finally Hygrocybe by Paul Kummer in 1871. The specific epithet coccinea is Latin for "scarlet".

== Description ==
A small waxcap with an initially bell-shaped, and later flattening, cap 2–5 centimetres (3/4–2 in) across, scarlet in colour and slimy in texture. The adnate gills are thick and widely spaced, yellow red in colour. The ringless stipe is 2–5 cm tall and 0.3–1 cm (1/8–3/8 in) wide, red with a yellowish base. The flesh is yellowish-red and the smell and taste faint. The oval spores measure 7–9.5 x 4–5 μm and produce a white spore print.

=== Similar species ===
It is fairly similar to some other members of its genus, including H. marchii and H. punicea.

== Distribution and habitat ==
Hygrocybe coccinea has a wide distribution in unimproved grasslands across Europe from August to October. In Britain, like all Hygrocybes, it has its best seasons in frost-free late autumn months, and in western North America it may be found under redwoods or in mixed woodland in winter. It has been recorded growing under Rhododendron and oak (Quercus) in Sagarmatha National Park in Nepal, and also occurs in India, China and Japan.

Specimens initially identified as H. coccinea in Australia have been reclassified as H. miniata or H. kandora.

== Edibility ==
The species is edible, possibly even when raw, but is of fairly little interest. H. punicea is very similar and may be harmful if eaten.

== See also ==
- List of Hygrocybe species
