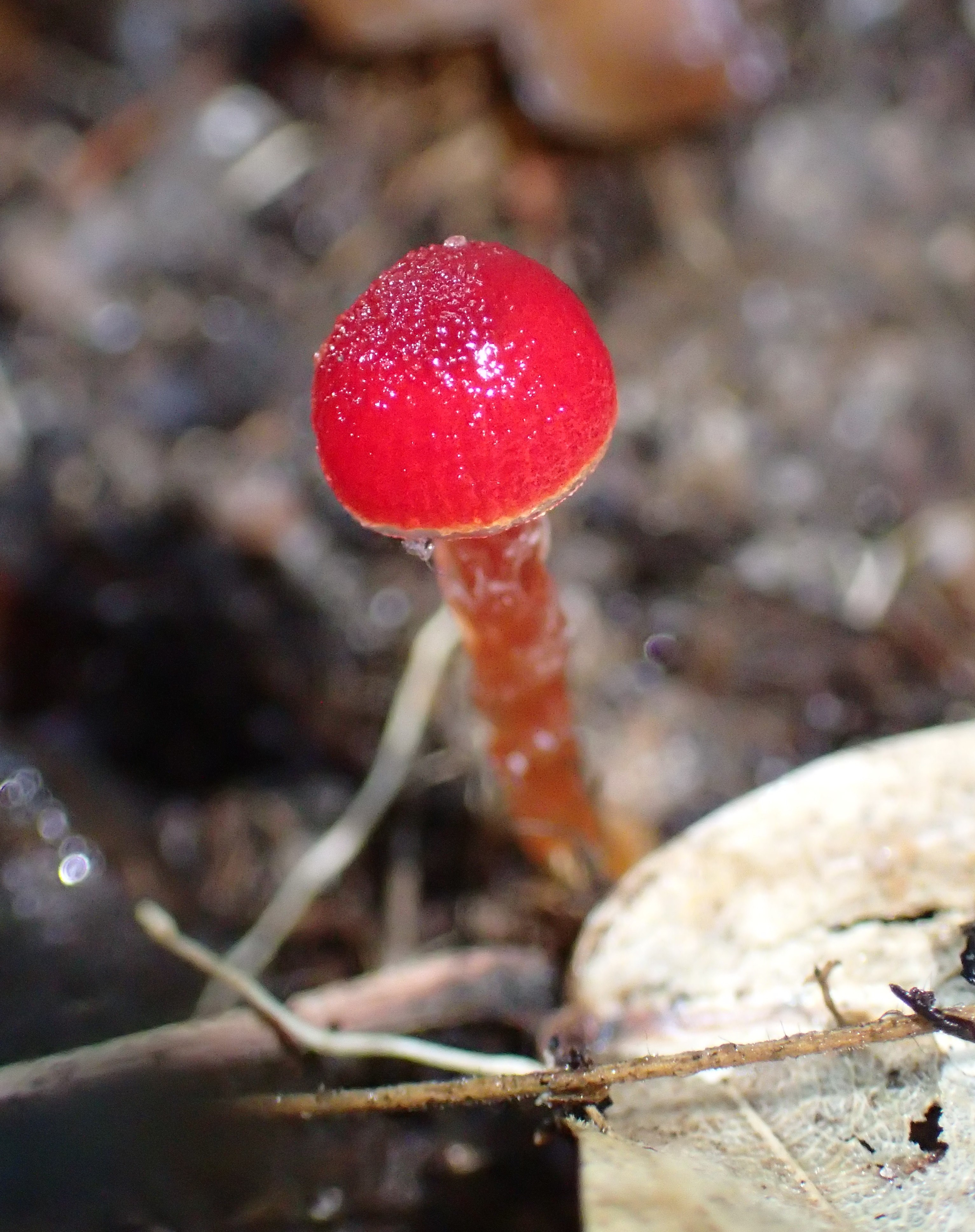

Scientific classification
- Kingdom: Fungi
- Division: Basidiomycota
- Class: Agaricomycetes
- Order: Agaricales
- Family: Hygrophoraceae
- Genus: Hygrocybe
- Species: H. hypohaemacta

Binomial name
- Hygrocybe hypohaemacta (Corner) Pegler

= Hygrocybe hypohaemacta =

Species of mushroom

Hygrocybe hypohaemacta is a species of agaric (gilled fungus) in the family Hygrophoraceae.

== Morphology ==
Pileus is scarlet to scarlet-red, glutinous, often perforate at the center, 1.5–2.7 cm in diameter
