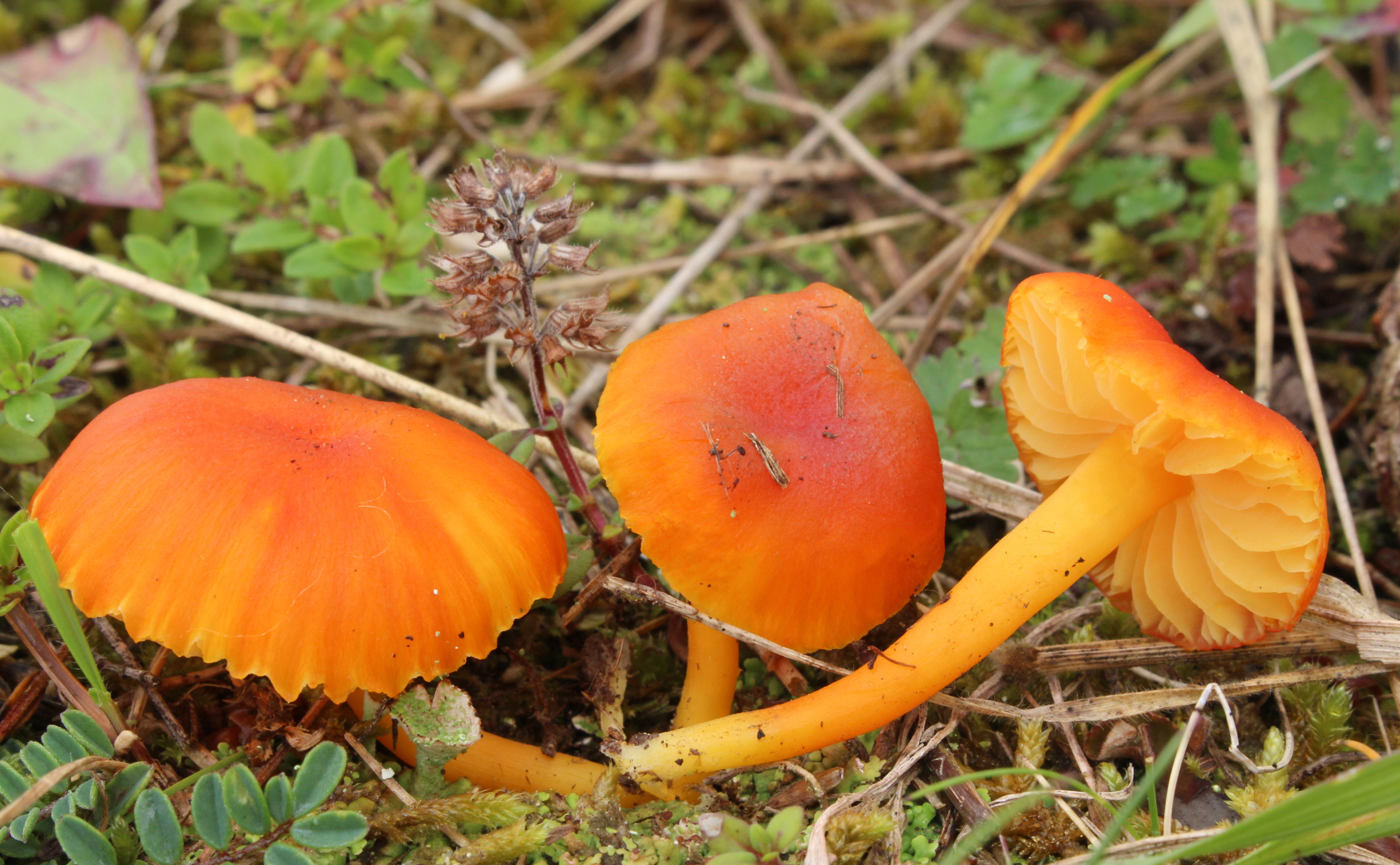

Scientific classification
- Domain: Eukaryota
- Kingdom: Fungi
- Division: Basidiomycota
- Class: Agaricomycetes
- Order: Agaricales
- Family: Hygrophoraceae
- Genus: Hygrocybe
- Species: H. reidii

Binomial name
- Hygrocybe reidii Kühner (1976)

= Hygrocybe reidii =

Species of fungus

Hygrocybe reidii, commonly known as the honey waxcap, is a mushroom of the waxcap genus Hygrocybe.

== Taxonomy ==
It was published by Robert Kühner in 1976, with the specific epithet honouring British mycologist Derek Reid. It is based on a species originally published as Hygrophorus marchii by Giacomo Bresadola in 1928, but with an insufficiently precise description, which later led to conflicting interpretations about the species concept. In 1969, Reid gave a precise description of the fungus common in Europe, but Kühner had a different interpretation of H. marchii, and gave a new name to Reid's concept of the species.

== Description ==
The fungus produces reddish-orange to reddish fruit bodies with dry, smooth caps. The flesh has an odour of honey, particularly when the tissue is rubbed, or when it is drying.

== Distribution ==
It is found in Europe, and reported from eastern North America, although it is uncertain whether the North American population represents the same species.

== See also ==
- List of Hygrocybe species
