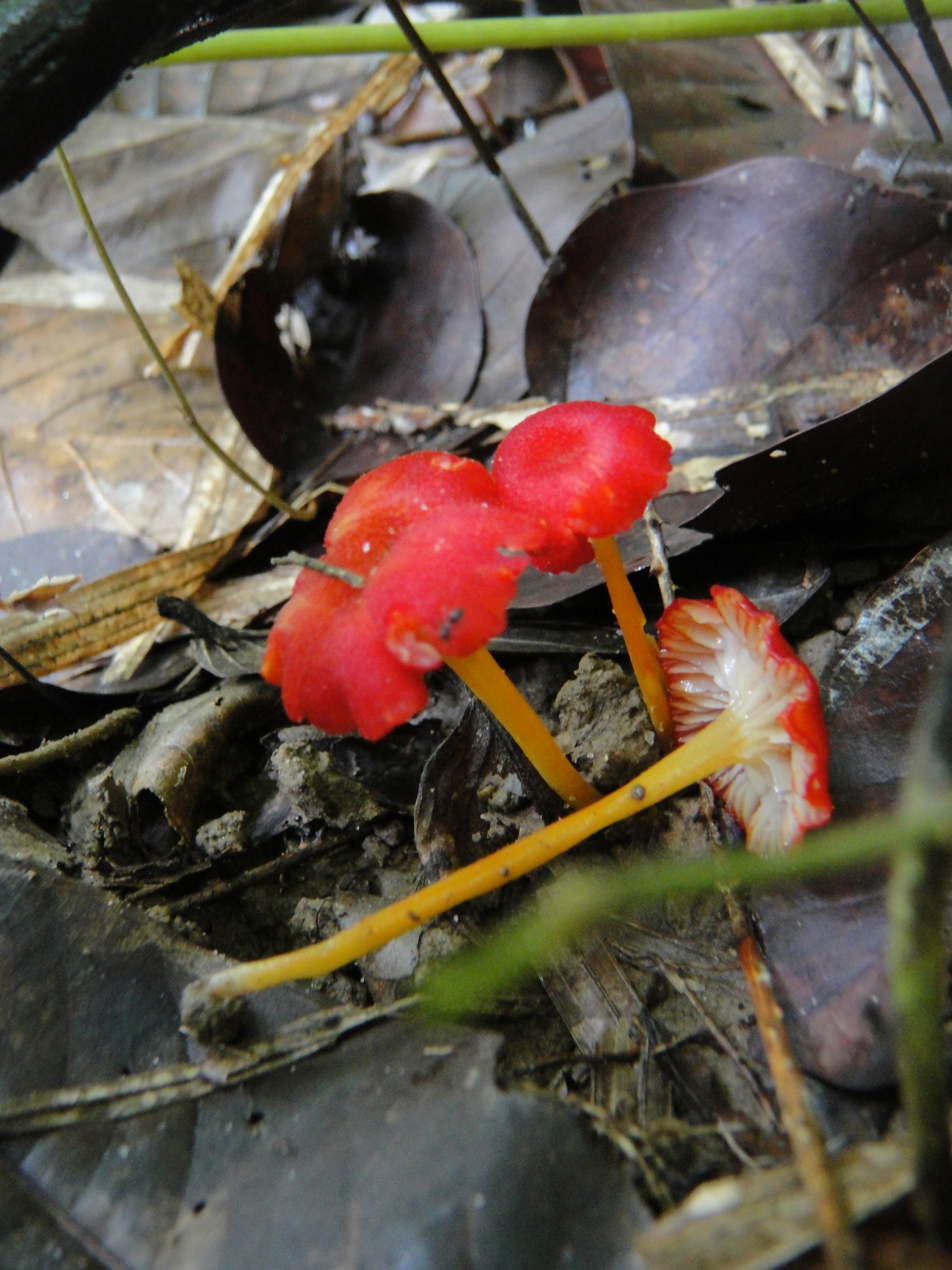

Scientific classification
- Kingdom: Fungi
- Division: Basidiomycota
- Class: Agaricomycetes
- Order: Agaricales
- Family: Hygrophoraceae
- Genus: Hygrocybe
- Species: H. umbilicata

Binomial name
- Hygrocybe umbilicata Iqbal Hosen & Li TH (2016)

= Hygrocybe umbilicata =

Species of fungus

Hygrocybe umbilicata is a species of the fungal family Hygrophoraceae. It is the first of its genus reported for Bangladesh. It was found in Singra Forest, Birganj, Dinajpur district of Bangladesh.
