= Hygrocybe ceracea =

Scientific classification
- Kingdom: Fungi
- Division: Basidiomycota
- Class: Agaricomycetes
- Order: Agaricales
- Family: Hygrophoraceae
- Genus: Hygrocybe
- Species: H. ceracea

Binomial name
- Hygrocybe ceracea (Sowerby) P. Kumm.

Species of fungus

Hygrocybe ceracea
- Mycological characteristics
- Gills on hymenium
- Cap is convex or umbonate
- Hymenium is adnate or decurrent
- Stipe is bare
- Spore print is white
- Edibility is unknown

Hygrocybe ceracea, commonly known as the butter waxcap, is a species of mushroom in the family Hygrophoraceae.

== Description ==
The cap of Hygrocybe ceracea is golden orange and slimy when young, and becomes orange to yellow in age. It is hygrophanous. It is convex and often slightly umbonate. It is about 1-4 centimeters in diameter. The stipe is orange to yellow or golden, and is about 2-4 centimeters long and 5-5 millimeters wide. The gills can be adnate or slightly decurrent, and can be pale yellow, whitish, or orange in color. The spore print is white.

=== Similar species ===
Hygrocybe parvula is variable and can be similar to H. ceracea, but it has an orange-colored stipe and decurrent gills. H. mucronella is also similar but its cap is variable and can be red, yellow, or orange.

== Habitat and distribution ==
Hygrocybe ceracea is often found in grass or moss. It is common in Europe, and occasionally found in North America. It fruits during fall and winter.
