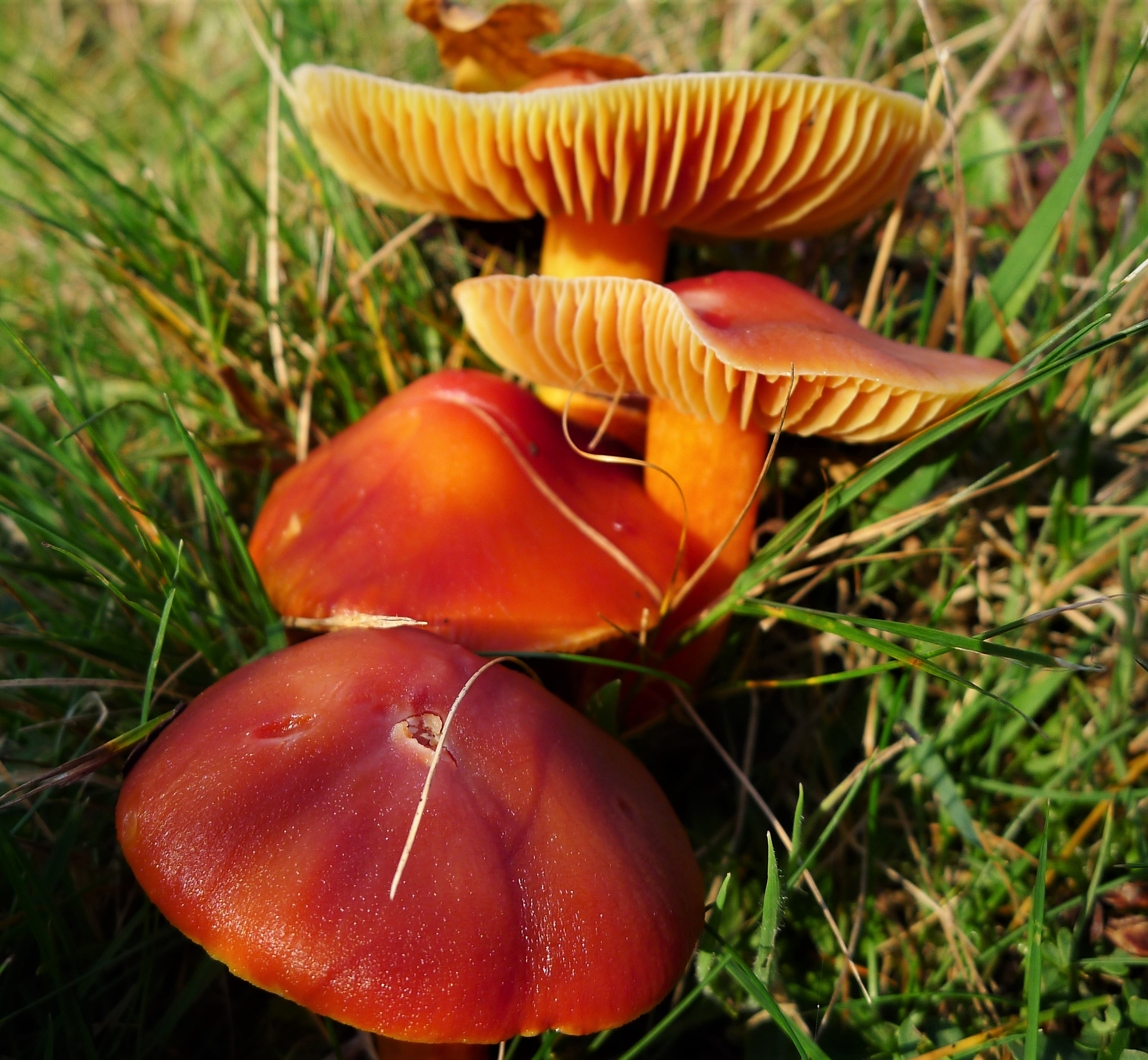
- Hygrocybe punicea, England

Conservation status
- Vulnerable (IUCN 3.1)

Scientific classification
- Kingdom: Fungi
- Division: Basidiomycota
- Class: Agaricomycetes
- Order: Agaricales
- Family: Hygrophoraceae
- Genus: Hygrocybe
- Species: H. punicea

Binomial name
- Hygrocybe punicea (Fr.) P. Kumm. (1871)

Synonyms
- Agaricus puniceus Fr. (1821); Hygrophorus puniceus (Fr.) Fr. (1838); Godfrinia punicea (Fr.) Herink (1958); Pseudohygrocybe punicea (Fr.) Kovalenko (1988)

= Hygrocybe punicea =

Species of fungus

Hygrocybe punicea
- Mycological characteristics
- Gills on hymenium
- Cap is conical or umbonate
- Hymenium is adnexed or free
- Stipe is bare
- Spore print is white
- Edibility is not recommended

Hygrocybe punicea is a species of agaric (gilled mushroom) in the family Hygrophoraceae. It has been given the recommended English name of crimson waxcap.

The species has a European distribution, occurring mainly in agriculturally unimproved grassland. Records from East Asia, North America, and Australia require further research to see if they represent the same species.

Threats to its habitat have resulted in the species being assessed as globally "vulnerable" on the IUCN Red List of Threatened Species. It is not recommended for consumption due to its accumulating cadmium.

== Taxonomy ==
The species was first described in 1821 by Swedish mycologist Elias Magnus Fries as Agaricus puniceus, the Latin "puniceus" meaning "blood red". German mycologist Paul Kummer transferred it to the genus Hygrocybe in 1871.

Recent molecular research, based on cladistic analysis of DNA sequences, has confirmed that Hygrocybe punicea belongs in Hygrocybe sensu stricto.

== Description ==
Basidiocarps are agaricoid, up to 15 centimetres (6 in) tall, the cap convex to broadly umbonate becoming flat, up to 15 cm across. The cap surface is smooth, greasy to viscid, dull dark red to crimson becoming pale yellow to buff in places when dry. The lamellae (gills) are waxy, dark red to buff with purple tints and yellowish margin. The stipe (stem) is smooth but fibrillose and streaky, yellow to orange-red, whitish towards base, lacking a ring. The spore print is white, the spores (under a microscope) smooth, inamyloid, ellipsoid, measuring about 8.5 to 10 by 4.5 to 5.5 μm.

=== Similar species ===
The north temperate H. coccinea (scarlet waxcap) is also scarlet, but normally much smaller and has a non-fibrillose stipe and a cap that is finely nodulose under a lens. The European Hygrocybe splendidissima (splendid waxcap) can be almost as large, but is scarlet, has a dry cap and non-fibrillose stipe, and has a distinct honey smell when rubbed or when drying.

== Distribution and habitat ==
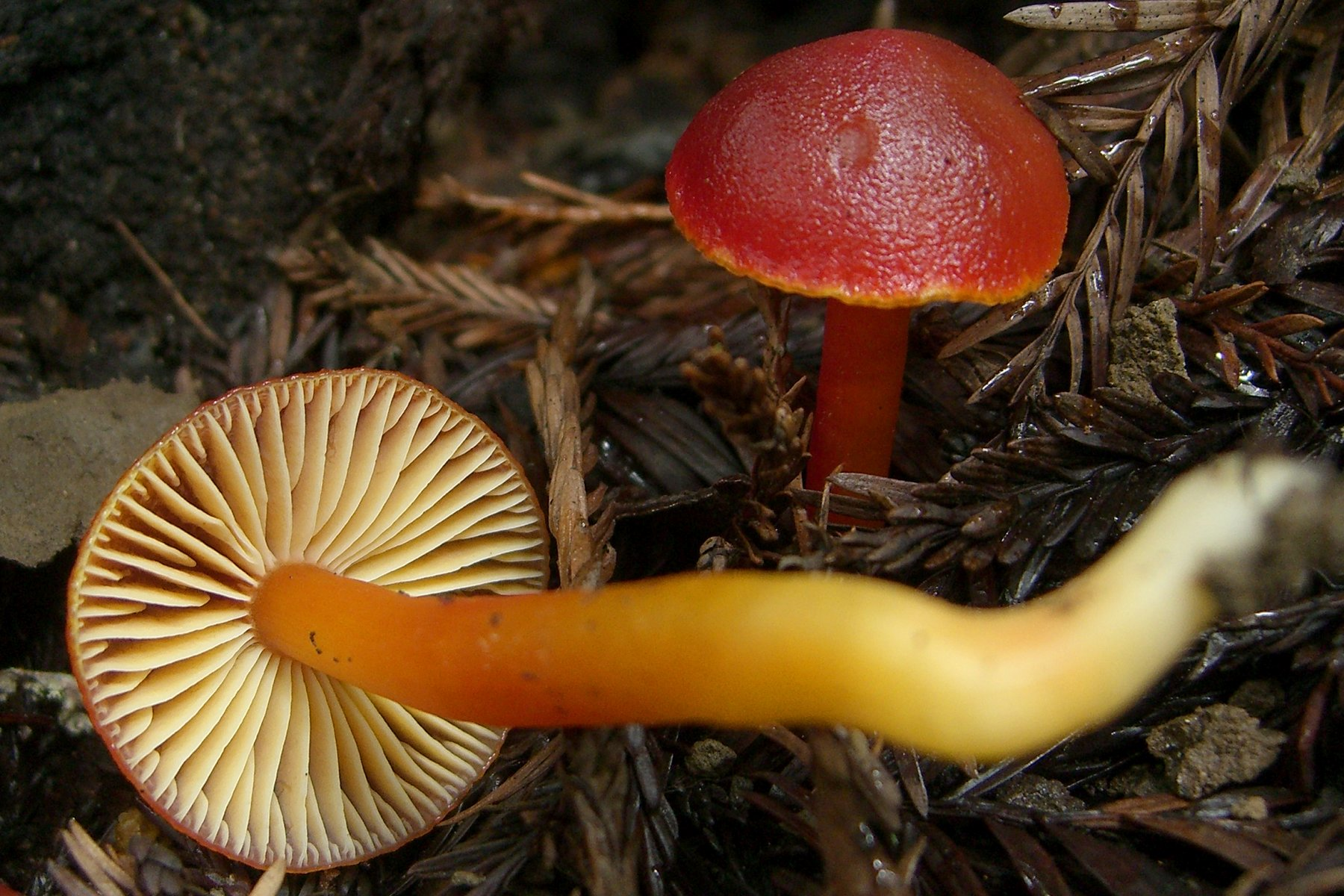
In the California redwoods

The species is widespread but generally rare throughout Europe. Like most other European waxcaps, it occurs in old, agriculturally unimproved, short-sward grassland (pastures and lawns).

Records from East Asia, North America (called scarlet waxy cap and occurring in woodland), and Australia require further research to see if they represent the same species.

== Ecology ==
Recent research suggests waxcaps are neither mycorrhizal nor saprotrophic but may be associated with mosses.

== Conservation ==
Hygrocybe punicea is typical of waxcap grasslands, a declining habitat due to changing agricultural practices. As a result, the species is of global conservation concern and is listed as "vulnerable" on the IUCN Red List of Threatened Species. Hygrocybe punicea also appears on the official or provisional national red lists of threatened fungi in several European countries, including Bulgaria, Croatia, Czech Republic, Denmark, Estonia, Germany, and Sweden.

== Toxicity ==
Though sometimes claimed as edible, the cadmium it accumulates causes poisoning if consumed.

== See also ==
- List of Hygrocybe species
- List of fungi by conservation status
