= Greta Stevenson =

New Zealand mycologist (1911–1990)

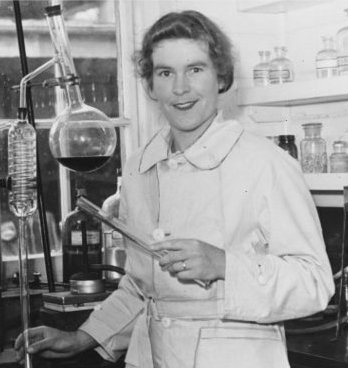
- Greta Stevenson circa 1941
- Born: Greta Barbara Stevenson; 10 June 1911; Auckland, New Zealand
- Died: 18 December 1990 (aged 79)
- Known for: Contributions to mycology
- Scientific career
- Fields: Mycology
- Author abbrev. (botany): G.Stev.

Greta Barbara Stevenson (10 June 1911 – 18 December 1990) was a New Zealand botanist and mycologist. She described many new species of Agaricales (gilled mushrooms).

== Background and education ==
Stevenson was born in Auckland, New Zealand, the oldest of four children of William Stevenson and his wife Grace Mary Scott. William was the managing director of the canned food manufacture Irvine and Stevenson. The Stevenson family moved to Dunedin in 1914, and Greta attended Columba College from 1925 to 1928. She later went on to the University of Otago in 1929, from which she graduated with a BSc in 1932, and then an MSc in botany with first-class honors in 1933. Her thesis was about the life history of the rare parasitic Korthalsella. After graduating she moved to London to attend the Imperial College of Science and Technology, where she completed a PhD in mycology and plant pathology. She married Edgar Cone in 1936, a research student in chemical engineering, with whom she had two children. Returning to New Zealand, while her children were young she was employed with the Wellington City Council as an analyst and a soil microbiologist for the Department of Scientific and Industrial Research soil bureau. During this time she also taught science at several secondary schools. Stevenson was an avid mountaineer, and climbed the east peak of Mount Earnslaw, then a significant accomplishment for an all-woman party.

Stevenson held several appointments: Otago University; Wellington City Council; Cawthron Institute, Nelson; Imperial College, London; Crawley College of Further Education; and King Alfred's College. Stevenson died in London on 18 December 1990, at the age of 79.

In 2017, Stevenson was selected as one of the Royal Society Te Apārangi's "150 women in 150 words", celebrating the contributions of women to knowledge in New Zealand.

== Researches in mycology ==
Stevenson published three books on ferns and fungi, all of which were illustrated with her own drawings. She is known for her five-part series on the Agaricales of New Zealand, published in the Kew Bulletin between 1962 and 1964, in which she described over 150 new species. Stevenson's c. 3,000 collections of New Zealand fungi span two periods in her life. Half of these comprise her 'first herbarium' were collected from 1948 to 1958, and were deposited by Stevenson at the herbarium at Kew Gardens in 1959. The other half are her 'second herbarium', collected during the 1970s to 1980s, another historically important private mycological collection which was incorporated with those of Marie Taylor and Barbara Segedin to form the basis of the New Zealand Fungarium.

== Eponymous taxa ==
- Entoloma stevensoniae E.Horak (1980); a nomen novum for Entoloma niveum G. Stev. (1962)
- Hygrocybe stevensoniae T.W.May & A.E.Wood (1995)

== Selected works ==
- Stevenson, G. (1946–47). The growth of a species of the genus Lilaeopsis in fresh-water reservoirs near Wellington. (PDF) Transactions and Proceedings of the Royal Society of New Zealand 76 (4):581–88.
- ___________. (1954). A Book of Ferns. New York: Henry George Fiedler. 160 pp.
- ___________. (1954). Nitrogen fixation by non-nodulated plants, and by nodulated Coriaria arborea. Nature 182 :1523–1524. doi:10.1038/1821523b0
- ___________. (1962). The Agaricales of New Zealand: I. Boletaceae and Strobilomycetaceae. Kew Bulletin 15 (3): 381–85. (subscription required)
- ___________. (1962). The Agaricales of New Zealand: II. Kew Bulletin 16 (1): 65–74. (subscription required)
- ___________. (1962). The Agaricales of New Zealand: III. Kew Bulletin 16 (2): 227–37. (subscription required)
- ___________. (1963). The Agaricales of New Zealand: IV. Kew Bulletin 16 (3): 373–84. (subscription required)
- ___________. (1964). The Agaricales of New Zealand: V. Kew Bulletin 19 (1): 1–59. (subscription required)
- ___________. (1967). The Biology of Fungi, Bacteria and Viruses. London: Edward Arnold. 202 pp.
- ___________. (1982). Field Guide to Fungi. Canterbury: University of Canterbury. 122 pp. ISBN 978-0900392306
- ___________. (1978). Botanical evidence linking the New Zealand Maoris with New Caledonia and the New Hebrides. Nature 276 :704–705. doi:10.1038/276704a0

== See also ==
- List of mycologists
- Category:Taxa named by Greta Stevenson
