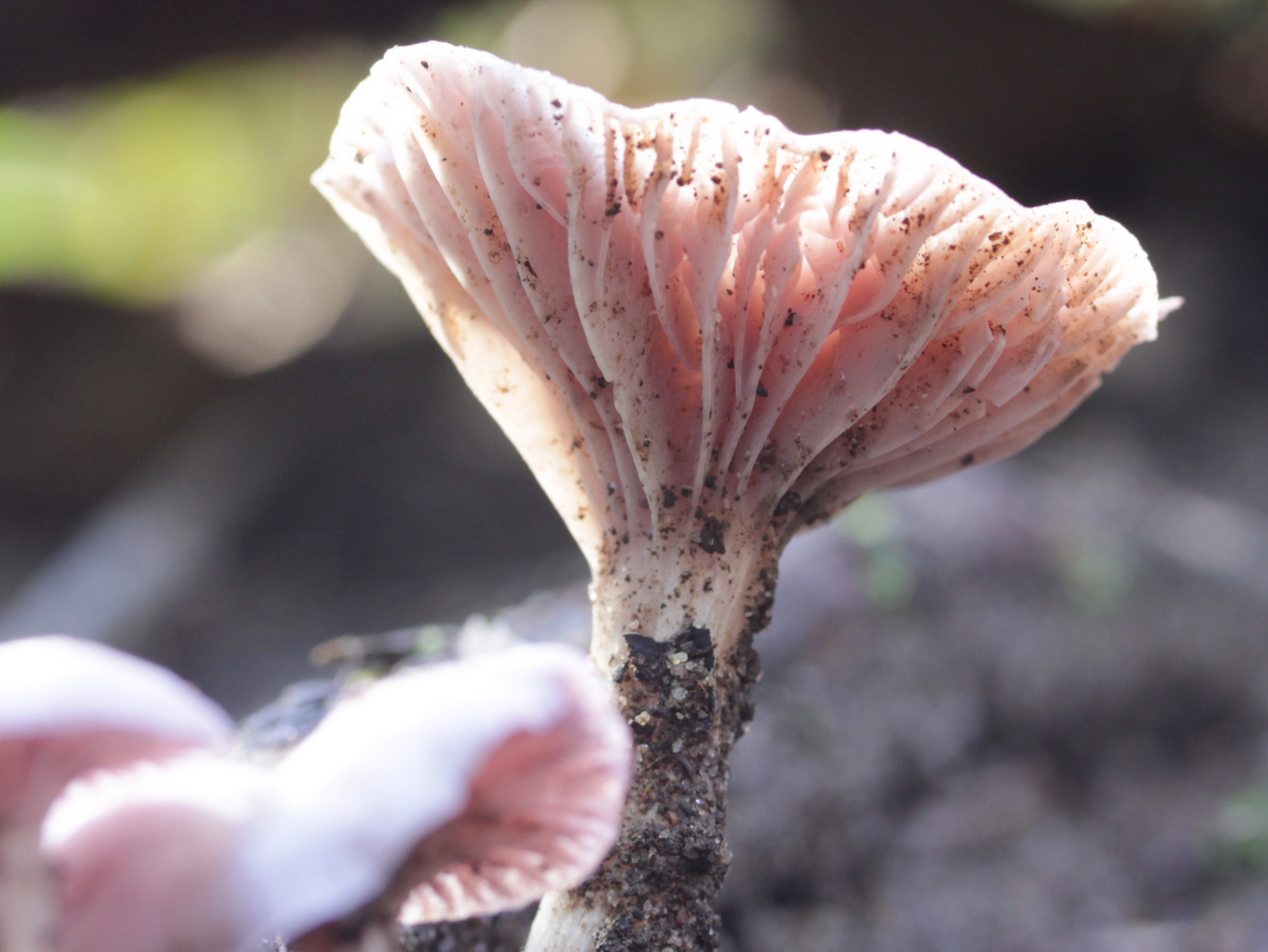
- Ferndale Park, Australia

Conservation status
- Vulnerable (EPBC Act)

Scientific classification
- Domain: Eukaryota
- Kingdom: Fungi
- Division: Basidiomycota
- Class: Agaricomycetes
- Order: Agaricales
- Family: Hygrophoraceae
- Genus: Hygrocybe
- Species: H. reesiae

Binomial name
- Hygrocybe reesiae A.M.Young 1997

= Hygrocybe reesiae =

Species of fungus

Hygrocybe reesiae is a mushroom of the waxcap genus Hygrocybe. It is pink or lilac in colour, and generally grows in moist, shady conditions. A rare species, it is only found near Sydney and Tasmania. It was described in 1997 by mycologist Anthony M. Young.
