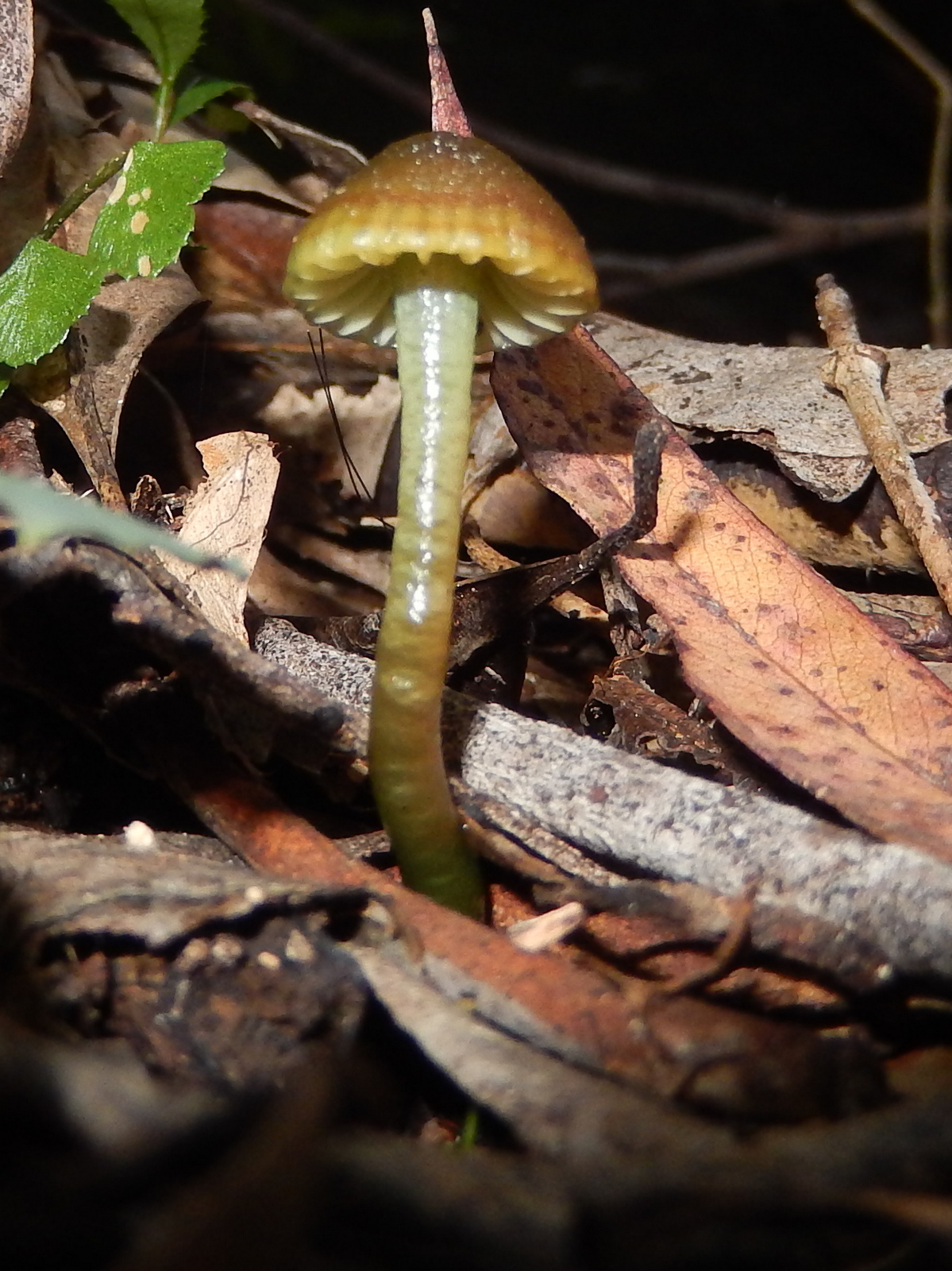
- Ferndale Park, Australia

Scientific classification
- Domain: Eukaryota
- Kingdom: Fungi
- Division: Basidiomycota
- Class: Agaricomycetes
- Order: Agaricales
- Family: Hygrophoraceae
- Genus: Hygrocybe
- Species: H. batesii

Binomial name
- Hygrocybe batesii A.M.Young 1997

= Hygrocybe batesii =

Species of fungus

Hygrocybe batesii is an Australian mushroom of the waxcap genus Hygrocybe. Found growing on soil in moist shaded areas, it was described in 1997 by the mycologist Anthony M. Young.
