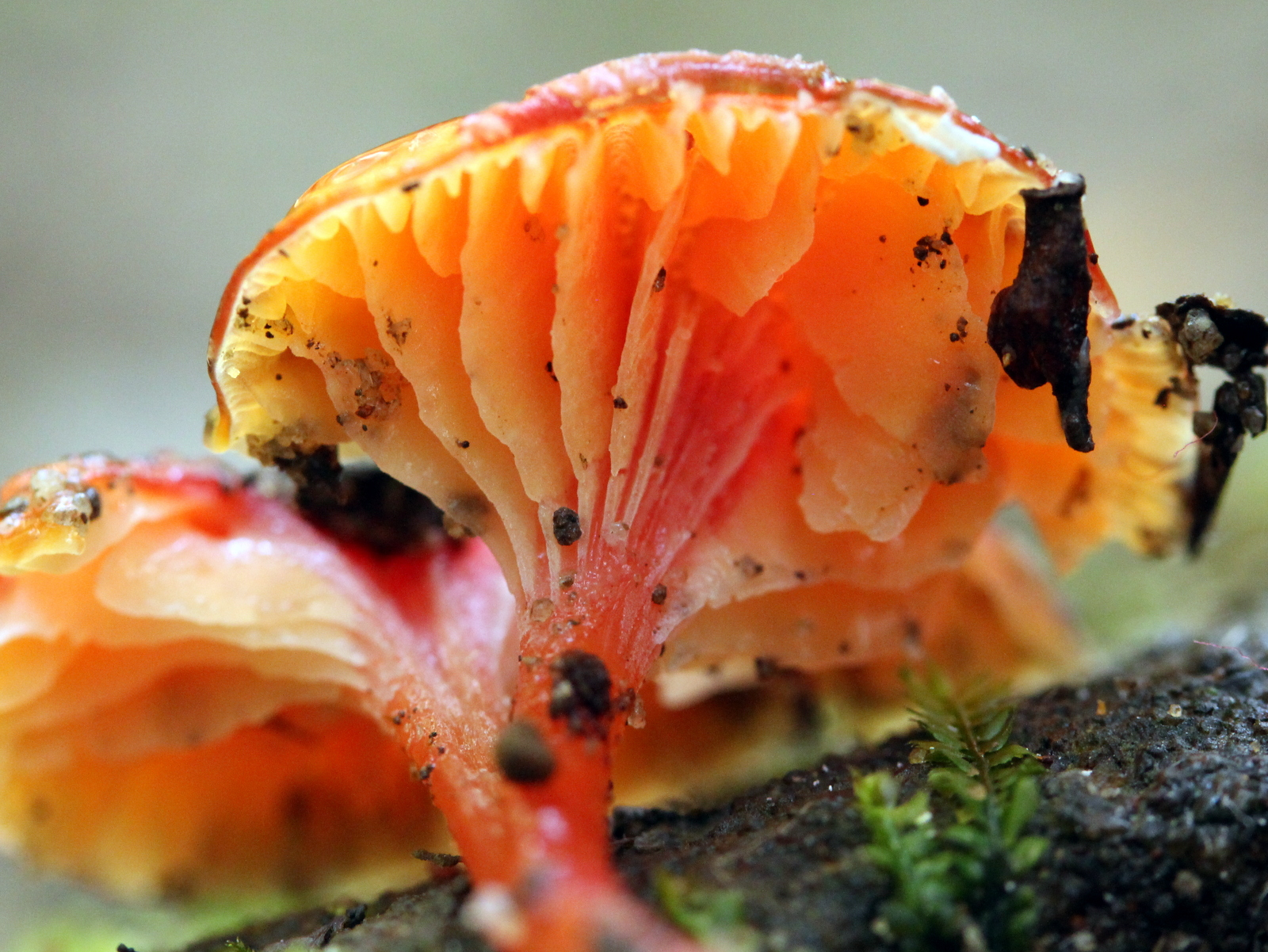
- Ferndale Park, Australia

Conservation status
- Endangered (EPBC Act)

Scientific classification
- Domain: Eukaryota
- Kingdom: Fungi
- Division: Basidiomycota
- Class: Agaricomycetes
- Order: Agaricales
- Family: Hygrophoraceae
- Genus: Hygrocybe
- Species: H. collucera

Binomial name
- Hygrocybe collucera A.M.Young 2001

= Hygrocybe collucera =

Species of fungus

Hygrocybe collucera is a mushroom of the waxcap genus Hygrocybe. It grows in moist, shady conditions. A rare species, it is only found near Sydney. It was described in 2001 by the mycologist Anthony M. Young.
