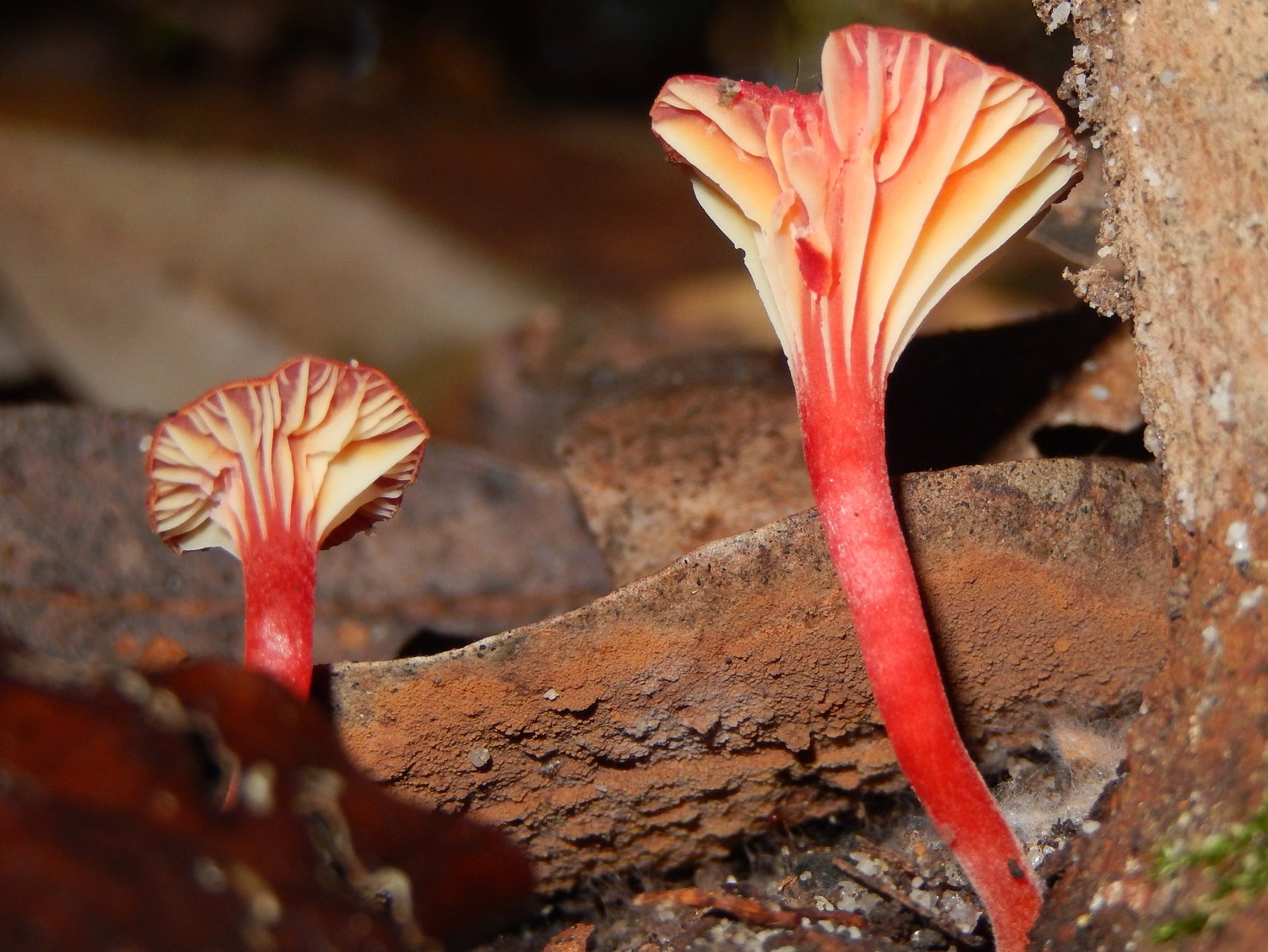
- Ferndale Park, Australia

Scientific classification
- Domain: Eukaryota
- Kingdom: Fungi
- Division: Basidiomycota
- Class: Agaricomycetes
- Order: Agaricales
- Family: Hygrophoraceae
- Genus: Hygrocybe
- Species: H. bolensis

Binomial name
- Hygrocybe bolensis A.M.Young 2000

= Hygrocybe bolensis =

Species of fungus

Hygrocybe bolensis is a mushroom of the waxcap genus Hygrocybe. Generally found growing in soil in moist, shady conditions. It was described in 2000 by the mycologist Anthony M. Young.
