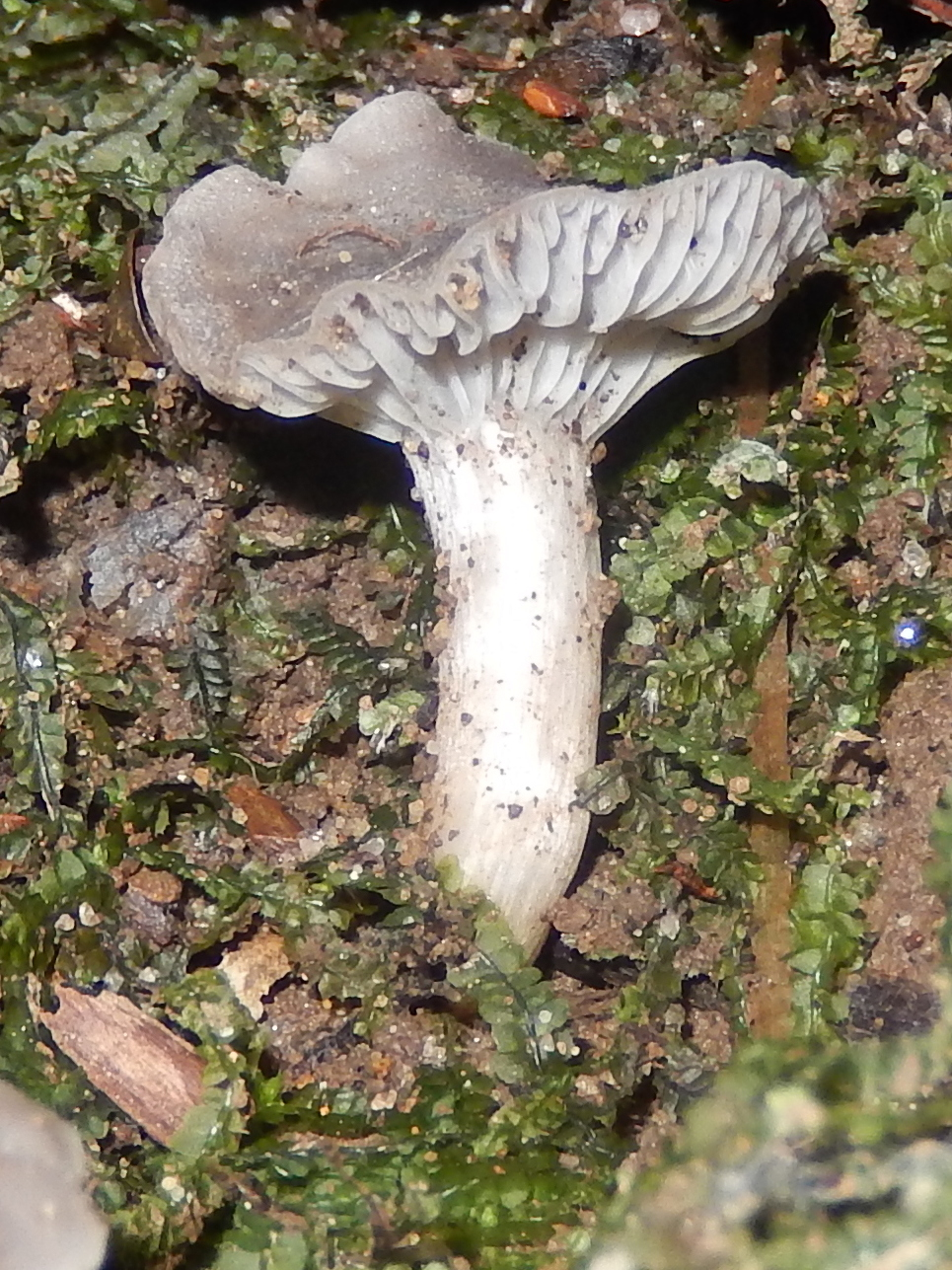
- Ferndale Park, Australia

Conservation status
- Endangered (EPBC Act)

Scientific classification
- Domain: Eukaryota
- Kingdom: Fungi
- Division: Basidiomycota
- Class: Agaricomycetes
- Order: Agaricales
- Family: Hygrophoraceae
- Genus: Hygrocybe
- Species: H. griseoramosa

Binomial name
- Hygrocybe griseoramosa A.M.Young 2001

= Hygrocybe griseoramosa =

Species of fungus

Hygrocybe griseoramosa is a mushroom of the waxcap genus Hygrocybe. It is grey or fawn in colour, and generally grows in moist, shady conditions. A rare species, it is only found near Sydney. Also this species has been found growing in Tasmania. It was described in 2001 by the mycologist Anthony M. Young.
