= Anthony M. Young =

Australian mycologist (born 1943)

- Born: 1943 (age 82–83)
- Scientific career
- Fields: Mycology
- Workplaces: University of Queensland
- Author abbrev. (botany): A.M.Young

Anthony "Tony" M. Young (born 1943) is an Australian mycologist based in Queensland, affiliated with the University of Queensland. He has published several books on fungi as well as a monograph on Australian Hygrophoraceae, resulting from his research on Hygrocybe and related genera. In 2007, he was a co-author of a review of the genus Ramaria in Australia, a work in progress which will see the likely description of 15 new Australian species and increase the total number to 50.

== Described taxa ==
- Amanita muriniflammea Tulloss, A.M.Young & A.E.Wood 1995
- Camarophyllopsis darwinensis A.M.Young 1997
- Camarophyllopsis kearneyi A.M.Young 1999
- Hygrocybe anomala A.M.Young 1997
- Hygrocybe aurantiocampanula A.M.Young 1997
- Hygrocybe aurantipes A.M.Young 1997
- Hygrocybe austrolutea A.M.Young 1997
- Hygrocybe austropratensis A.M.Young 1999
- Hygrocybe badioclavata A.M.Young 1997
- Hygrocybe batesii A.M.Young 1997
- Hygrocybe bolensis A.M.Young 2000
- Hygrocybe boothii A.M.Young 2002
- Hygrocybe bubalinoviscida A.M.Young 1997
- Hygrocybe cerasinomutata A.M.Young 1997
- Hygrocybe chromoxantha A.M.Young 1997
- Hygrocybe collucera A.M.Young, R.Kearney & E.Kearney 2001
- Hygrocybe cystidiorubra A.M.Young 1997
- Hygrocybe dorothyae A.M.Young 1997
- Hygrocybe dromedensis A.M.Young 1997
- Hygrocybe erythrocala A.M.Young 1997
- Hygrocybe franklinensis A.M.Young & A.K.Mills 2002
- Hygrocybe fuhreri A.M.Young 2000
- Hygrocybe griseoramosa A.M.Young, R.Kearney & E.Kearney 2001
- Hygrocybe hayi A.M.Young 1997
- Hygrocybe hypospoda A.M.Young 2000
- Hygrocybe iropus A.M.Young 1997
- Hygrocybe kandora Grgur. & A.M.Young 1997
- Hygrocybe kouskosii A.M.Young 2000
- Hygrocybe lanecovensis A.M.Young 1999
- Hygrocybe leucogloea A.M.Young 1997
- Hygrocybe luteoconica A.M.Young 1997
- Hygrocybe polychroma Bougher & A.M.Young 1997
- Hygrocybe reesiae A.M.Young 1997
- Hygrocybe roseoflavida A.M.Young & A.K.Mills 2002
- Hygrocybe rubrolutea A.M.Young 1997
- Hygrocybe rubronivea A.M.Young 2000
- Hygrocybe saltirivula A.M.Young 2000
- Hygrocybe sanguineocrenulata A.M.Young 1997
- Hygrocybe schistophila A.M.Young 2005
- Hygrocybe siccitatipapillata A.M.Young 1997
- Hygrocybe sylvaria A.M.Young 1997
- Hygrocybe tidbillensis A.M.Young 1997
- Hygrocybe unispora A.M.Young 1997
- Hygrocybe vallomarginata A.M.Young 1997
- Hygrocybe viridiconica A.M.Young 1997
- Hygrocybe viscidibrunnea Bougher & A.M.Young 1997
- Hygrocybe watagensis A.M.Young 1997
- Hygrocybe wilsonensis A.M.Young 1997
- Hygrocybe xanthopoda A.M.Young 2000
- Panaeolopsis nirimbii Watling & A.M.Young 1983
- Panaeolus bernicis A.M.Young 1989
- Ramaria citrinocuspidata A.M.Young & N.A.Fechner 2009

== Publications ==
- Young AM (2005). Fungi of Australia: Hygrophoraceae. CSIRO. ISBN 0-643-09195-5.
- Young AM (2004). A Field Guide to the Fungi of Australia. University of New South Wales Press. ISBN 0-86840-742-9.
- Young Tony (1982). Common Australian Fungi. University of New South Wales Press. ISBN 0-86840-384-9.

== See also ==
- List of mycologists
- Fungi of Australia
