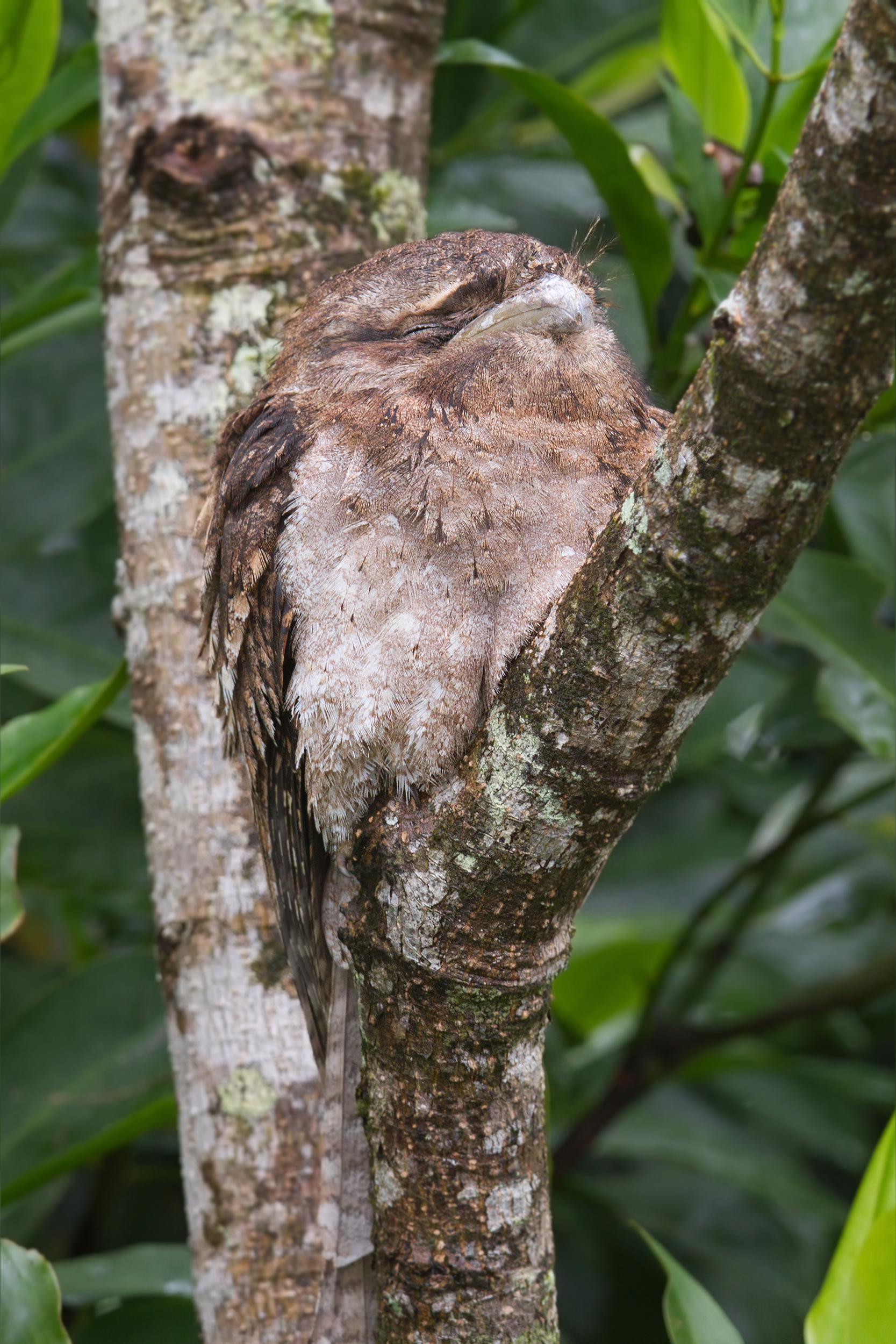

Conservation status
- Least Concern (IUCN 3.1)

Scientific classification
- Kingdom: Animalia
- Phylum: Chordata
- Class: Aves
- Clade: Strisores
- Order: Podargiformes
- Family: Podargidae
- Genus: Podargus
- Species: P. papuensis

Binomial name
- Podargus papuensis Quoy & Gaimard, 1832

= Papuan frogmouth =

Species of bird

The Papuan frogmouth (Podargus papuensis) is a species of bird in the family Podargidae, found in the Aru Islands, New Guinea, and in Cape York Peninsula, Queensland, Australia.

== Taxonomy ==
The species was originally described by zoologist Jean René Constant Quoy and naturalist Joseph Paul Gaimard in 1830.

The three subspecies are P. p. papuensis, P. p. baileyi, and P. p. rogersi.

== Description ==
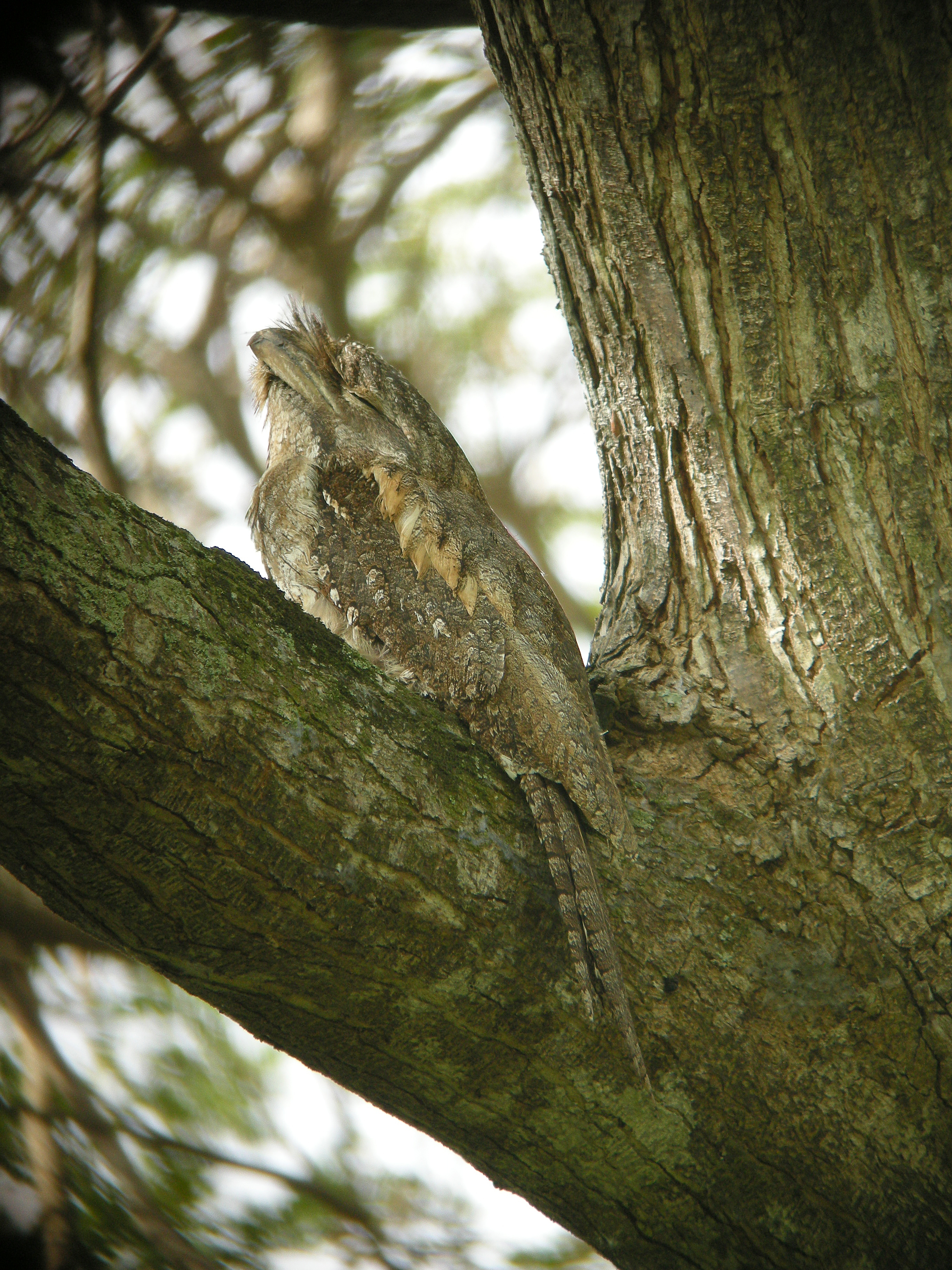
Papuan frogmouth in Papua New Guinea

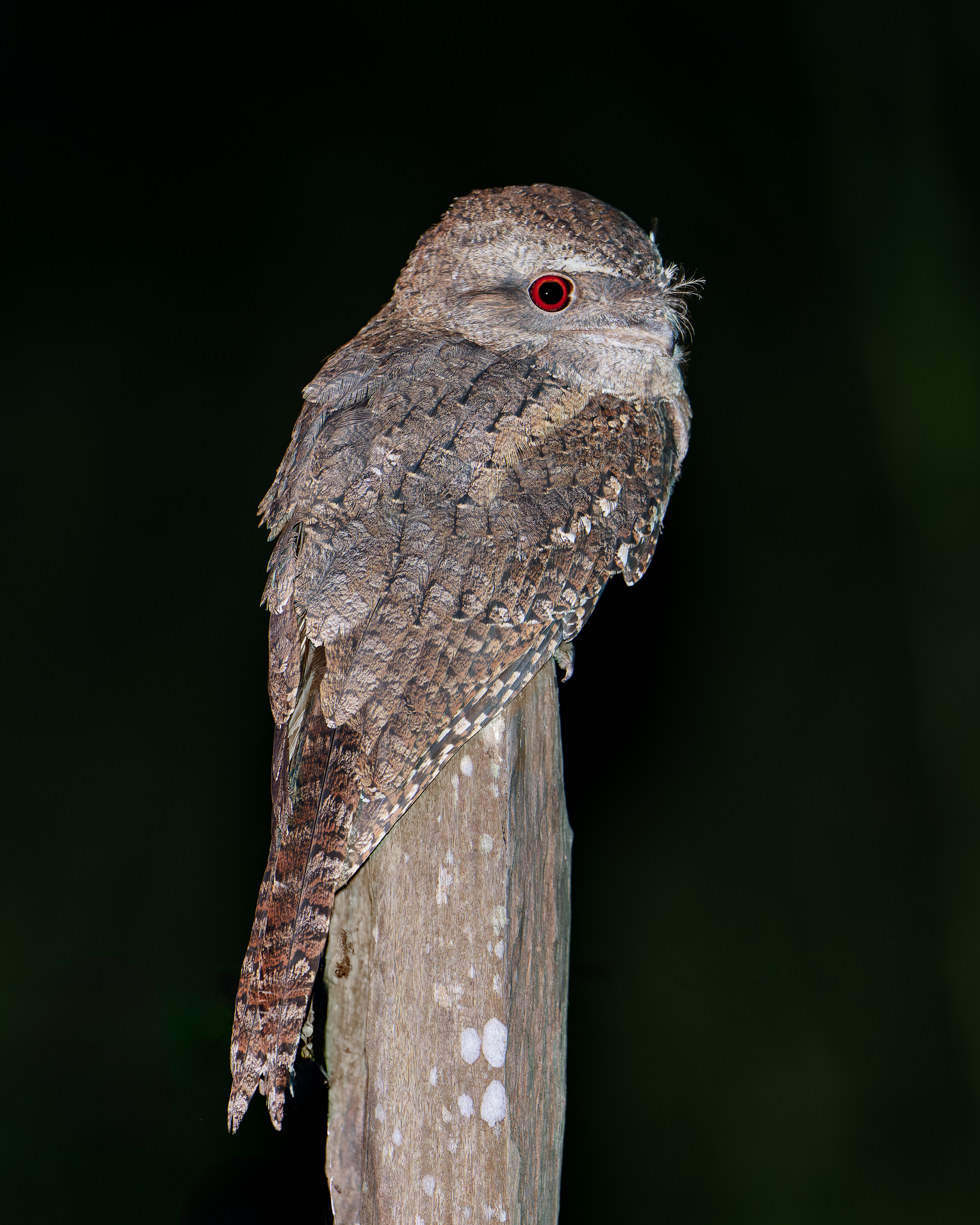
Papuan frogmouth, Julatten, Queensland

The Papuan frogmouth is the largest of frogmouths in terms of length. Average sizes indicate that it only falls behind the Neotropical great potoo and oilbird (if the latter is a true member of the order) among the largest species in the order Caprimulgiformes. On average these birds are about 53 cm (21 in), with a range of 50 to 60 cm (20 to 24 in). This species was found to average 414 g (14.6 oz) in males and 314 g (11.1 oz) in females, with a total range of 290 to 570 g (10 to 20 oz). The tawny frogmouth is smaller on average than this but is capable of reaching higher maximum weights. The Papuan frogmouth has a bulbous bill, red eye, cream eyebrow, long tail and dark wings. The male of the species is slightly larger, darker and marbled in appearance. The female is more rufous in appearance.

P. p. baileyi is smaller, and darker. P. p. rogersi is larger and paler.

Similar species include the tawny frogmouth. The Papuan frogmouth is larger, has red eyes, a longer tail, and darker wings.

== Distribution and habitat ==
It is found in the Aru Islands, New Guinea, and Cape York Peninsula.

This species' natural habitat is subtropical or tropical, moist, lowland forests.

== Behaviour ==
=== Call ===
The call is a resonant 'ooom' or a laughing hoot. It is usually heard after dusk and before dawn.

=== Breeding ===
Breeding takes place from August to January. One or two white eggs are placed in a nest consisting of a few sticks placed in the fork of a branch.

=== Feeding ===
The Papuan frogmouth is strictly nocturnal. It hunts for large insects on the ground from dusk. On occasion, it also takes small reptiles, amphibians, or birds as prey.

The Papuan frogmouth may secrete a substance in its mouth that attracts flies. According to a number of observers, it is able to wait with its mouth open and flies enter to investigate the odor.
