= Hygrocybe saltirivula =

Scientific classification
- Domain: Eukaryota
- Kingdom: Fungi
- Division: Basidiomycota
- Class: Agaricomycetes
- Order: Agaricales
- Family: Hygrophoraceae
- Genus: Hygrocybe
- Species: H. saltirivula

Binomial name
- Hygrocybe saltirivula A.M.Young (2000)

Species of fungus

Hygrocybe saltirivula (originally spelled saltorivula) is a mushroom of the waxcap genus Hygrocybe. Described by mycologist Anthony M. Young in 2000, it is found in Australia, where it grows in deep moss in eucalypt woodland.

== See also ==
- List of Hygrocybe species
