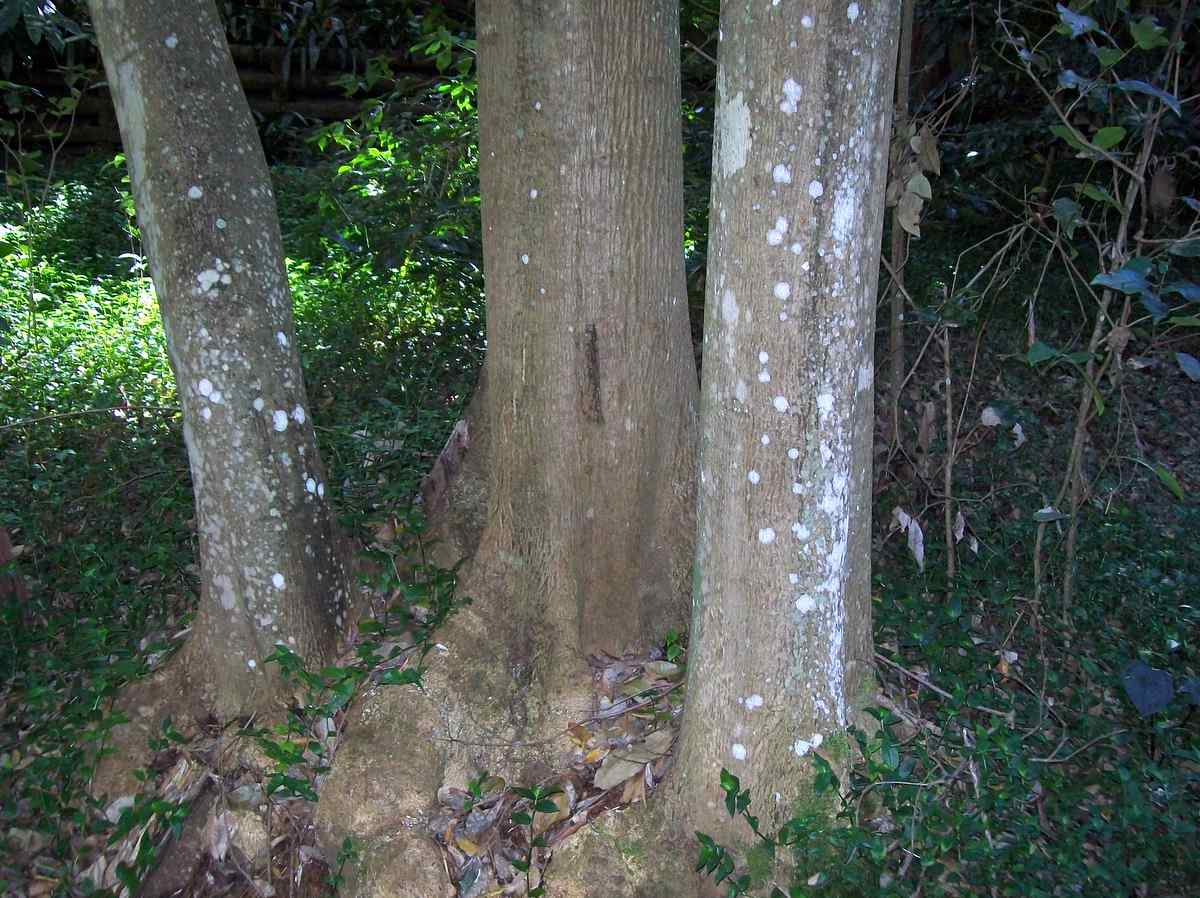
- Schizomeria ovata

Scientific classification
- Kingdom: Plantae
- Clade: Tracheophytes
- Clade: Angiosperms
- Clade: Eudicots
- Clade: Rosids
- Order: Oxalidales
- Family: Cunoniaceae
- Genus: Schizomeria; D.Don

= Schizomeria =

Genus of plants

Schizomeria is a genus with 10 species of plants in the family Cunoniaceae. There are two species in Australia. Others occur in New Guinea, the Moluccas and the Solomon Islands. The fruit is a fleshy drupe.

The name is from the Greek, meaning I cut a portion of. Referring to the petals which appear as if parts have been cut from the petal tips.

== Selected species ==
- Schizomeria ovata
