= Hygrocybe kula =

Scientific classification
- Domain: Eukaryota
- Kingdom: Fungi
- Division: Basidiomycota
- Class: Agaricomycetes
- Order: Agaricales
- Family: Hygrophoraceae
- Genus: Hygrocybe
- Species: H. kula

Binomial name
- Hygrocybe kula Grgur. (1997)

Species of fungus

Hygrocybe kula is a mushroom of the waxcap genus Hygrocybe found only in Royal National Park and Lane Cove Bushland Park. It was described in 1997 by mycologist Cheryl Grgurinovic.

== See also ==
- List of Hygrocybe species
