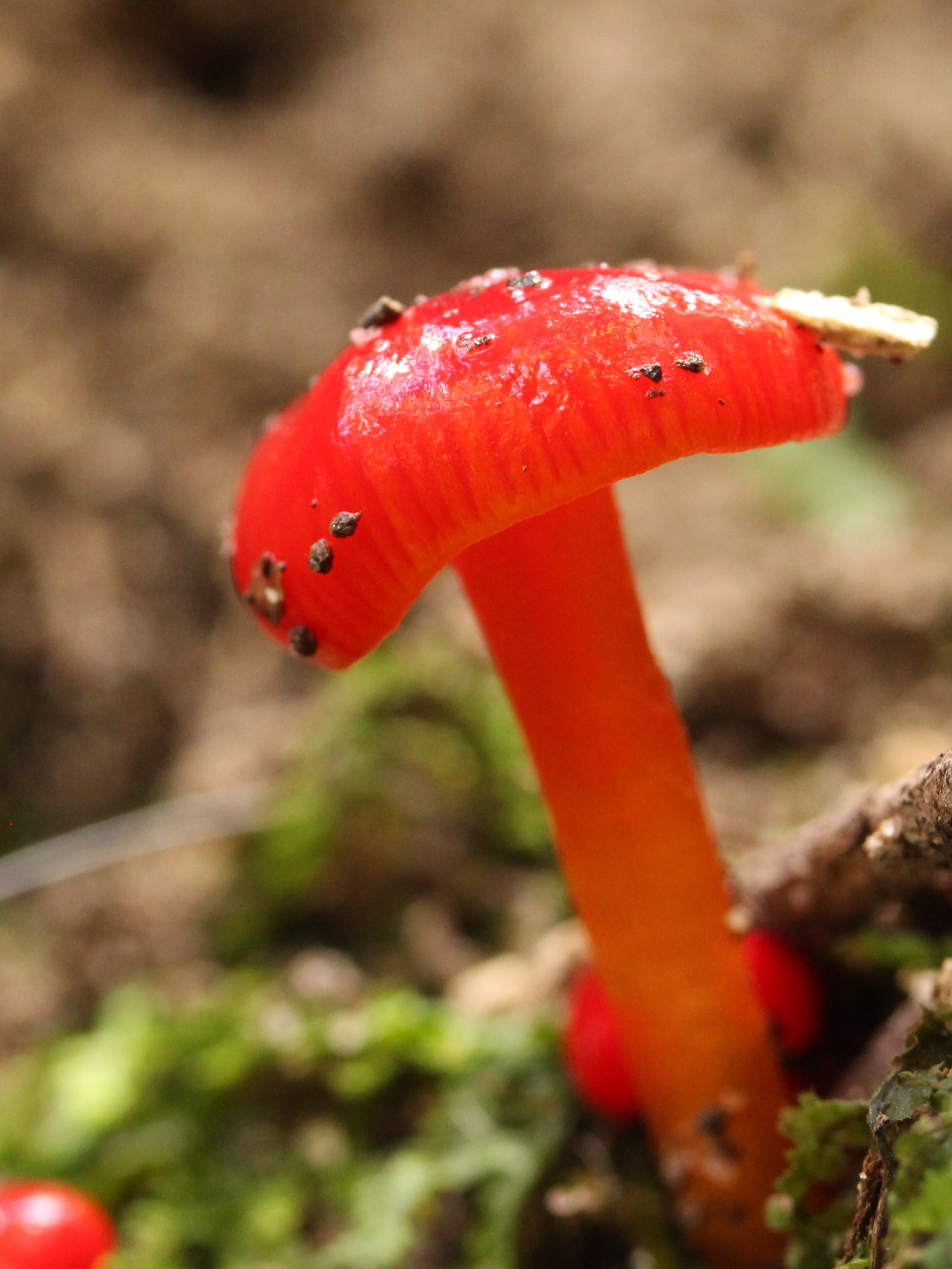

Scientific classification
- Domain: Eukaryota
- Kingdom: Fungi
- Division: Basidiomycota
- Class: Agaricomycetes
- Order: Agaricales
- Family: Hygrophoraceae
- Genus: Hygrocybe
- Species: H. erythrocala

Binomial name
- Hygrocybe erythrocala A.M.Young, 1997

= Hygrocybe erythrocala =

Species of plant

Hygrocybe erythrocala is a mushroom of the waxcap genus Hygrocybe. It grows in moist, shady conditions near Sydney, Australia. The cap is viscid and glossy with striations; this species lacks decurrent gills. It was described in 1997 by the mycologist Anthony M. Young.
