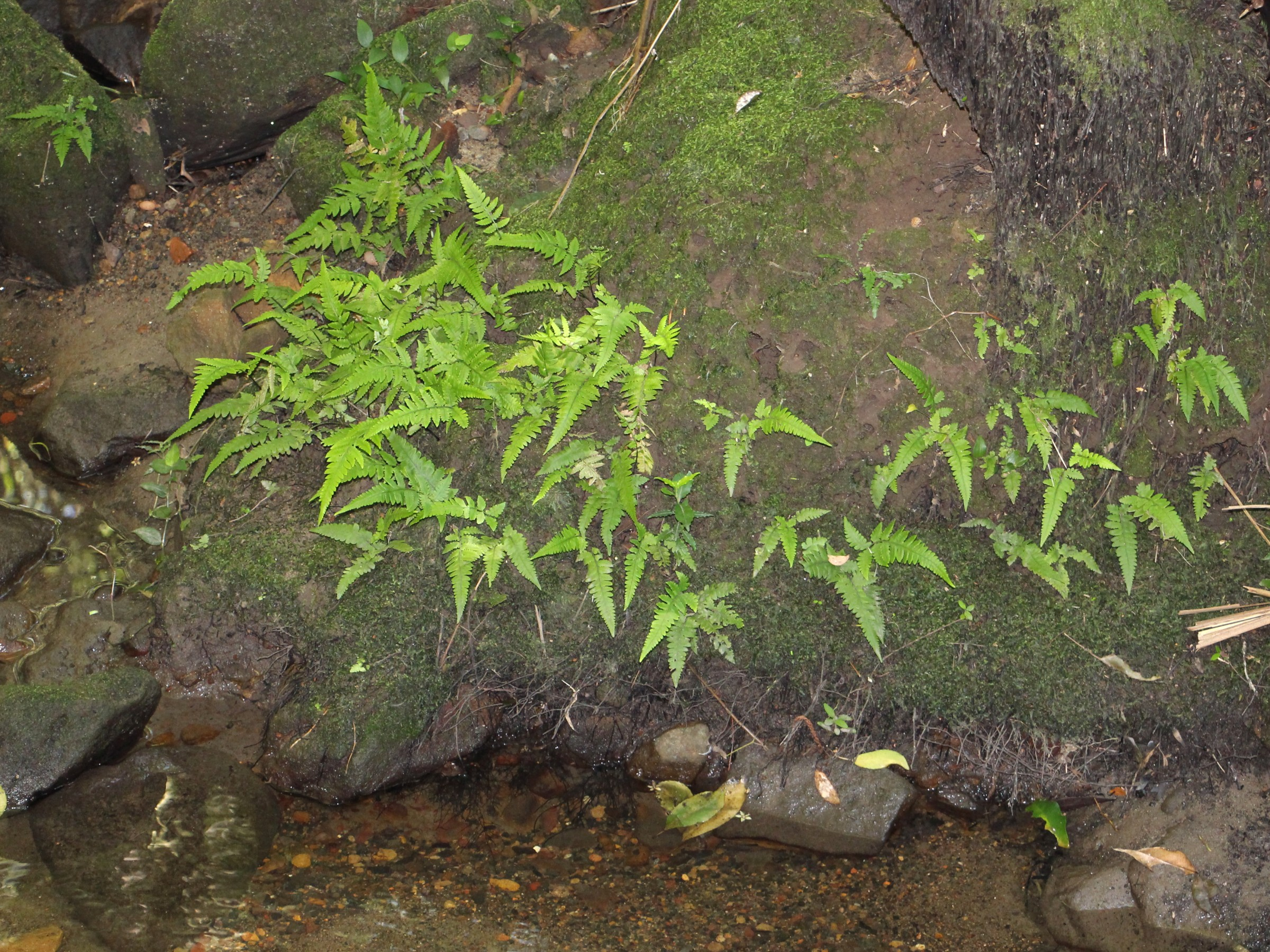
- Japanese lady ferns at Ferndale Park, Sydney

Scientific classification
- Kingdom: Plantae
- Clade: Tracheophytes
- Division: Polypodiophyta
- Class: Polypodiopsida
- Order: Polypodiales
- Suborder: Aspleniineae
- Family: Athyriaceae
- Genus: Deparia
- Species: D. petersenii
- Subspecies: D. p. subsp. congrua

Trinomial name
- Deparia petersenii subsp. congrua (Brack.) M.Kato

Synonyms
- Lunathyrium japonicum (Thunb.) Sa.Kurata; Diplazium congruum Brack.; Lunathyrium petersenii (Kunze) H.Ohba; Lunathyrium petersenii subsp. congrua

= Deparia petersenii subsp. congrua =

Subspecies of fern

Deparia petersenii subsp. congrua, commonly known as Japanese lady fern, is a fern found in Australia, Malesia and Polynesia. It may be found in a variety of different habitats, such as close to stream banks, and damp rock faces and crevices, often in a large colony.
