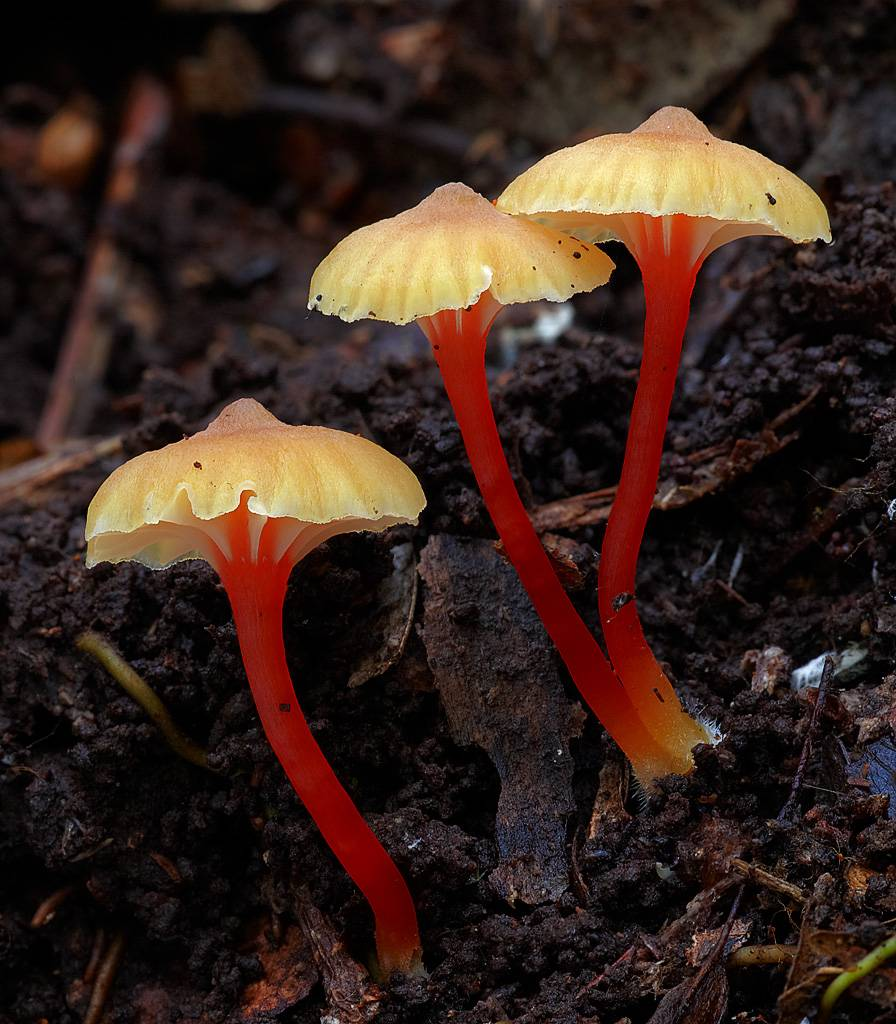

Scientific classification
- Domain: Eukaryota
- Kingdom: Fungi
- Division: Basidiomycota
- Class: Agaricomycetes
- Order: Agaricales
- Family: Hygrophoraceae
- Genus: Hygrocybe
- Species: H. anomala

Binomial name
- Hygrocybe anomala A.M.Young (1997)

= Hygrocybe anomala =

Species of fungus

Hygrocybe anomala is a mushroom of the waxcap genus Hygrocybe. Known from Australia, it was first described scientifically by A.M. Young in 1997.
