= Lane Cove Bushland Park =

Forest near Sydney, Australia

Coordinates: 33°49.369′S 151°10.754′E

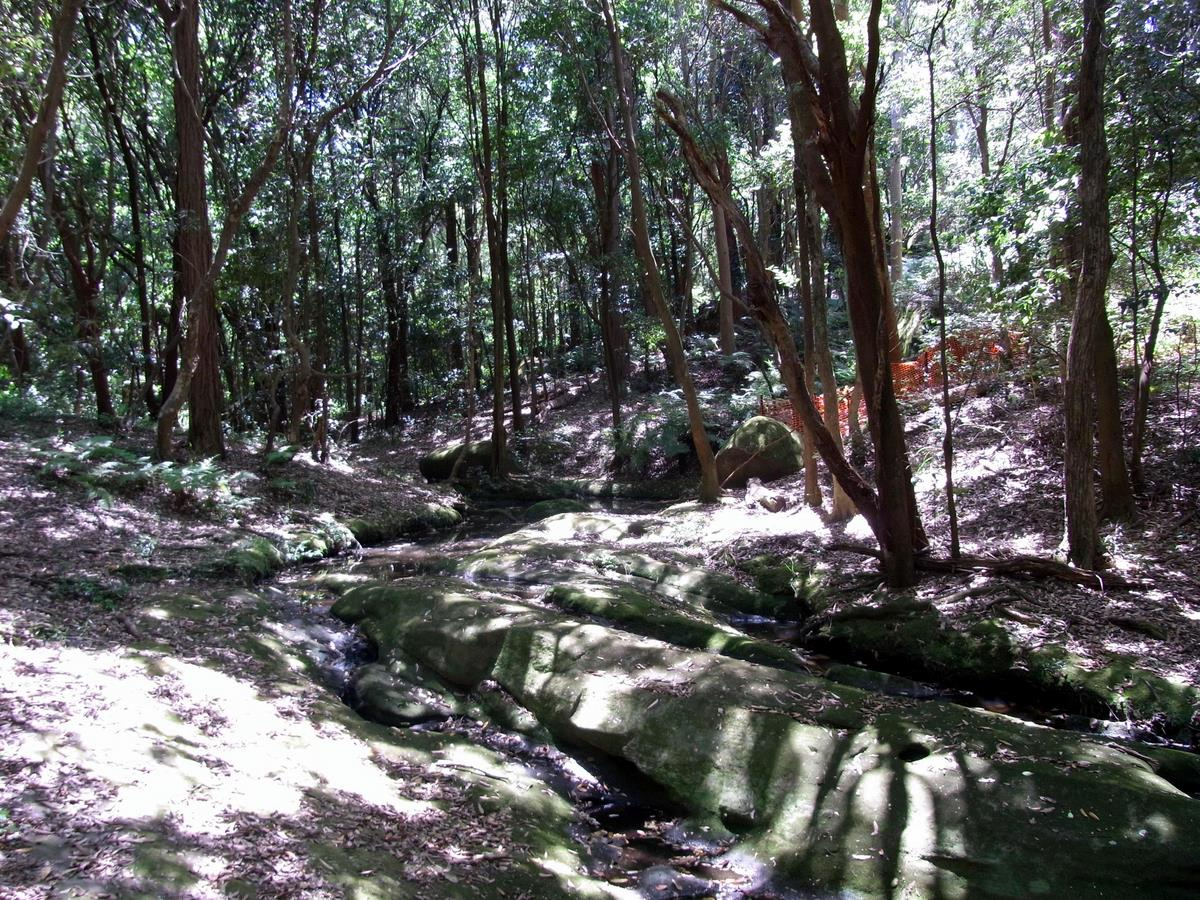
the creek at Bushland Park

Lane Cove Bushland Park is located in suburban Lane Cove, 5 kilometres from the centre of Sydney, Australia. It is regarded as one of the more interesting areas of fungi in the country. In the year 2000, Bushland Park was placed on the Register of the National Estate, under the Australian Heritage Commission Act, 1975. Average annual rainfall is 1220 mm. Soils are moderately fertile, based on Hawkesbury sandstone and Ashfield Shale. The climate is warm and humid.

== Fungi ==
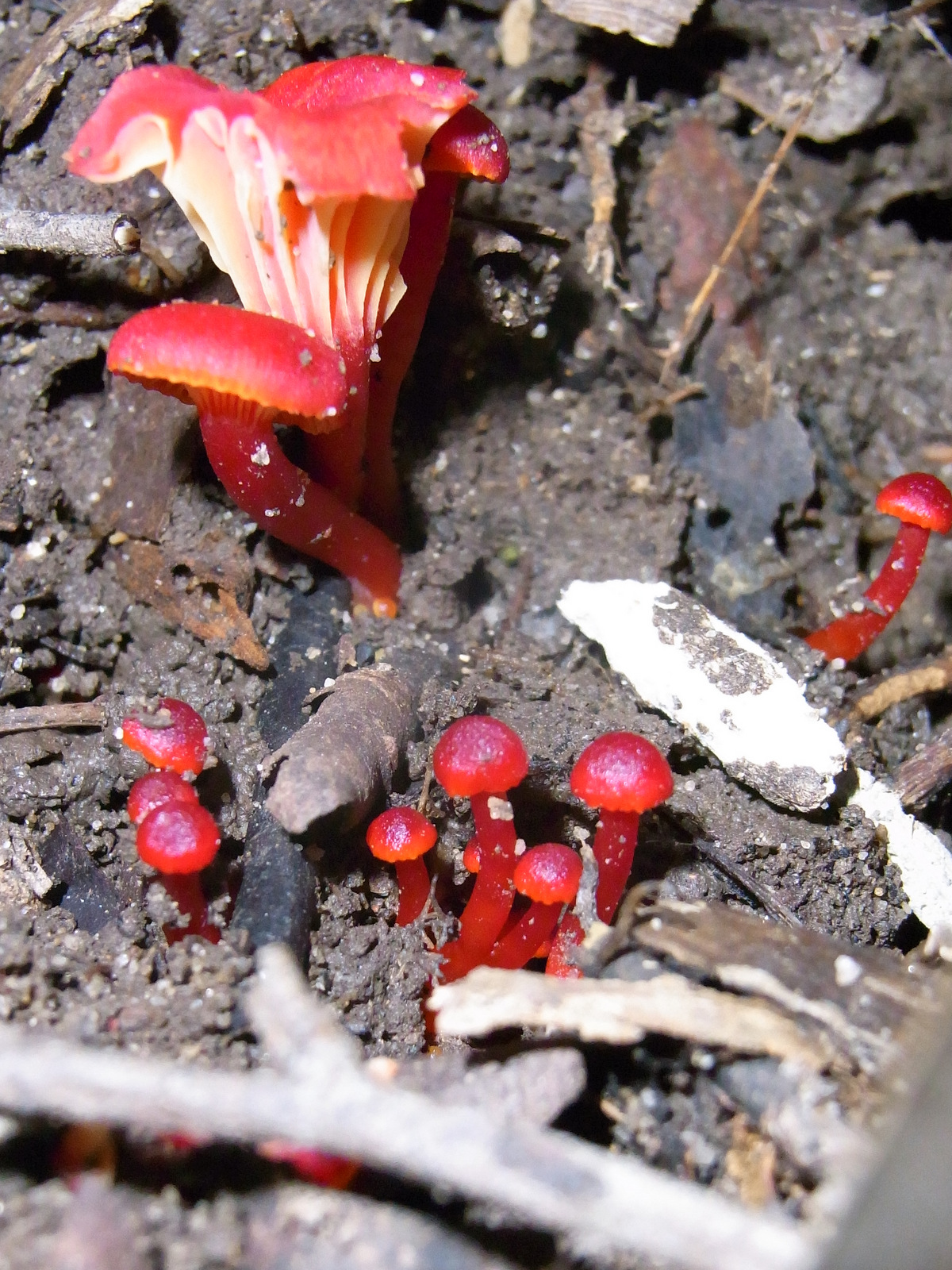
rare fungi at Bushland Park

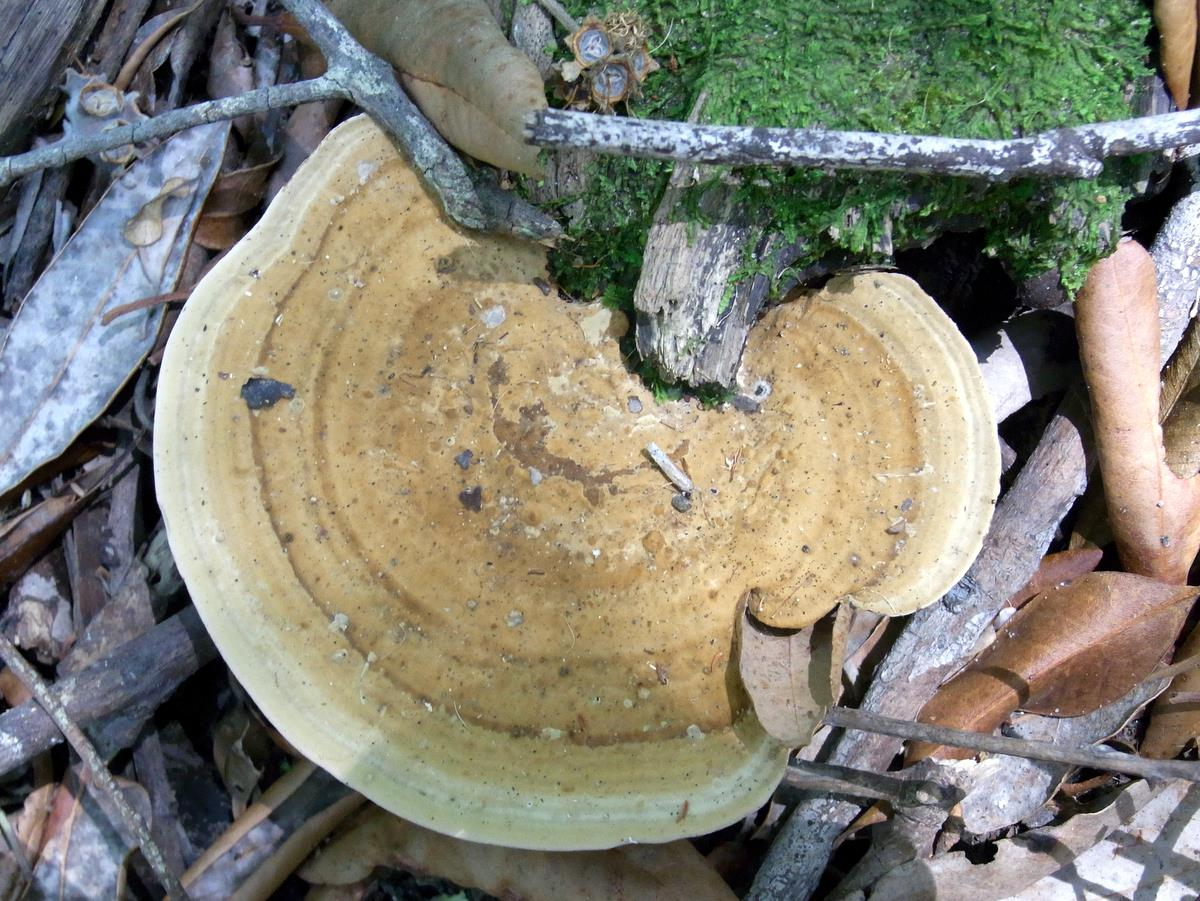
fungus at Bushland Park

This reserve contains the highest number of the family Hygrophoraceae found anywhere in Australia. With some species listed as threatened. Lane Cove Bushland Park is home to a species of fungus, Hygrocybe lanecovensis, which is found nowhere else. The species was discovered in the 1990s. Common fungal species include Auricularia auricular-judae, Nidula emodensis, Trametes versicolor, Mycena clarkeana, and Mycena viscidocruenta.

== Flora ==
Trees such as blackbutt, Sydney red gum and turpentine dominate the higher areas. It is not considered part of the Blue Gum High Forest or the Sydney Turpentine-Ironbark Forest.

Gully rainforest contains trees such as cheese tree, lilly pilly, ironwood and pittosporum. Other interesting rainforest plants include tree heath, native crabapple, milk vine, orange bark, jungle brake and brittlewood. There is a disputed record of the prickly tree fern in a creekside gully.

== Fauna ==
Ring-tail possums, brushtail possums and grey-headed flying foxes are common. Birds such as rainbow lorikeets, Australian king parrots, crimson rosellas, currawongs, koel, tawny frogmouth and powerful owl are some of the many found here.

== Bush Regeneration ==
This area has a high conservation status, and conservation work is in progress. The weed trad is particularly troublesome. The shady areas form excellent habitats for fungi and rainforest plants, but disturbed areas are suited to invasive weeds.
