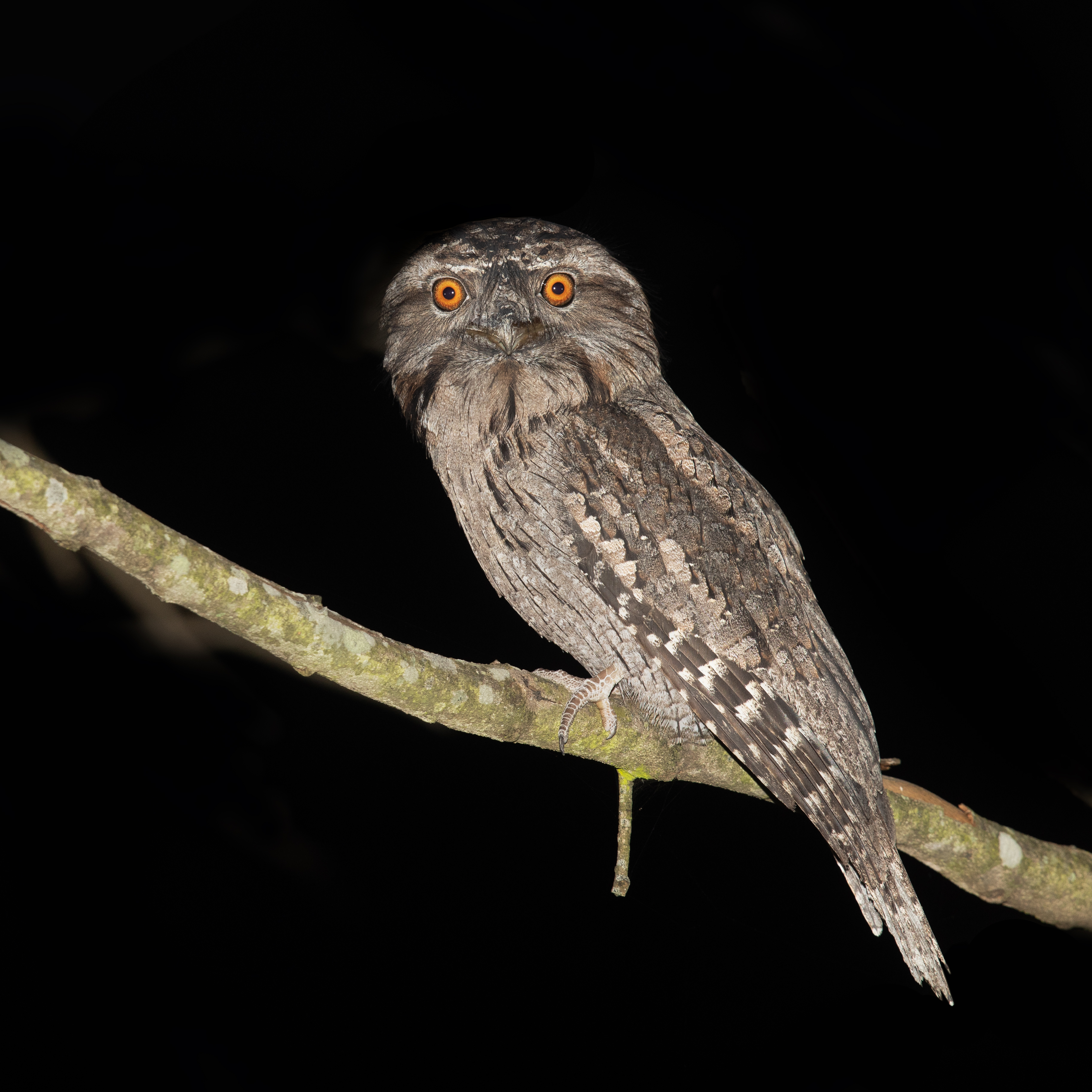

Conservation status
- Least Concern (IUCN 3.1)

Scientific classification
- Kingdom: Animalia
- Phylum: Chordata
- Class: Aves
- Order: Podargiformes
- Family: Podargidae
- Genus: Podargus
- Species: P. strigoides

Binomial name
- Podargus strigoides (Latham, 1801)

= Tawny frogmouth =

Species of bird

The tawny frogmouth (Podargus strigoides) is a species of frogmouth native to the Australian mainland and Tasmania and found throughout. It is a big-headed, stocky bird often mistaken for an owl due to its nocturnal habits and similar colouring.

== Names ==
In the past, it was sometimes mistakenly called a mopoke or mopawk, a name used for the Australian boobook, the call of which is often confused with that of the tawny frogmouth.

== Taxonomy ==
The tawny frogmouth was first described in 1801 by English naturalist John Latham. Its specific epithet is derived from Latin strix "owl" and oides "form". Tawny frogmouths belong to the frogmouth genus Podargus, which includes the two other species of frogmouths found within Australia, the marbled frogmouth and the Papuan frogmouth. The frogmouths form a well-defined group within the order Caprimulgiformes. Although related to owls, their closest relatives are the oilbirds, potoos, owlet-nightjars, and true nightjars. The earliest fossil evidence of frogmouths, from the Eocene, implies that they diverged from their closest relatives during the early Tertiary. Three subspecies of the tawny frogmouth are currently recognised:

- P. s. phalaenoides is found throughout Northern Australia southwards to the Great Sandy Desert, Barkly Tableland, and the Gulf of Carpentaria in Queensland.
- P. s. brachypterus is found in Western Australia northward to the Great Sandy Desert, north-eastward to the Channel Country of Queensland, and south-eastward to the Murray Mallee in Victoria.
- P. s. strigoides is found in eastern and south-eastern Australia from north of Cooktown, westward to the inland fringes of the Great Dividing Range, and in Tasmania.

== Description ==
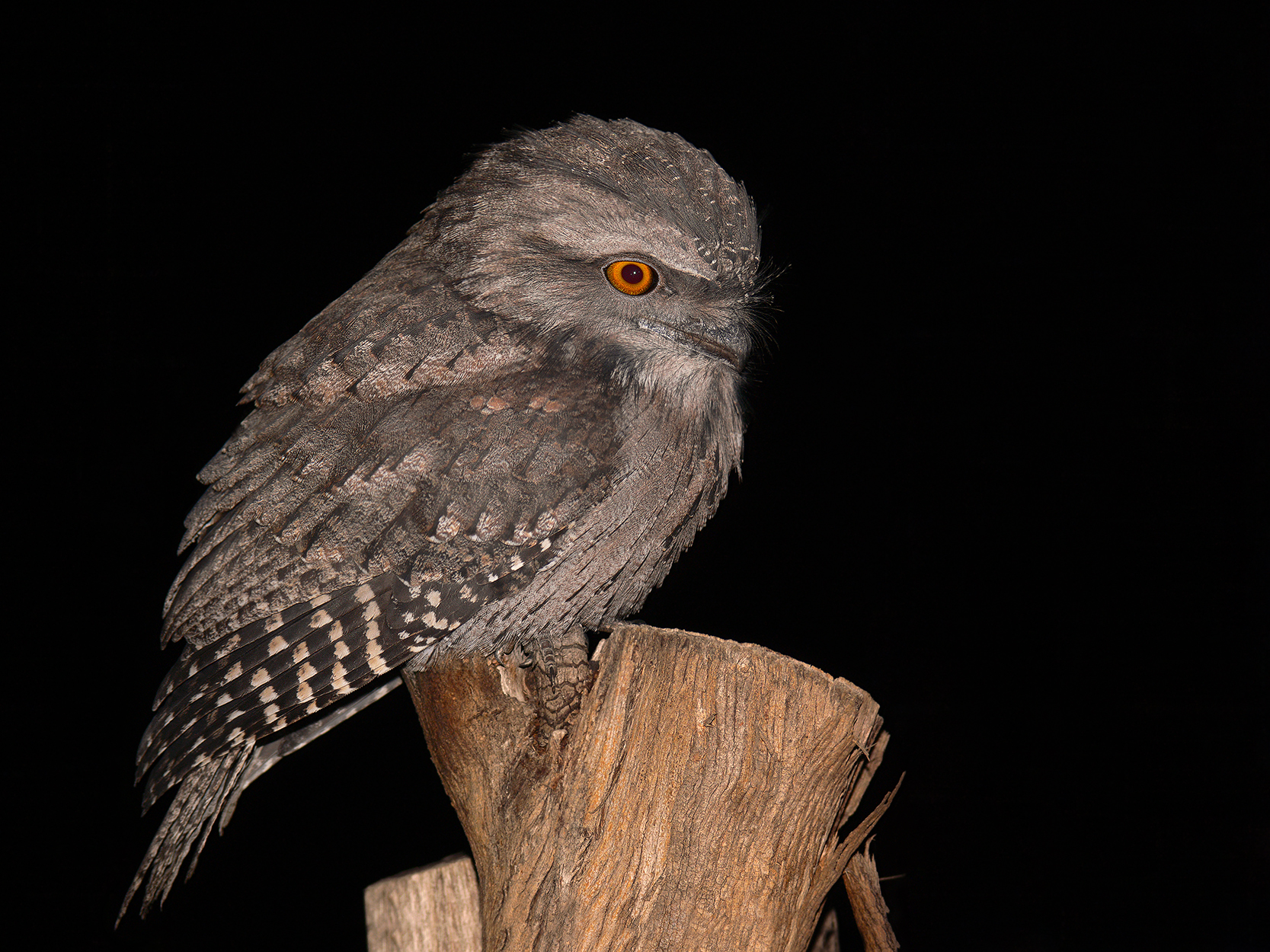
Rufous morph

Tawny frogmouths are large, big-headed birds that can measure from 34 to 53 cm (13 to 21 in) long. Weights have been recorded up to 680 g (1.50 lb) in the wild (and perhaps even more in captivity), but these are exceptionally high. In the nominate race, 55 males were found to weigh a mean of 354 g (12.5 oz), while 39 females weighed a mean of 297 g (10.5 oz), with a range between both of 157 to 555 g (5.5 to 19.6 oz). Among the subspecies P. s. brachypterus, 20 unsexed birds were found to average 278 g (9.8 oz) with a range of 185 to 416 g (6.5 to 14.7 oz). In P. s. phalaenoides, a weight range of 205 to 364 g (7.2 to 12.8 oz) was reported. Thus, in terms of average if not maximal body mass, the tawny is a bit smaller than its relative, the Papuan frogmouth. On average, the life expectancy of wild tawny frogmouths is up to 14 years and for those in captivity, as high as 30+ years. Tawny frogmouths are stocky and compact with rounded wings and short legs. They have wide, heavy, olive-grey to blackish bills that are hooked at the tip and topped with distinctive tufts of bristles. Their eyes are large and yellow, a trait shared by owls. However, they are not forward facing like an owl's.

Tawny frogmouths have three distinct colour morphs, grey being the most common in both sexes. Males of this morph have silver-grey upperparts with black streaks and slightly paler underparts with white barring and brown to rufous mottling. Females of this morph are often darker with more rufous mottling. Females of the subspecies P. s. strigoides have a chestnut morph and females of the subspecies P. s. phalaenoides have a rufous morph. Leucistic or albinistic all-white aberrant plumage for this species has been documented.

=== Camouflage ===
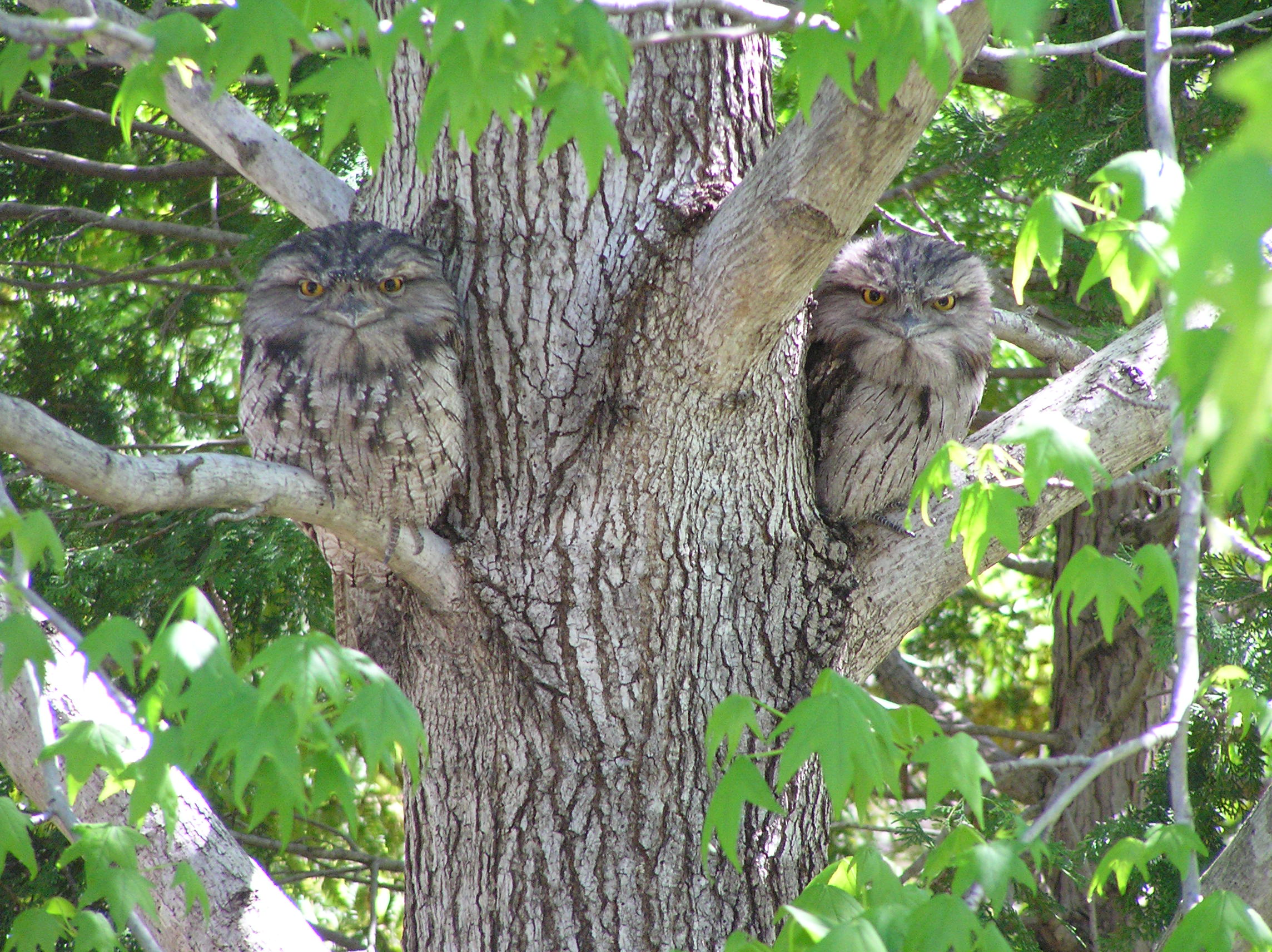
Camouflaged tawny frogmouths blend in with colour and texture of tree bark in Sydney.

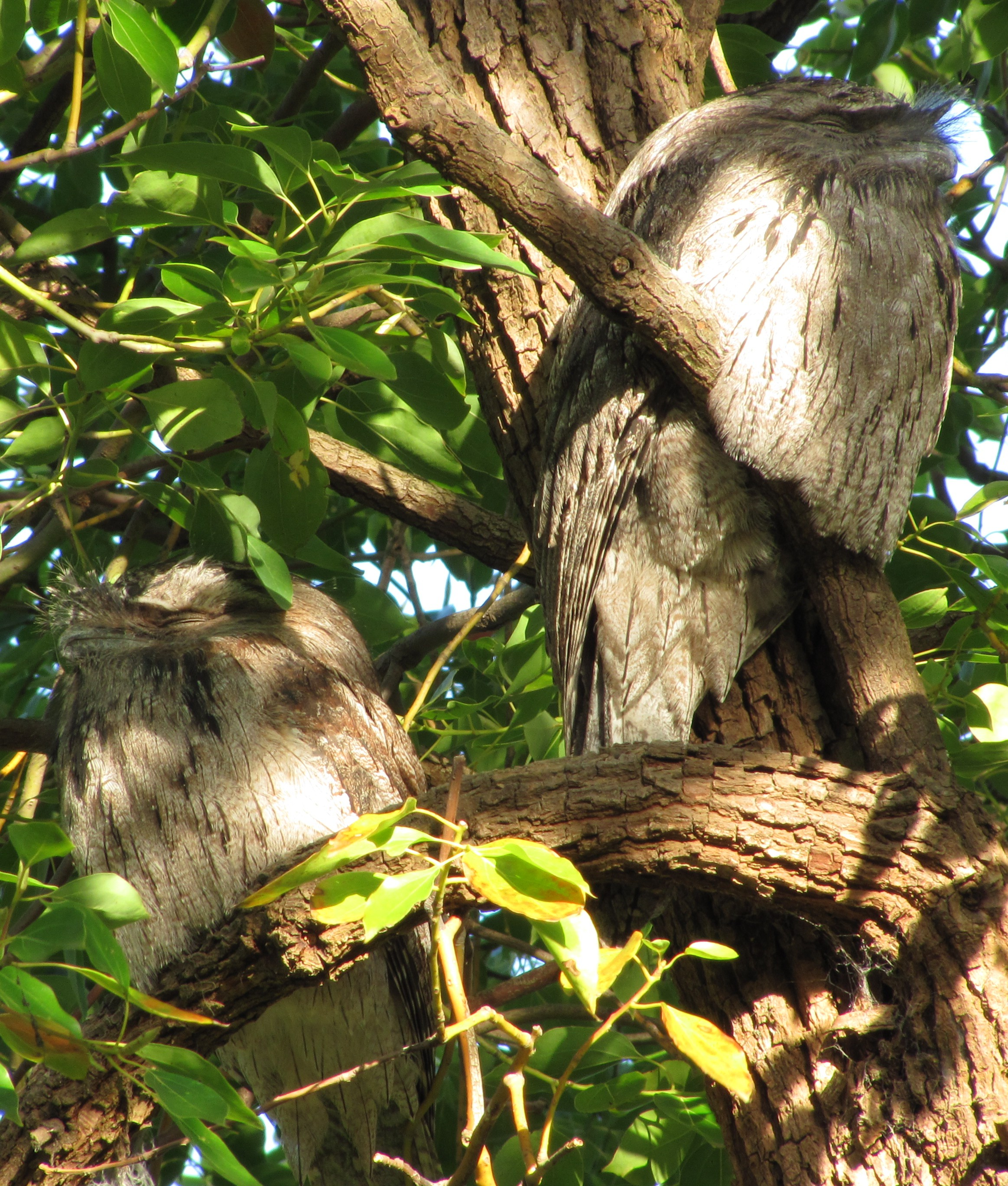
Camouflaged tawny frogmouth couple in afternoon sun, Melbourne

The tawny frogmouth makes use of cryptic plumage and mimicry to camouflage itself. These birds strategically perch themselves on low tree branches during daylight hours, cleverly assimilating with the tree itself. Their silvery-grey plumage, adorned with patterns of white, black, and brown streaks and mottles, enables them to seamlessly blend into the appearance of a fractured tree branch, rendering them nearly invisible in the bright light of day.

In a display of adaptation, the tawny frogmouth typically selects a segment of a tree branch that displays signs of breakage, perching upon it with its head elegantly inclined upwards at a distinctive angle. This posturing, coupled with their large and broad beaks, contributes to the resemblance they achieve. Frequently, a pair of tawny frogmouths will position themselves side by side, simultaneously angling their heads upwards. Only when closely approached do they emerge from their concealed positions, either taking flight or issuing warning signals to potential predators.

When faced with threats, adult tawny frogmouths employ a distinctive alarm call that serves as a signal to their chicks. This call instructs the young birds to maintain a state of silence and immobility, ensuring that their natural plumage camouflage remains intact and uncompromised.

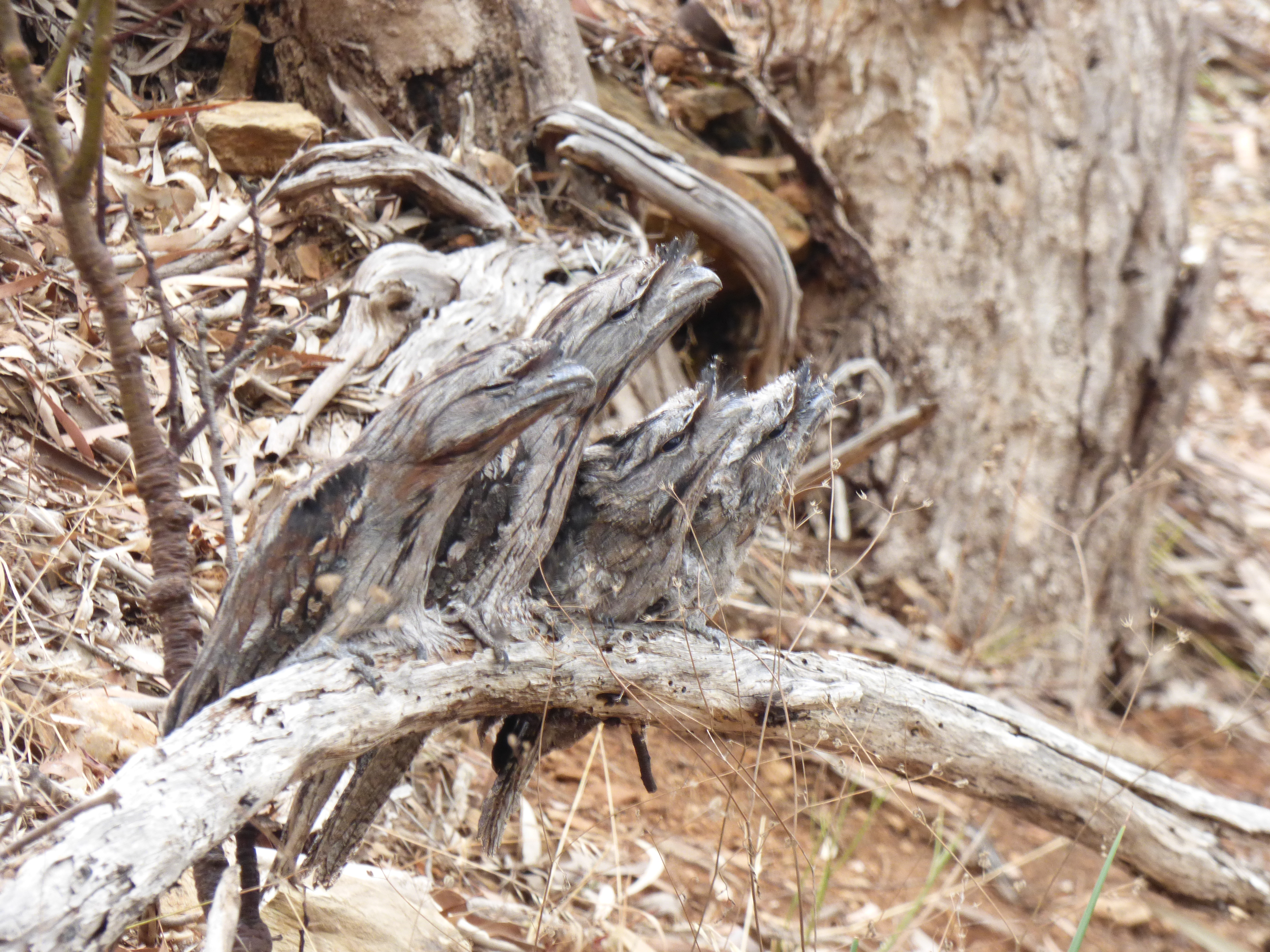
Family of four in alarm position, emulating broken branches

=== Differences from owls ===
Tawny frogmouths and owls both have mottled patterns, wide eyes, and anisodactyl feet. However, owls are birds of prey that possess strong legs, powerful talons, and toes with a unique flexible joint they use to catch prey. Tawny frogmouths are insectivores who prefer to catch their prey with their beaks and have fairly weak feet. They roost out in the open, relying on camouflage for defence, and build their nests in tree forks, whereas owls roost hidden in thick foliage and build their nests in tree hollows. Tawny frogmouths have wide, forward-facing beaks for catching insects, whereas owls have narrow, downwards-facing beaks used to tear prey apart. The eyes of tawny frogmouths are to the side of the face, while the eyes of owls are fully forward on the face. Furthermore, owls have full or partial face discs and large, asymmetrical ears, while tawny frogmouths do not.

== Distribution and habitat ==
Tawny frogmouths are found throughout most of the Australian mainland except in far western Queensland, the central Northern Territory, and most of the Nullarbor Plain. In Tasmania, they are common throughout the northern and eastern parts of the state.

They can be found in almost any habitat type, including forests and woodlands, scrub and heathland vegetation, and savannahs, but they are rarely seen in heavy rainforests and treeless deserts. They are seen in large numbers in areas populated with many river gums and casuarinas and can be found along river courses if these areas are timbered. Tawny frogmouths are a common nocturnal urban wildlife, especially in residential suburbs, having adapted to human presence. They have been reported nesting in parks and gardens with trees.

== Behaviour and ecology ==
=== Diet and feeding ===
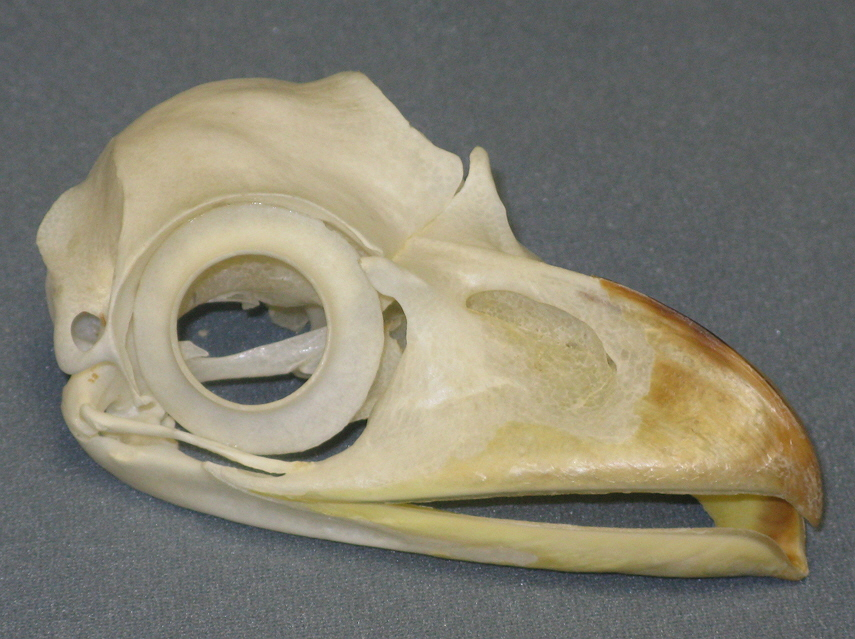
Tawny frogmouth skull

Tawny frogmouths are carnivorous and are considered to be among Australia's most effective pest-control birds, as their diet consists largely of species regarded as vermin or pests in houses, farms, and gardens. The bulk of their diet is composed of large nocturnal insects, such as moths, as well as spiders, worms, slugs, and snails, but also includes a variety of bugs, beetles, wasps, ants, centipedes, millipedes, and scorpions. Large numbers of invertebrates are consumed to make up sufficient biomass. Small mammals, reptiles, frogs, and birds are also eaten.

During daylight hours, healthy tawny frogmouths generally do not actively look for food, though they may sit with their mouths open, snapping them shut when an insect enters. As dusk approaches, they begin actively searching for food. They feed mainly by pouncing from a tree or other elevated perch to take large insects or small vertebrates from the ground using their beaks with great precision. Some smaller prey, such as moths, can be caught in flight. Foraging flights consist of short, snatching flights to foliage, branches, or into the air.

Tawny frogmouths do not consume prey collected on the ground or in flight on the spot unless it is very small. The captured prey is held in the tip of the beak and taken to a nearby branch, where it is then processed. Insects are generally pulped at the rim of the beak before being swallowed, and larger prey such as lizards or mice are generally killed before consumption by being vigorously struck against a branch.

=== Bonding and breeding ===
Tawny frogmouths form partnerships for life, and once established, pairs usually stay in the same territory for a decade or more. Establishing and maintaining physical contact is an integral part of their lifelong bond. During breeding season, pairs roost closely together on the same branch, often with their bodies touching. The male carries out grooming by gently stroking through the plumage of the female with his beak in sessions that can last for 10 minutes or more.

The breeding season of tawny frogmouths is from August to December, but individuals in arid areas are known to breed in response to heavy rains. Males and females both share in the building of nests by collecting twigs and mouthfuls of leaves and dropping them into position. Nests are usually placed on horizontal, forked tree branches and can reach up to 30 cm (12 in) in diameter. Loose sticks are piled together, and leaf litter and grass stems are placed to soften the centre. The nests are very fragile and can disintegrate easily.

The clutch size of the tawny frogmouth is one to three eggs. Both sexes share incubation of the eggs during the night, whilst during the day, males incubate the eggs. For the duration of the incubation period, the nest is rarely left unattended. One partner roosts on a nearby branch and provides food for the brooding partner. Once hatched, both parents cooperate in the supply of food to the young. The fledging period of the tawny frogmouth is 25 to 35 days, during which they develop half their adult mass.

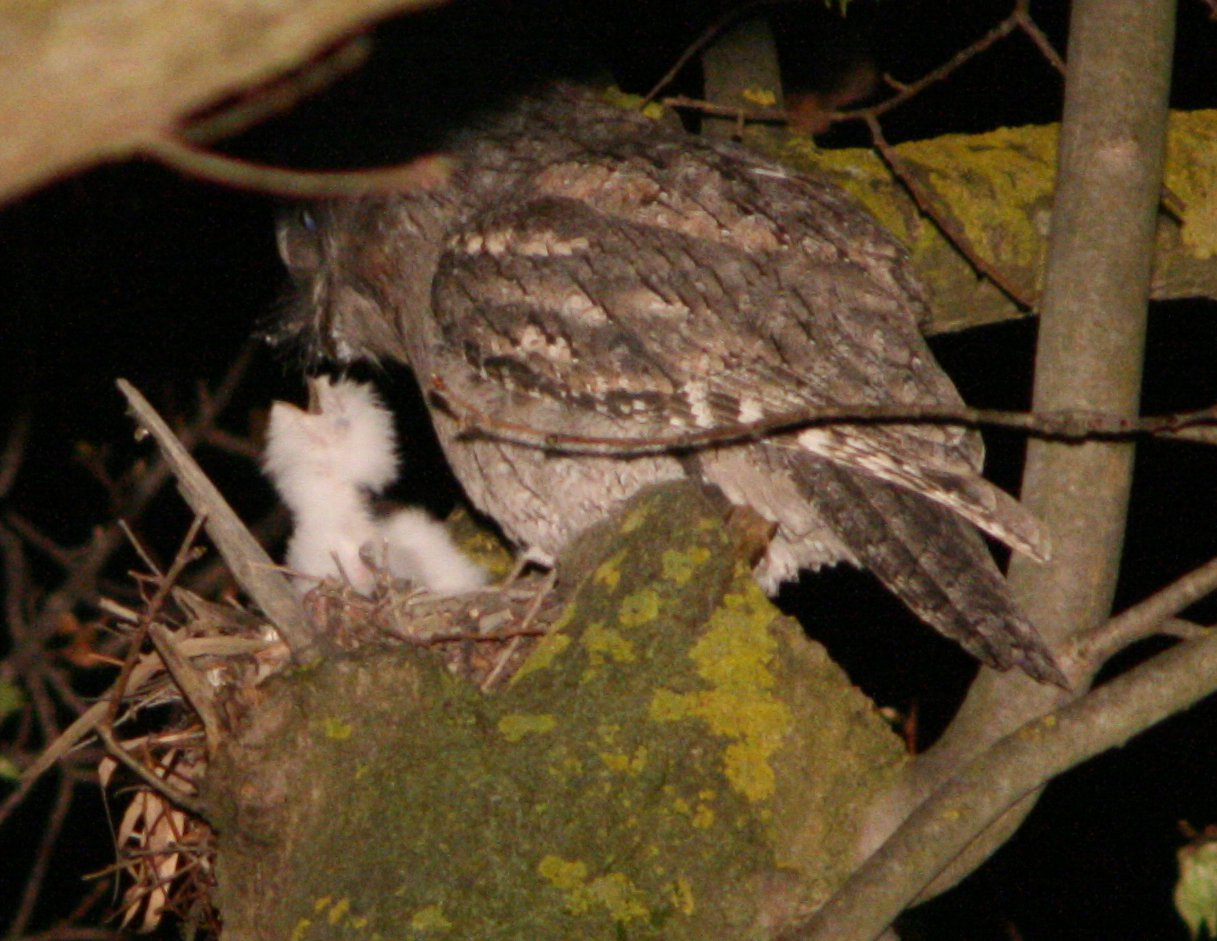
Chicks five days after hatching, Melbourne

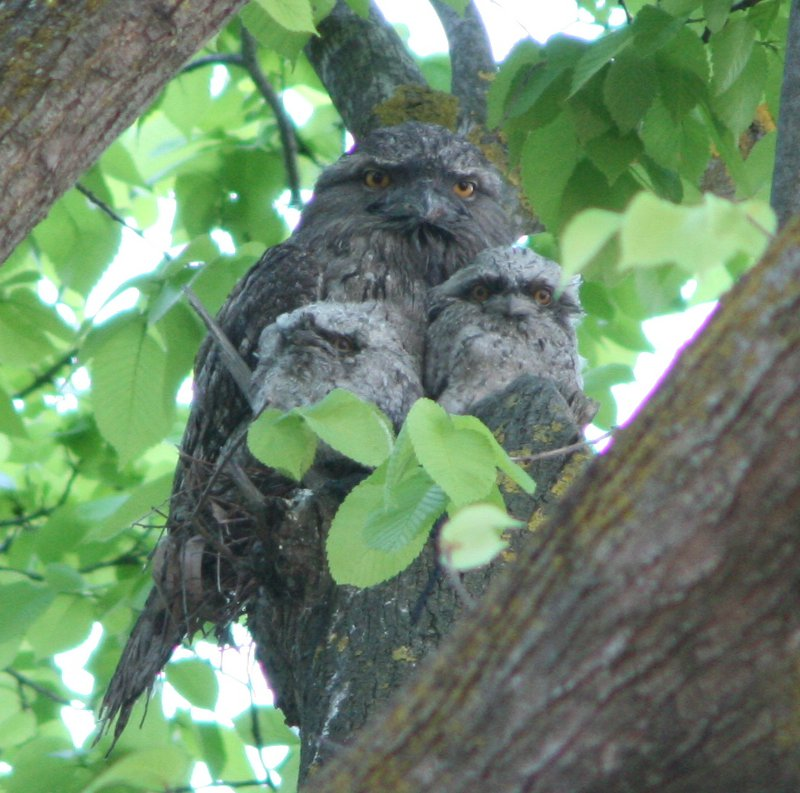
Tawny frogmouth with two 32-day-old chicks, Melbourne

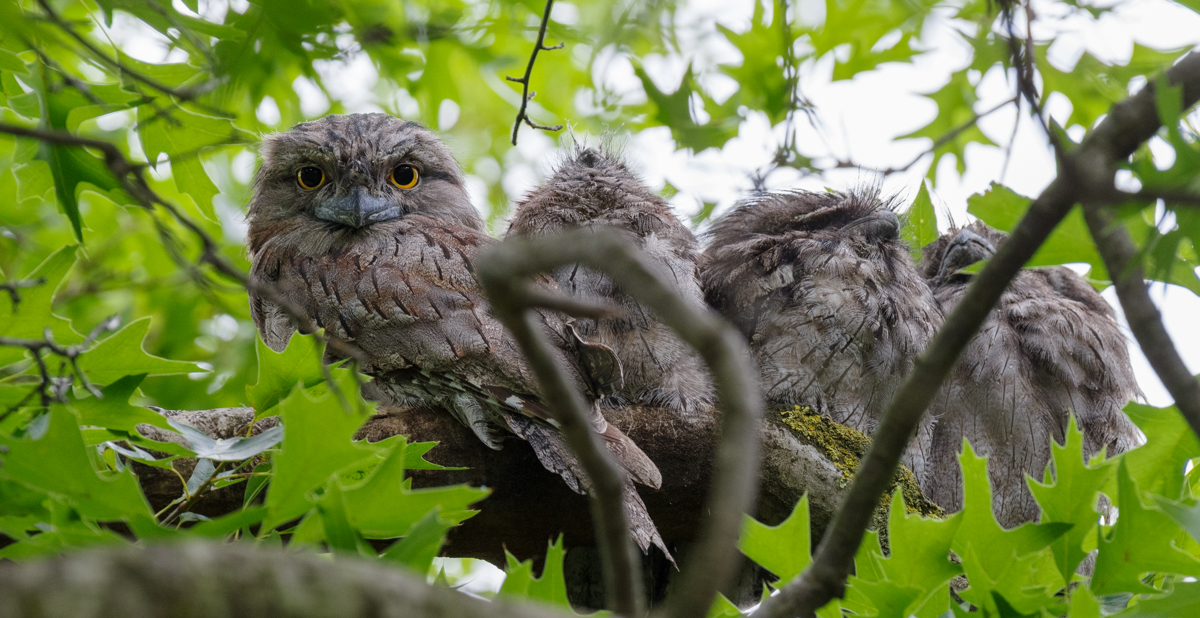
Tawny frogmouth pair with two mature chicks, end of December, Melbourne

=== Vocalisations ===
Tawny frogmouths have a wide range of vocalisations that can signal information about sex, territory, food, or predators. They generally use low-amplitude and low-frequency sounds to communicate, though some of their warning screams can be heard for miles. Nestlings make a number of unique calls expressing distress, hunger, or fear. Juveniles retain this range while developing a loud call for begging. Nestlings, juveniles, and adults all use a low-amplitude annoyance call meant for family members. When disturbed during rest, they can emit a soft warning buzz that sounds similar to a bee, and when threatened, they can make a loud hissing noise and produce clacking sounds with their beaks.

At night, tawny frogmouths emit a deep and continuous "oom-oom-oom" grunting at a frequency of about eight calls in 5 seconds. The steady grunts are often repeated a number of times throughout the night. They also make a soft, breathy "whoo-whoo-whoo" call at night of lower intensity, but at the same frequency. Before and during breeding season, males and females perform duets consisting of call sequences that either alternate between partners or are performed simultaneously. Tawny frogmouths also make distinctive drumming noises during breeding season.

=== Thermoregulation ===
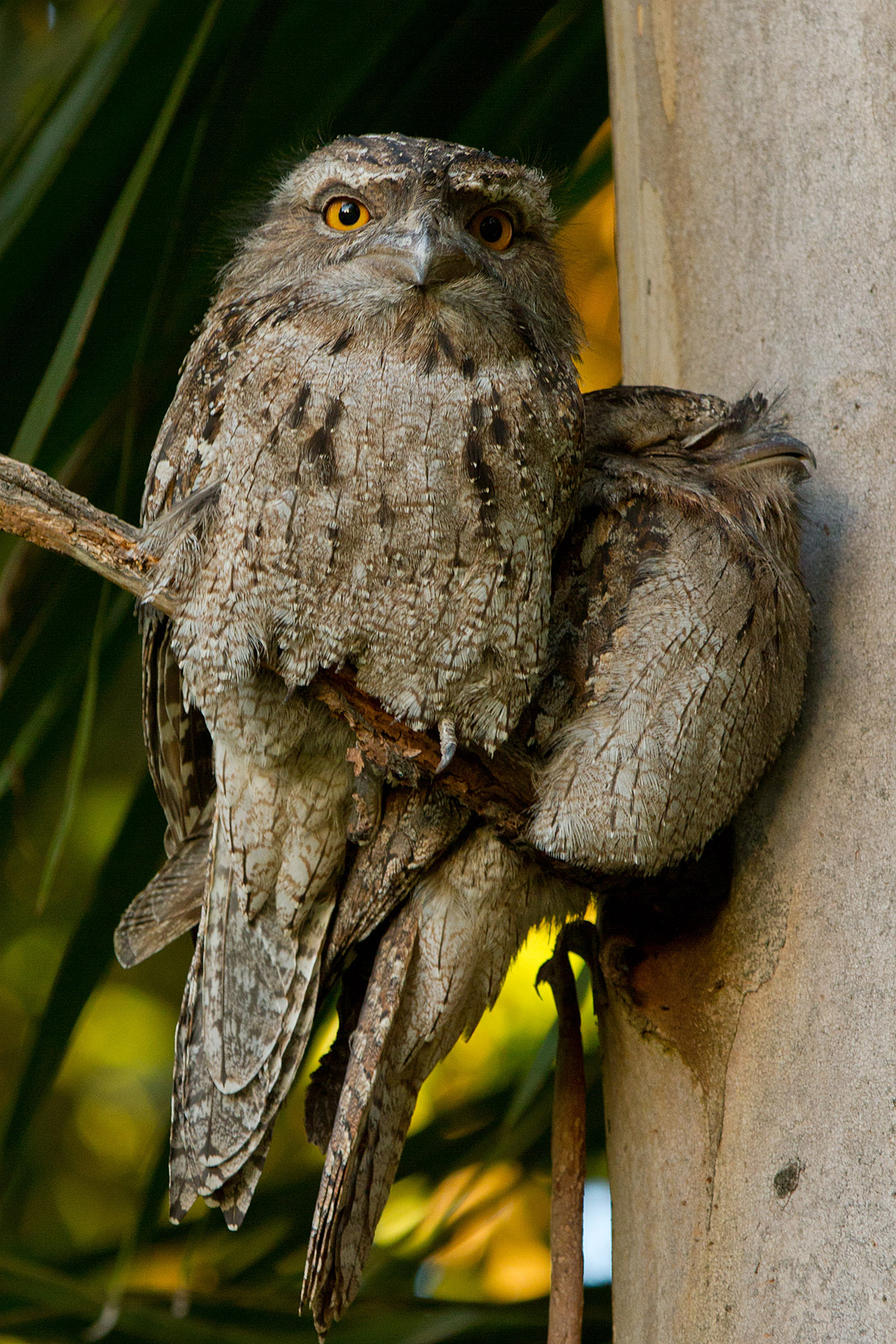
Pair of tawny frogmouths in Brisbane Botanic Gardens

The wide distribution range of the tawny frogmouth includes areas of the Australian continent where winter night temperatures regularly approach or grow colder than 0 °C (32 °F) and warm summers can have extremes above 40 °C (104 °F). The high temperatures in summer and low temperatures in winter provide a thermoregulatory challenge for tawny frogmouths that roost all day out in the open.

Significant differences in the orientation of tawny frogmouths on branches have been observed during winter and summer. During summer when light intensity is at maximum strength, they tend to choose positions on branches that do not have all-day exposure to sunlight. Physiological testing has shown that they are able to triple their breathing rate without the need to open their beaks. However, when their body temperature rises by as much as 4–5°C, they begin to pant. Faced with further heat stress, tawny frogmouths engorge the blood vessels in the mouth to increase the flow of blood to the buccal area and produce a mucus that helps to cool air as it is inhaled, hence cooling the body.

During winter, tawny frogmouths choose northerly oriented positions on branches that are more exposed to sunlight to increase body heat. Pair roosting and huddling to share body warmth is also common during winter. During daylight, tawny frogmouths sometimes perch on the ground to sunbathe, remaining motionless up to 5 minutes. During this time, the birds open their beaks wide, close their eyes, and move their heads to the side to allow sunrays to penetrate beneath the thick layer of feathers.

=== Torpor ===
During winter, the food supply shrinks drastically and prewinter body fat stores can only provide a limited supply of energy. Tawny frogmouths are unable to survive the winter months without spending much of their days and nights in torpor. Torpor results in energy conservation by significantly slowing down heart rate and metabolism, which lowers body temperature. Torpor is different from hibernation in that it only lasts for relatively short periods of time, usually a few hours. Shallow torpor lasts for several hours and is a regular, daily occurrence in the winter. Dawn torpor bouts are shorter and temperature reduction may be as small as 0.5 to 1.5 °C, while night torpor bouts last several hours and can reduce body temperature by up to 10 °C.

== Conservation and threats ==
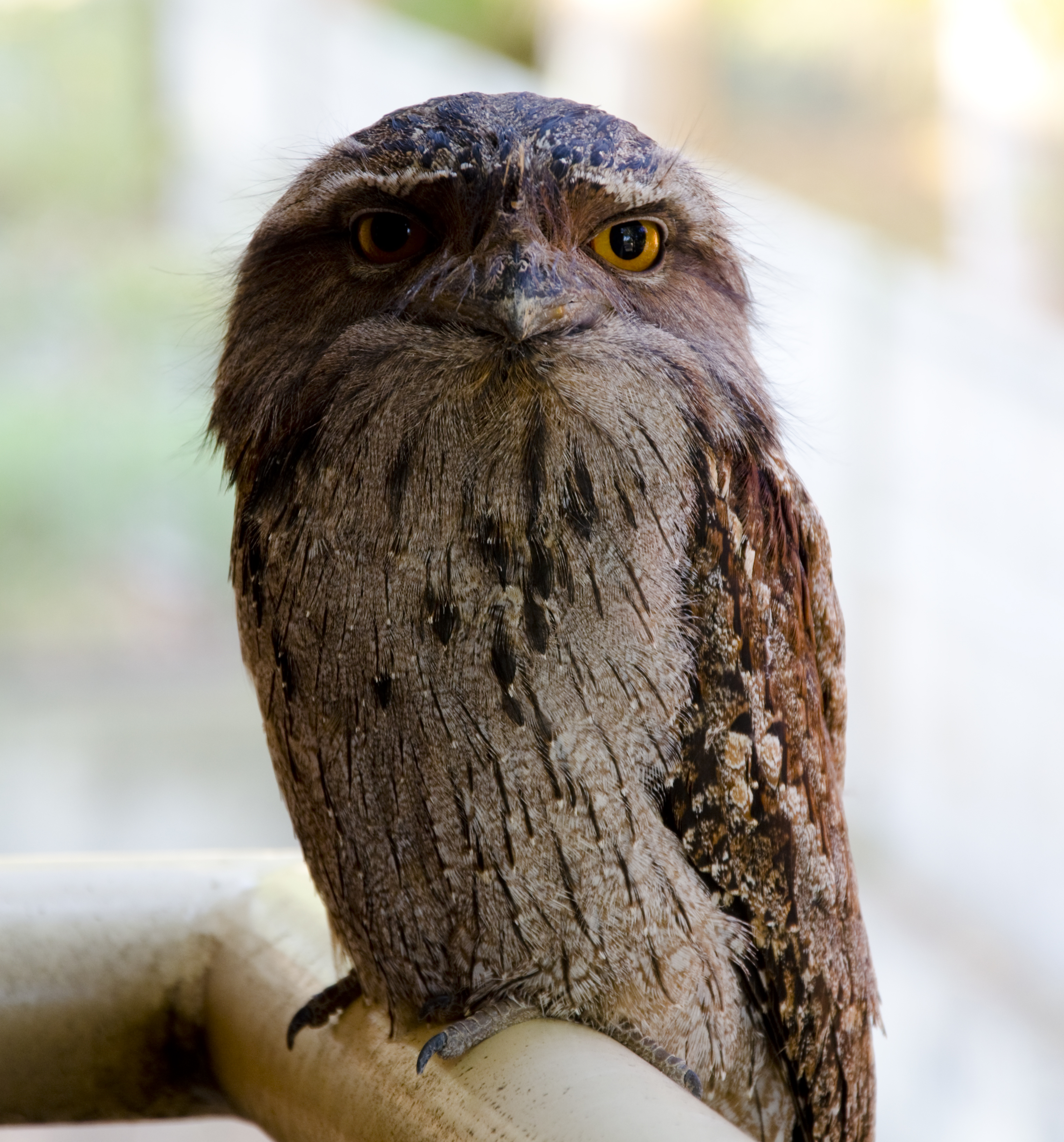
Perching on a balcony in Sydney, Australia

The conservation status of tawny frogmouths is "least concern" due to their widespread distribution. A number of ongoing threats to the health of the population, though, are known. Many bird and mammalian carnivores are known to prey upon the tawny frogmouth. Native birds, including ravens, butcherbirds, and currawongs, may steal the protein-rich eggs to feed their own young. Birds of prey such as hobbies and falcons, as well as rodents and tree-climbing snakes, also cause major damage to the clutches by taking eggs and nestlings. In subtropical areas where food is available throughout the year, tawny frogmouths sometimes start brooding earlier in winter to avoid the awakening of snakes after brumation. Since 1998, a cluster of cases of neurological disease has occurred in tawny frogmouths in the Sydney area, caused by the parasite Angiostrongylus cantonensis, a rat lungworm.

=== Human impact ===
Tawny frogmouths face a number of threats from human activities and pets. They are often killed or injured on rural roads during feeding, as they fly in front of cars when chasing insects illuminated in the beam of the headlights. Large-scale land clearing of eucalypt trees and intense bushfires are serious threats to their populations, as they tend not to move to other areas if their homes are destroyed. House cats are the most significant introduced predator of the tawny frogmouth, but dogs and foxes are known to also occasionally kill the birds. When tawny frogmouths pounce to catch prey on the ground, they are slow to return to flight and vulnerable to attack from these predators.

As they have adapted to live in close proximity to human populations, tawny frogmouths are at high risk of exposure to pesticides. Continued widespread use of insecticides and rodent poisons are hazardous, as they remain in the system of the target animal and can be fatal to a tawny frogmouth that eats them. The effect of these toxins is often indirect, as they can be absorbed into fatty tissue with the bird experiencing no overt signs of ill health until the winter, when the fat deposits are drawn on and the poison enters the bloodstream.
