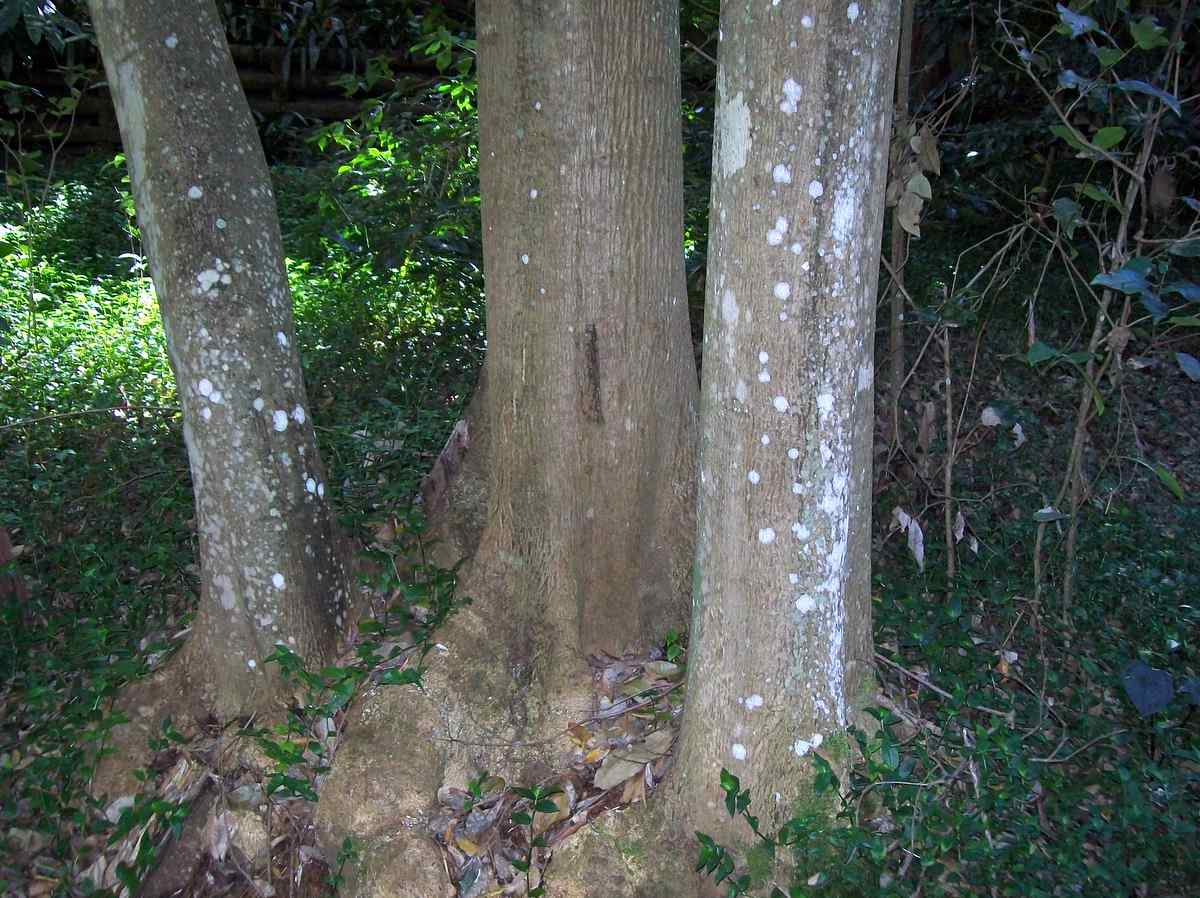
- Chatswood West, Australia

Conservation status
- Least Concern (IUCN 3.1)

Scientific classification
- Kingdom: Plantae
- Clade: Tracheophytes
- Clade: Angiosperms
- Clade: Eudicots
- Clade: Rosids
- Order: Oxalidales
- Family: Cunoniaceae
- Genus: Schizomeria
- Species: S. ovata

Binomial name
- Schizomeria ovata D.Don

Synonyms
- Ceratopetalum ovatum Caley ex D.Don

= Schizomeria ovata =

Species of tree

Schizomeria ovata, a medium to large Australian rainforest tree, is widespread in warm-temperate rainforest in coastal New South Wales north from Narooma (36° S) and southern Queensland south from Fraser Island (25° S). Common names include (Australian) white birch, crab apple, white cherry, snowberry, humbug, and squeaker.

Timber is pale blond, and is a commercial species, under the name Australian white birch. The timber was notably used as an interior finish in the Sydney Opera House. Plywood veneered with Schizomeria ovata was used for the ceiling, upper walls, and seating of the Concert Hall, and for wall and ceiling panelling and doors in other internal areas.
