= Ferndale Park =

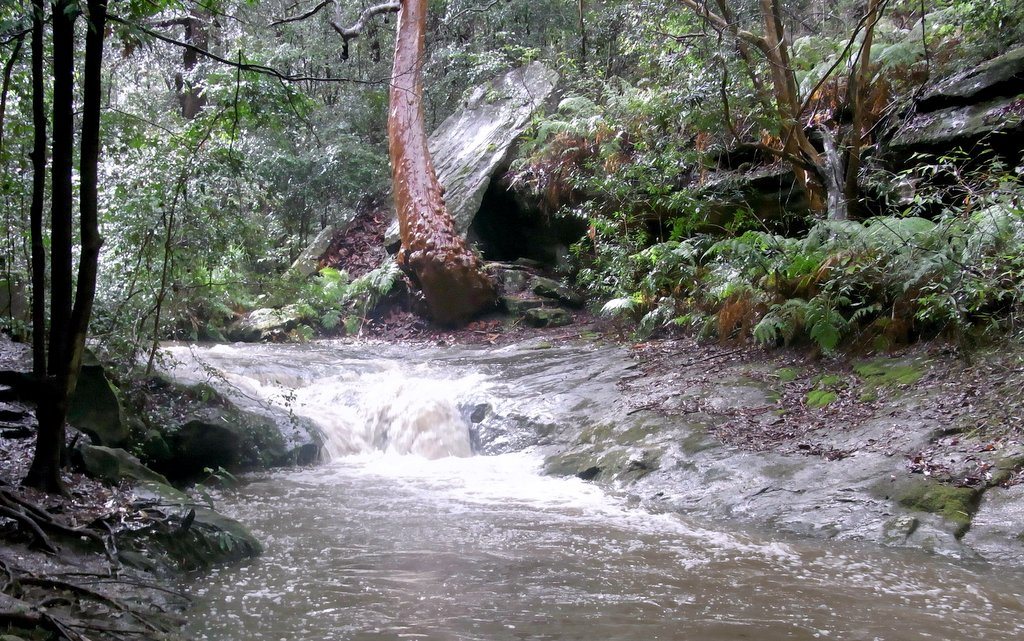
- "Old Man's Cave" and Swaines Creek

- Coordinates: 33°48′00″S 151°10′12″E
- Country: Australia
- State: New South Wales
- Website: Ferndale Park

Ferndale Park is located in suburban Chatswood, 8 km (5 mi) from the centre of Sydney, Australia. It is an important urban forest reserve, preserving blackbutt forest and the mossy gully rainforest. Most of this original forest was cleared for agriculture and housing in the 19th and 20th century.

== Geography ==
Average annual rainfall is 1,200 mm (47 in) at the nearby Chatswood Bowling Club. Soils are moderately fertile, based on Hawkesbury sandstone and Ashfield Shale. Most of the reserve is considered part of the Sydney Sandstone Gully Forest.

== History ==
The local indigenous Australian people, the Cammeraygal, occupied this area for at least 5,800 years. They were known to shelter in "Old Man's Cave" in heatwaves or heavy rain.

== Recreation ==
Ferndale Park has a series of walking tracks. Office workers from Chatswood may be seen jogging through the reserve at lunchtime and after work.

== Flora ==
Noteworthy indigenous flora includes the blackbutt, tree heath, celery wood, coachwood, native crabapple and hard corkwood. An impressive number of fern species grow here, including jungle brake, fishbone water fern, filmy fern, Japanese lady fern, delicate rock fern and the necklace fern. The green cliff brake is an invasive fern species. The endangered dwarf finger fern grows on sandstone cliffs. In winter, waxcap mushroom species in the Hygrophoraceae may be seen.

== Fauna ==
Ring-tail possums, brushtail possums and grey-headed flying foxes are common. Birds such as brushturkeys, rainbow lorikeets, Australian king parrots, crimson rosellas, currawongs, owlet-nightjar, koel, tawny frogmouth, pacific baza and powerful owl are some of the many found in the park. Microbats are present, including Gould's wattled bat, Lesser long-eared bat and the Little Forest Bat. Many species of spider and other invertebrates live in the reserve. The Emerald Spotted Frog is known to occur. An important remnant marsupial is the sugar glider.

== Bush regeneration ==
Forest conservation work is in progress. The weeds trad and privet being particularly troublesome. The shady areas form excellent habitats for fungi and rainforest plants, but disturbed areas are suited to invasive weeds.
