= Waxcap grassland =

Type of grassland

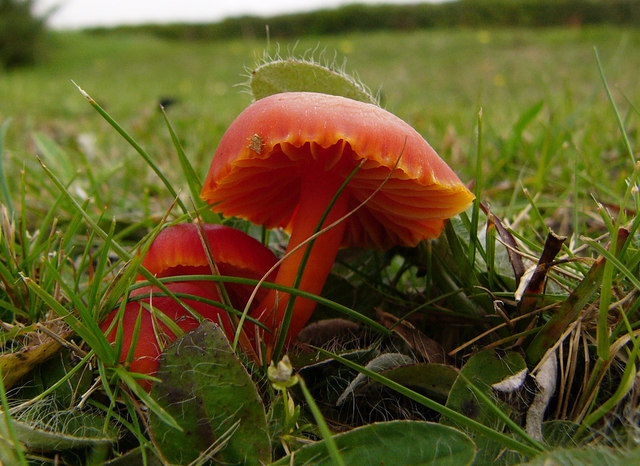
Hygrocybe coccinea, a typical waxcap grassland species

Waxcap grassland is a type of short-sward, nutrient-poor grassland that supports a diverse range of larger fungi, particularly waxcaps (species of Hygrocybe and related genera), which are characteristic of such habitats. Waxcap grasslands are principally found in Europe, where they are declining due to agricultural practices. Consequently, the fungal species are of conservation concern, and efforts have been made in the United Kingdom and elsewhere to protect both the grasslands and their characteristic fungi. Thirty European species of waxcap grassland fungi are currently assessed as globally "vulnerable" or "endangered" on the IUCN Red List of threatened species.

== Background ==
The association of waxcaps with unimproved (nutrient-poor) grasslands was first noted in 1949 in the Netherlands, but current interest was stimulated by a series of papers published by Dutch mycologist Eef Arnolds in the 1980s. Arnolds not only confirmed the association of waxcaps with unimproved grasslands, but also noted the rapid decline of such habitats in the Netherlands. Similar studies were subsequently undertaken elsewhere in Europe, initially in Denmark and the United Kingdom.

== Definition and description ==
Waxcap grasslands are characterised by being unimproved (unfertilised and nutrient-poor), with a short sward due to grazing or mowing. They are also moss-rich and long-established, not having been recently sown. They occur in both upland and lowland areas and may be found on acidic, neutral, or calcareous soil. They support a wide range of characteristic larger fungi, but may not be equally species-rich in plants.

== Characteristic species ==
Larger fungi characteristic of waxcap grasslands include agarics (gilled mushrooms) belonging to the genera Cuphophyllus, Gliophorus, Gloioxanthomyces, Hygrocybe, Neohygrocybe, and Porpolomopsis (waxcaps), Entoloma (pinkgills), Dermoloma, Pseudotricholoma, Camarophyllopsis, and Hodophilus; clavarioid fungi (club and coral fungi) belonging to the genera Clavaria, Clavulinopsis, and Ramariopsis; and earthtongues belonging to the genera Geoglossum, Glutinoglossum, Microglossum, and Trichoglossum.

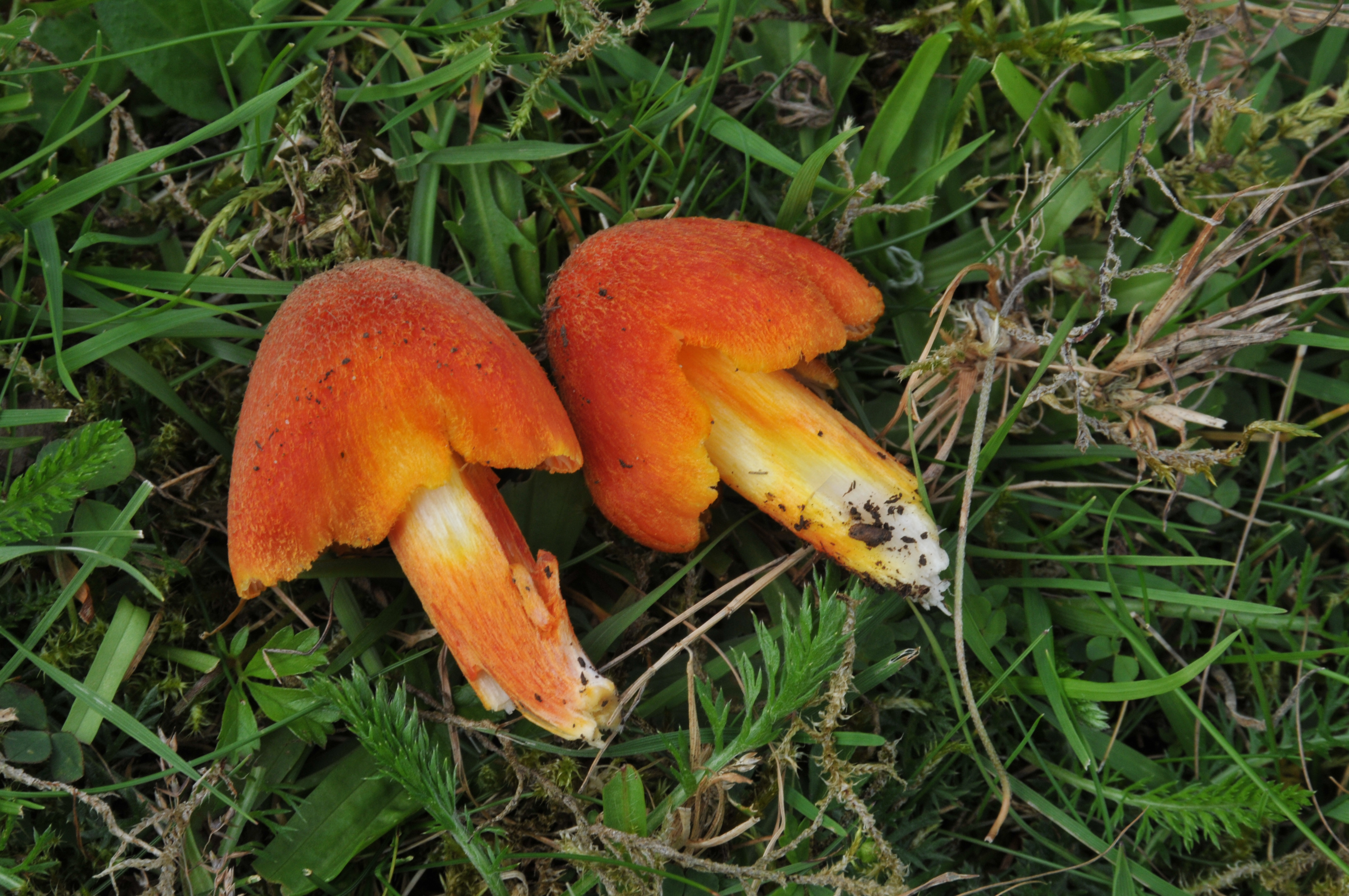
Hygrocybe intermedia

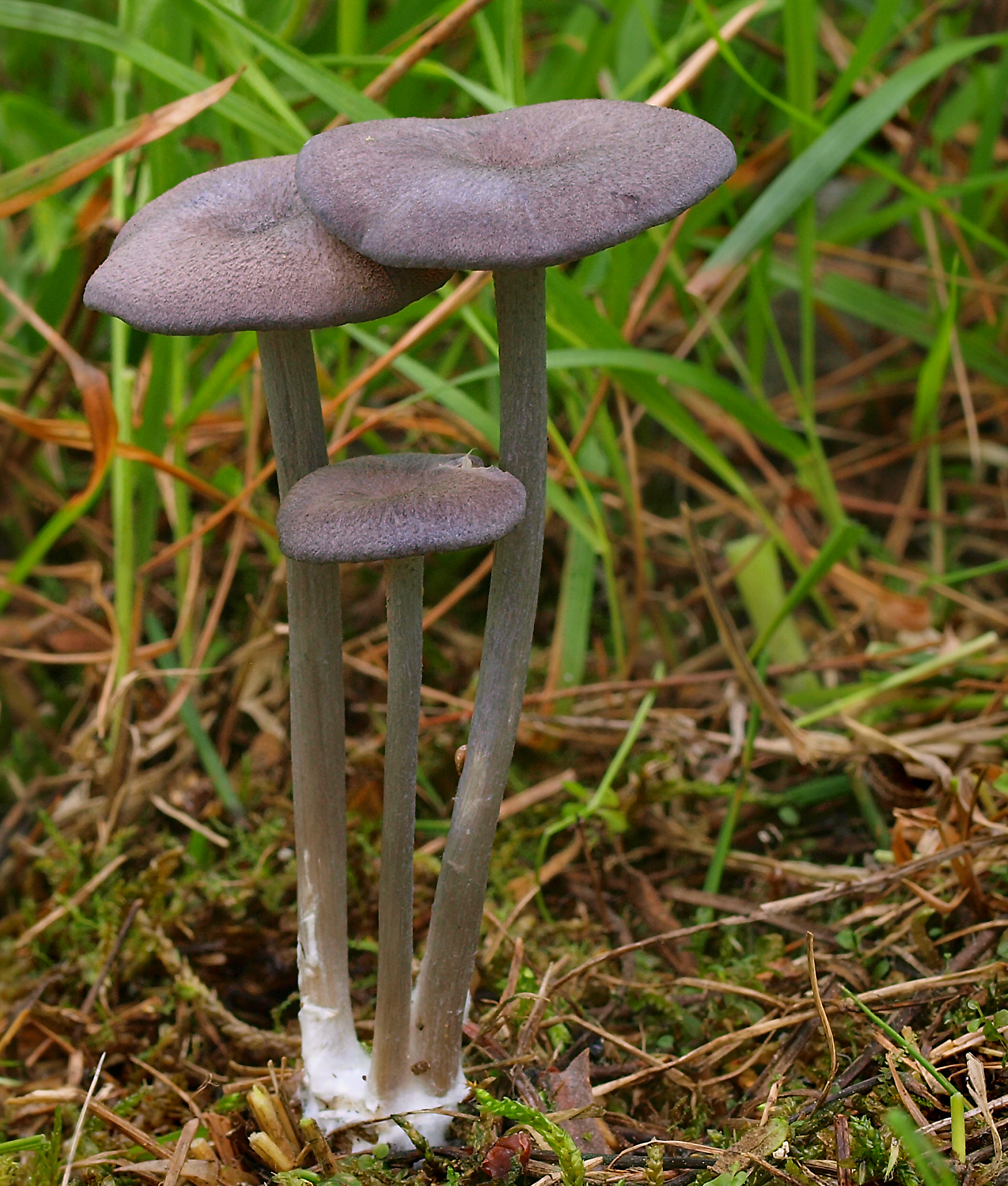
Entoloma mougeotii

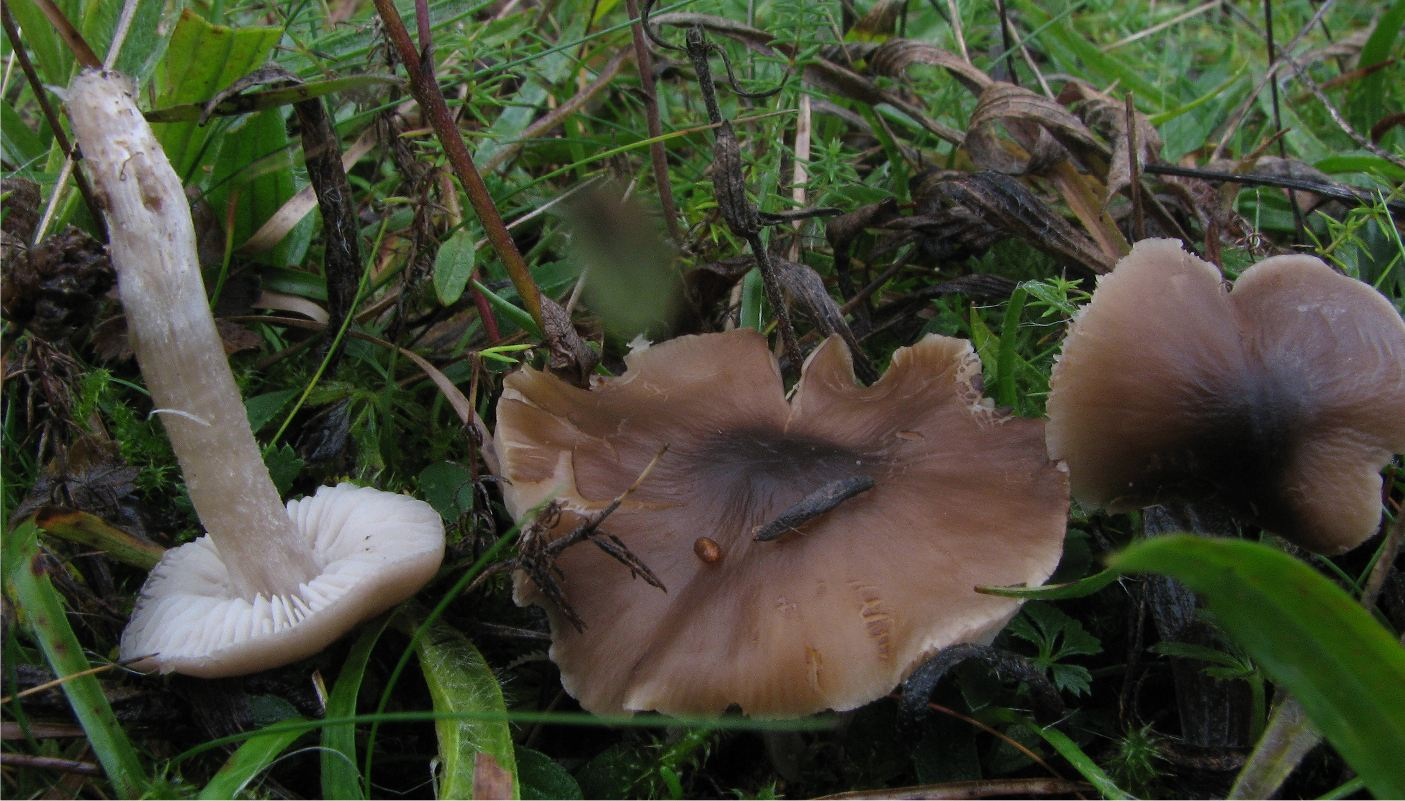
Dermoloma cuneifolium

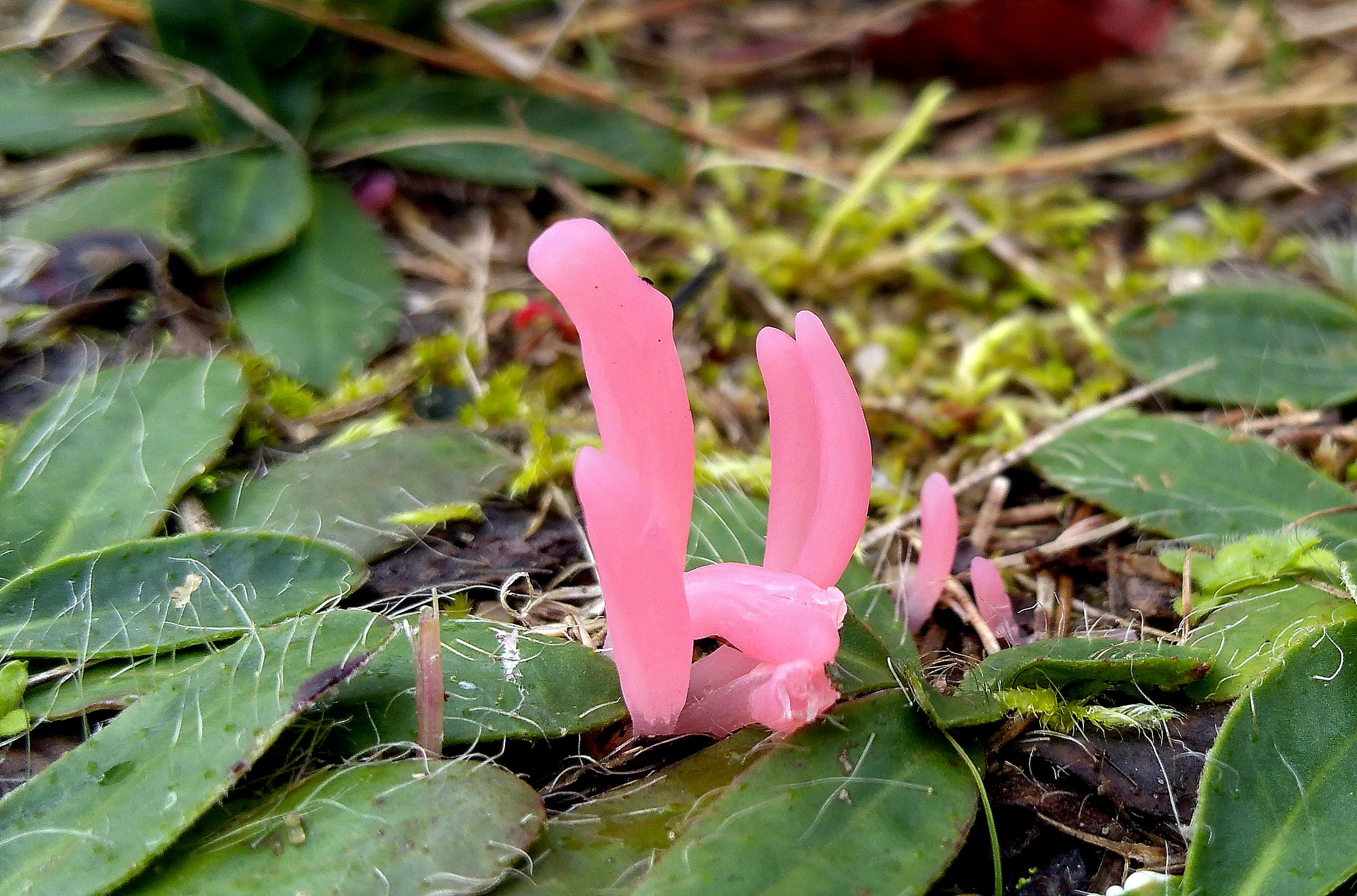
Clavaria rosea

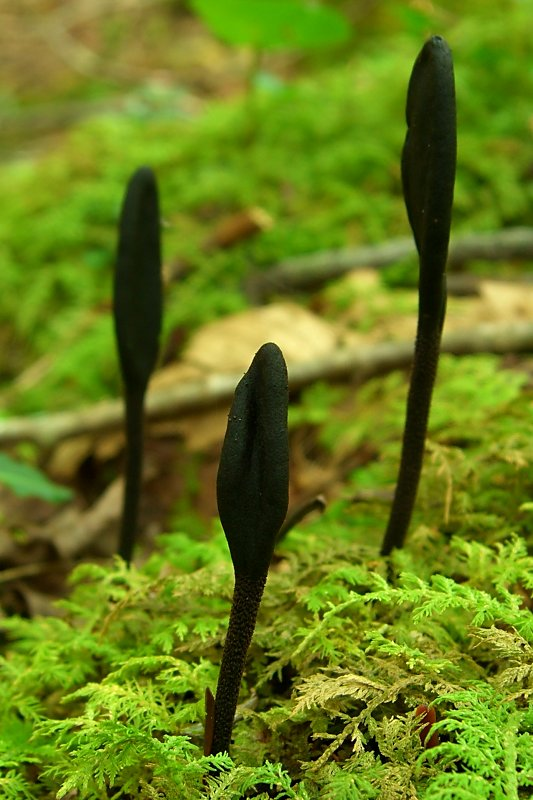
Trichoglossum hirsutum

== The "CHEG" or "CHEGD" assessment system ==
In 1995, Rald proposed a simple method of counting the number of waxcap species present at a given site in order to assess its value as a waxcap grassland. He suggested that sites with 17 or more species were of national importance, those with 9–16 species were of regional importance, those with 4–8 species of local importance, and those with 3 or fewer of no importance. This system was modified by Rotheroe and others to include all the characteristic macrofungi, not just waxcaps.

Known as the "CHEG" system, this is widely used in survey work today. The acronym "CHEG" stands for the main groups of relevant fungi: C - the clavarioid species (club and coral fungi); H - species of Hygrocybe and related genera (waxcaps); E - Entoloma species (pinkgills); and G - the geoglossoid fungi (earthtongues). More recently the modified term "CHEGD" has been used to include species of Dermoloma, Pseudotricholoma, Camarophyllopsis, and Hodophilus which also inhabit these grasslands.

== Conservation ==
Over the past 75 years, more than 90% of unimproved grasslands in Western Europe have been lost, primarily due to agricultural intensification through ploughing, reseeding, manuring, and the application of fertilizers and other chemicals. The maintenance of a short sward through grazing or mowing and the subsequent removal of cuttings has also been shown to be important for waxcap fruiting. It has been found that hay cutting in July, followed by aftermath grazing or mowing to 3 cm is optimal. In 1988, Arnolds estimated that only around 200 hectares of unimproved waxcap grasslands remained in the Netherlands.

As a result, both the unimproved, nutrient-poor grasslands and the larger fungi that are characteristic of such grasslands are of conservation concern. Currently, 30 waxcap-grassland species are classified as globally "vulnerable" or "endangered" on the IUCN Red List of Threatened Species.

=== Globally threatened waxcap-grassland fungi ===
Image	Scientific name	English name	Current IUCN Red List Status
	Clavaria zollingeri	Violet Coral	vulnerable
	Cuphophyllus canescens	Felted Waxcap	vulnerable
	Cuphophyllus colemannianus	Toasted Waxcap	vulnerable
	Cuphophyllus flavipes	Yellow Foot Waxcap	vulnerable
	Cuphophyllus lacmus	Grey Waxcap	vulnerable
	Cuphophyllus lepidopus	Scalyfoot Waxcap	vulnerable
	Cuphophyllus radiatus	Slender Waxcap	vulnerable
	Entoloma bloxamii	Big Blue Pinkgill	vulnerable
	Entoloma griseocyaneum	Felted Pinkgill	vulnerable
	Entoloma porphyrophaeum	Lilac Pinkgill	vulnerable
	Entoloma prunuloides	Mealy Pinkgill	vulnerable
	Gliophorus europerplexus	Butterscotch Waxcap	vulnerable
	Gliophorus reginae	Jubilee Waxcap	vulnerable
	Gloioxanthomyces vitellinus	Glistening Waxcap	endangered
	Hygrocybe aurantiosplendens	Orange Waxcap	vulnerable
	Hygrocybe citrinovirens	Citrine Waxcap	vulnerable
	Hygrocybe intermedia	Fibrous Waxcap	Vulnerable
	Hygrocybe mucronella	Bitter Waxcap	vulnerable
	Hygrocybe punicea	Crimson Waxcap	vulnerable
	Hygrocybe quieta	Oily Waxcap	vulnerable
	Hygrocybe spadicea	Date Waxcap	vulnerable
	Hygrocybe splendidissima	Splendid Waxcap	vulnerable
	Hygrocybe subpapillata	Papillate Waxcap	vulnerable
	Microglossum atropurpureum	Dark-purple Earthtongue	vulnerable
	Neohygrocybe ingrata	Dingy Waxcap	vulnerable
	Neohygrocybe nitrata	Nitrous Waxcap	vulnerable
	Neohygrocybe ovina	Blushing Waxcap	vulnerable
	Porpolomopsis calyptriformis	Pink Waxcap	vulnerable
	Pseudotricholoma metapodium	Mealy Meadowcap	endangered
	Trichoglossum walteri	Short-spored Earthtongue	vulnerable

=== Conservation in the United Kingdom ===
In the United Kingdom, survey work has shown that surviving waxcap grasslands are more extensive than in many other European countries, thanks mainly to large areas of unimproved upland sheep pastures and also to many unimproved lawns (especially in churchyards and country houses) and amenity grasslands. Nonetheless, five species characteristic of waxcap grasslands - Entoloma bloxamii, Porpolomopsis calyptriformis, Hygrocybe spadicea, Microglossum atropurpureum, and Microglossum olivaceum - were formerly the subject of national Biodiversity Action Plans and waxcap grasslands as a specific habitat were the subject of several local Biodiversity Action Plans. Four species - E. bloxamii, H. spadicea, M. atropurpureum, and M. olivaceum - are currently listed as "Priority Species" under Section 41 of the Natural Environment and Rural Communities Act (in England) and Section 7 of the Environment (Wales) Act (in Wales).

JNCC (Joint Nature Conservation Committee) has issued "Guidelines for the Selection of Biological SSSIs" (Sites of Special Scientific Interest) that offer a measure of protection to waxcap grasslands. Using the "CHEGD" system, sites should be considered for notification as SSSIs if the total number of waxcap species reaches or exceeds 19. Thresholds are also stipulated for other CHEGD species. As a result, several waxcap-grassland sites, such as the banks of Llanishen and Lisvane Reservoirs in Cardiff, Down Farm in Dorset, The Leasowes in Shropshire, and the lawns of Roecliffe Manor in Leicestershire, have been designated Sites of Special Scientific Interest.

Waxcap grassland surveys have been undertaken by the British Mycological Society, the National Trust, Plantlife, and the various national conservation bodies. A leaflet on managing waxcap grasslands in Britain and Ireland has been published by Plantlife and the Fungus Conservation Forum.

=== Translocation ===
Translocation has been proposed to mitigate the loss of waxcap grasslands. However currently there is no evidence of successful translocation.
