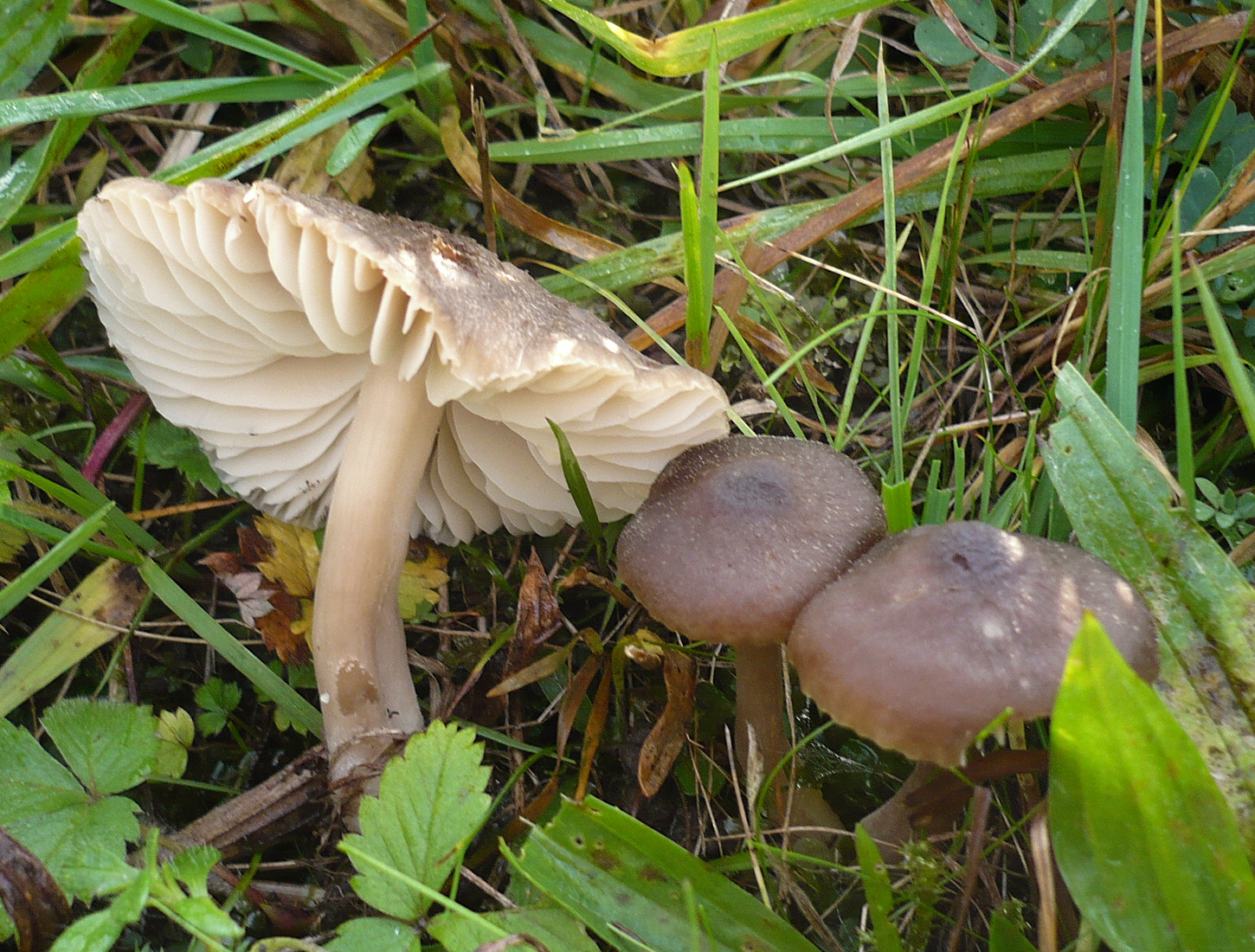
- Neohygrocybe nitrata, Czech Republic

Conservation status
- Vulnerable (IUCN 3.1)

Scientific classification
- Kingdom: Fungi
- Division: Basidiomycota
- Class: Agaricomycetes
- Order: Agaricales
- Family: Hygrophoraceae
- Genus: Neohygrocybe
- Species: N. nitrata

Binomial name
- Neohygrocybe nitrata (Pers.) Kovalenko(1989)

Synonyms
- Agaricus nitratus Pers. (1801); Hygrophorus nitratus (Pers.) Fr. (1874); Hygrocybe nitrata (Pers.) Wünsche (1877); Camarophyllus nitratus (Pers.) Ricken (1920)

= Neohygrocybe nitrata =

Nitrous waxcap

Species of fungus

Neohygrocybe nitrata is a species of agaric (gilled mushroom) in the family Hygrophoraceae. It has been given the recommended English name of nitrous waxcap, based on its smell. The species has a European distribution, occurring mainly in agriculturally unimproved grassland. Threats to its habitat have resulted in the species being assessed as globally "vulnerable" on the IUCN Red List of Threatened Species.

== Taxonomy ==
The species was first described in 1801 by mycologist Christiaan Hendrik Persoon as Agaricus nitratus. Czech mycologist Josef Herink transferred it to the genus Neohygrocybe in 1958, but this combination was not validly published. It was later validly combined by Alexander Kovalenko in 1989.

Recent molecular research, based on cladistic analysis of DNA sequences, has confirmed that Neohygrocybe nitrata is a distinct species but does not belong in Hygrocybe sensu stricto.

== Description ==
Basidiocarps are agaricoid, up to 60 mm (5 in) tall, the cap convex to flat, up to 70 mm (3 in) across. The cap surface is smooth, dry, sometimes breaking up into scales when old, grey-brown. The lamellae (gills) are waxy, pale grey to buff with whiter margins. The stipe (stem) is smooth, pale grey to buff, lacking a ring. The spore print is white, the spores (under a microscope) smooth, inamyloid, ellipsoid, measuring about 8 to 9 by 4.5 to 5.5 μm. Basidiocarps have a distinctly nitrous smell.

=== Similar species ===
Neohygrocybe pseudoingrata, recently described from the Czech Republic and Slovakia, has a similar nitrous smell, but basidiocarps are typically larger and paler with white stipes. The more widespread European Neohygrocybe ingrata has a context that stains reddish.

== Distribution and habitat ==
The Nitrous Waxcap is widespread but generally rare throughout Europe. Like other waxcaps, it occurs in old, agriculturally unimproved, short-sward grassland (pastures and lawns).

Recent research suggests waxcaps are neither mycorrhizal nor saprotrophic but may be associated with mosses.

== Conservation ==
Neohygrocybe nitrata is typical of waxcap grasslands, a declining habitat due to changing agricultural practices. As a result, the species is of global conservation concern and is listed as "vulnerable" on the IUCN Red List of Threatened Species. Neohygrocybe nitrata also appears on the official or provisional national red lists of threatened fungi in several European countries, including Croatia, Czech Republic, Denmark, Germany, and Norway.

== See also ==
- List of Hygrocybe species
- List of fungi by conservation status
