= Pseudotricholoma metapodium =

Conservation status
- Endangered (IUCN 3.1)

Scientific classification
- Kingdom: Fungi
- Division: Basidiomycota
- Class: Agaricomycetes
- Order: Agaricales
- Family: Tricholomataceae
- Genus: Pseudotricholoma
- Species: P. metapodium

Binomial name
- Pseudotricholoma metapodium (Fr.) Sánchez-García & Matheny (2014)

Synonyms
- Agaricus metapodius Fr. (1818); Hygrophorus metapodius Fr. (1838); Camarophyllus metapodius (Fr.) Wünsche (1877); Neohygrocybe metapodia (Fr.) Herink (1958); Hygrocybe metapodia (Fr.) Gams (1967); Porpoloma metapodium (Fr.) Singer (1973)

Species of fungus

Pseudotricholoma metapodium is a species of agaric (gilled mushroom) in the family Tricholomataceae. It has been given the recommended English name of mealy meadowcap. The species has a European distribution, occurring mainly in agriculturally unimproved grassland. Threats to its habitat have resulted in the mealy meadowcap being assessed as globally "endangered" on the IUCN Red List of Threatened Species.

== Taxonomy ==
The species was first described by Swedish mycologist Elias Magnus Fries in 1818 as Agaricus metapodius. Rolf Singer transferred it to Porpoloma in 1973, but subsequent molecular research, based on cladistic analysis of DNA sequences, found that the latter genus was polyphyletic with species belonging either to Porpoloma sensu stricto or the new genus Pseudotricholoma.

== Description ==
Basidiocarps are agaricoid, up to 90 mm (3.5 in) tall, the cap convex then flat, up to 100 mm (4 in) across. The cap surface is smooth, pale to dark grey-brown to reddish brown, often splitting at margin. The lamellae (gills) are very pale grey to brownish, bruising red then black. The stipe (stem) is smooth, finely fibrillose, similarly coloured to the pileus or paler, slowly bruising red then black, lacking a ring. The smell is mealy when cut. The spore print is white, the spores (under a microscope) ellipsoid to oblong, amyloid, measuring about 6 to 8 by 3 to 4 μm.

=== Similar species ===
In grassland, the common Lepista luscina can look similar, but is typically paler, does not change colour when bruised, and is microscopically distinct. The rare Neohygrocybe ovina does bruise red, but is typically blacker and is also microscopically distinct.

== Distribution and habitat ==
The mealy meadowcap is rare but widespread in northern and central Europe. It occurs in old, agriculturally unimproved, short-sward grassland (pastures and lawns).

== Conservation ==
Pseudotricholoma metapodium is typical of waxcap grasslands, a declining habitat due to changing agricultural practices. As a result, the species is of global conservation concern and is listed as "endangered" on the IUCN Red List of Threatened Species.
