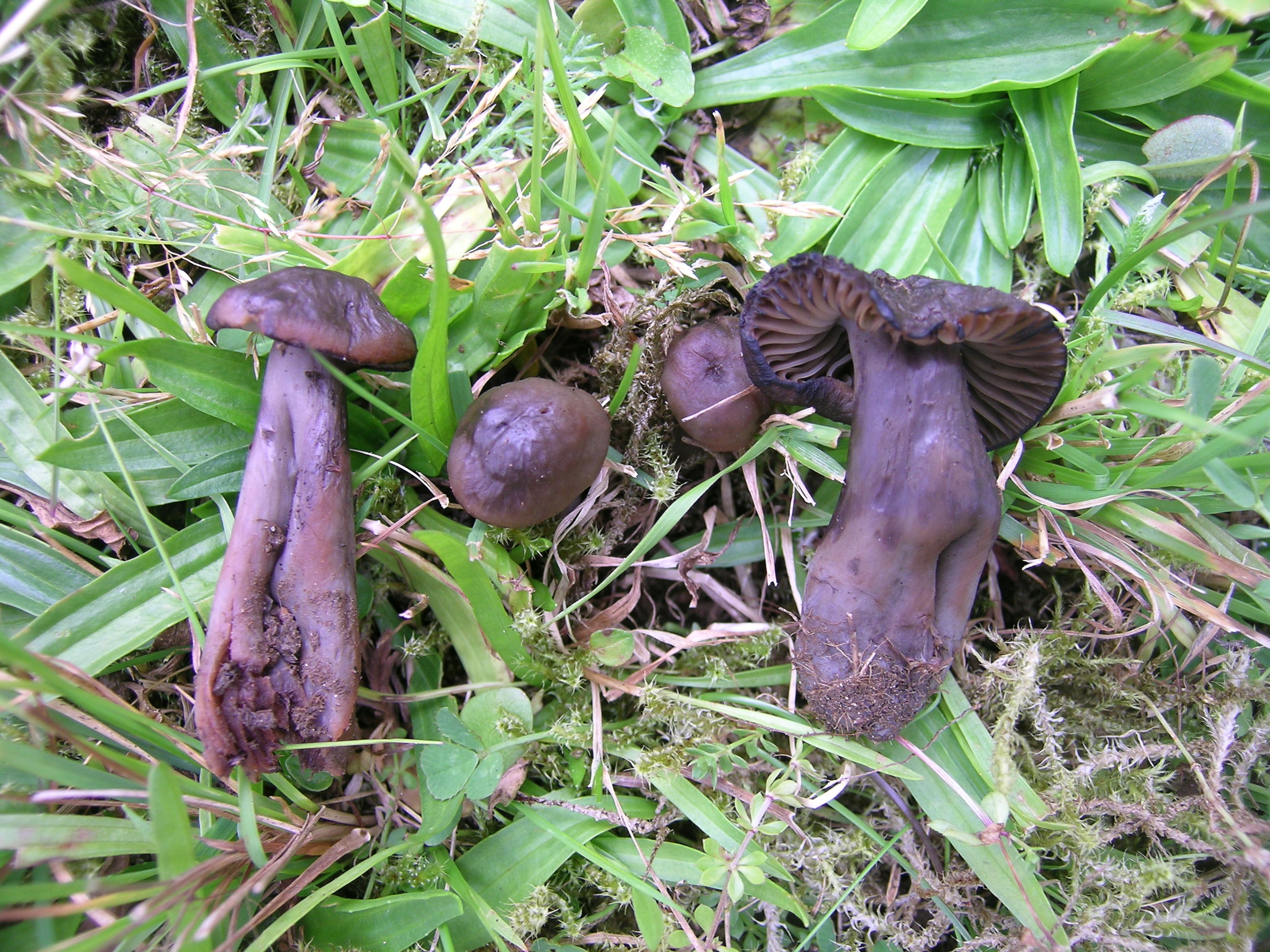
- Neohygrocybe ovina, Norway

Scientific classification
- Kingdom: Fungi
- Division: Basidiomycota
- Class: Agaricomycetes
- Order: Agaricales
- Family: Hygrophoraceae
- Genus: Neohygrocybe; Herink (1958)

Type species
- Neohygrocybe ovina (Bull.) Herink (1958)

Species
- Neohygrocybe griseonigra Neohygrocybe ingrata Neohygrocybe innata Neohygrocybe lawsonensis Neohygrocybe nitrata Neohygrocybe pseudoingrata Neohygrocybe squarrosa Neohygrocybe subovina

= Neohygrocybe =

Genus of fungi

Neohygrocybe is a genus of agaric fungi in the family Hygrophoraceae. Neohygrocybe species belong to a group known as waxcaps in English, sometimes also waxy caps in North America or waxgills in New Zealand. In Europe, Neohygrocybe species are typical of waxcap grasslands, a declining habitat due to changing agricultural practices. As a result, three species, Neohygrocybe ingrata, Neohygrocybe nitrata, and Neohygrocybe ovina, are of global conservation concern and are listed as "vulnerable" on the IUCN Red List of Threatened Species.

== Taxonomy ==
The genus was described by Czech mycologist Josef Herink in 1958. It was formerly synonymized with Hygrocybe by many authorities, but recent molecular research, based on cladistic analysis of DNA sequences, indicates that Neohygrocybe is monophyletic and forms a natural group distinct from Hygrocybe sensu stricto.

== Habitat and Distribution ==
In Europe, Neohygrocybe species are typically found in agriculturally unimproved, short-sward grasslands (including pastures and lawns). Elsewhere, they are most frequently found in woodland. The genus is cosmopolitan.
