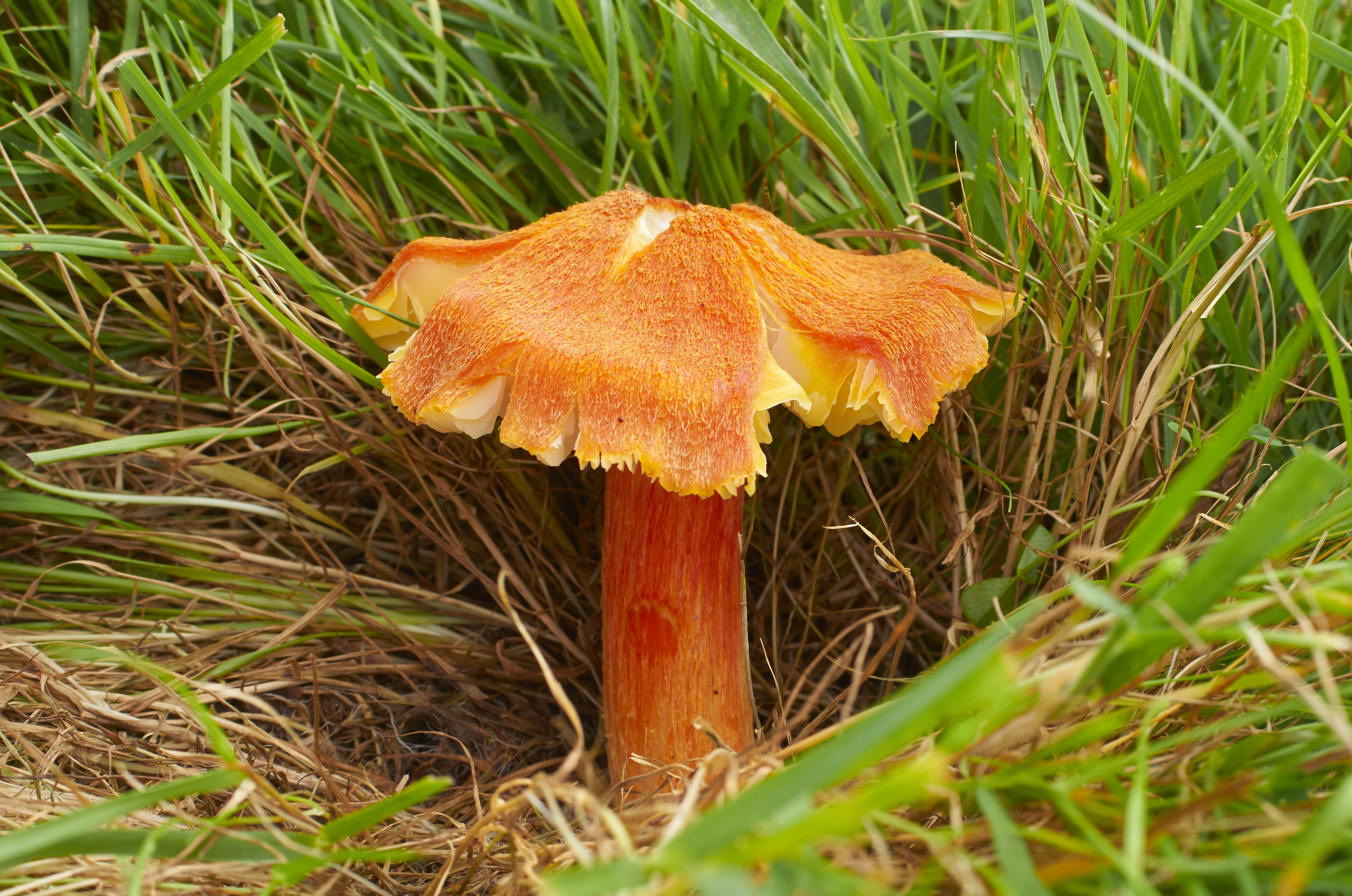

Conservation status
- Vulnerable (IUCN 3.1)

Scientific classification
- Kingdom: Fungi
- Division: Basidiomycota
- Class: Agaricomycetes
- Order: Agaricales
- Family: Hygrophoraceae
- Genus: Hygrocybe
- Species: H. intermedia

Binomial name
- Hygrocybe intermedia (Pass.) Fayod (1888 )

Synonyms
- Hygrophorus intermedius Pass. (1872); Godfrinia intermedia (Pass.) Herink (1958); Pseudohygrocybe intemedia (Pass.) Kovalenko (1988)

= Hygrocybe intermedia =

Species of fungus

Hygrocybe intermedia is a species of agaric (gilled mushroom) in the family Hygrophoraceae. It has been given the recommended English name of fibrous waxcap. The species has a European distribution, occurring mainly in agriculturally unimproved grassland. Threats to its habitat have resulted in the species being assessed as globally "vulnerable" on the IUCN Red List of Threatened Species.

== Taxonomy ==
The species was first described from Italy in 1872 by mycologist Giovanni Passerini as Hygrophorus intermedius. Swiss mycologist Victor Fayod transferred it to the genus Hygrocybe in 1889.

Recent molecular research, based on cladistic analysis of DNA sequences, has shown that Hygrocybe intermedia is distinct and belongs in Hygrocybe sensu stricto.

== Description ==
Basidiocarps are agaricoid, up to 150mm (6 in) tall, the cap conical at first, becoming flat when expanded, up to 110mm (4 in) across, often splitting at the margins. The cap surface is dry, radially fibrillose to coarsely fibrillose, orange to orange yellow. The lamellae (gills) are waxy, white to pale cap-coloured. The stipe (stem) is stout, dry and fibrous, pale cap-coloured with a whitish base, lacking a ring. The spore print is white, the spores (under a microscope) smooth, inamyloid, ellipsoid, c. 8.5 to 10 by 5 to 6.5μm.

The comparatively large size, colour, and stout, fibrous stipe are distinctive among European waxcaps.

== Distribution and habitat ==
The fibrous waxcap is widespread but generally rare throughout Europe. Like other European waxcaps, it typically occurs in old, agriculturally unimproved, short-sward grassland (pastures and lawns).

Recent research suggests waxcaps are neither mycorrhizal nor saprotrophic but may be associated with mosses.

== Conservation ==
Hygrocybe intermedia is typical of waxcap grasslands, a declining habitat due to changing agricultural practices. As a result, the species is of global conservation concern and is listed as "vulnerable" on the IUCN Red List of Threatened Species.

== See also ==
- List of Hygrocybe species
- List of fungi by conservation status
