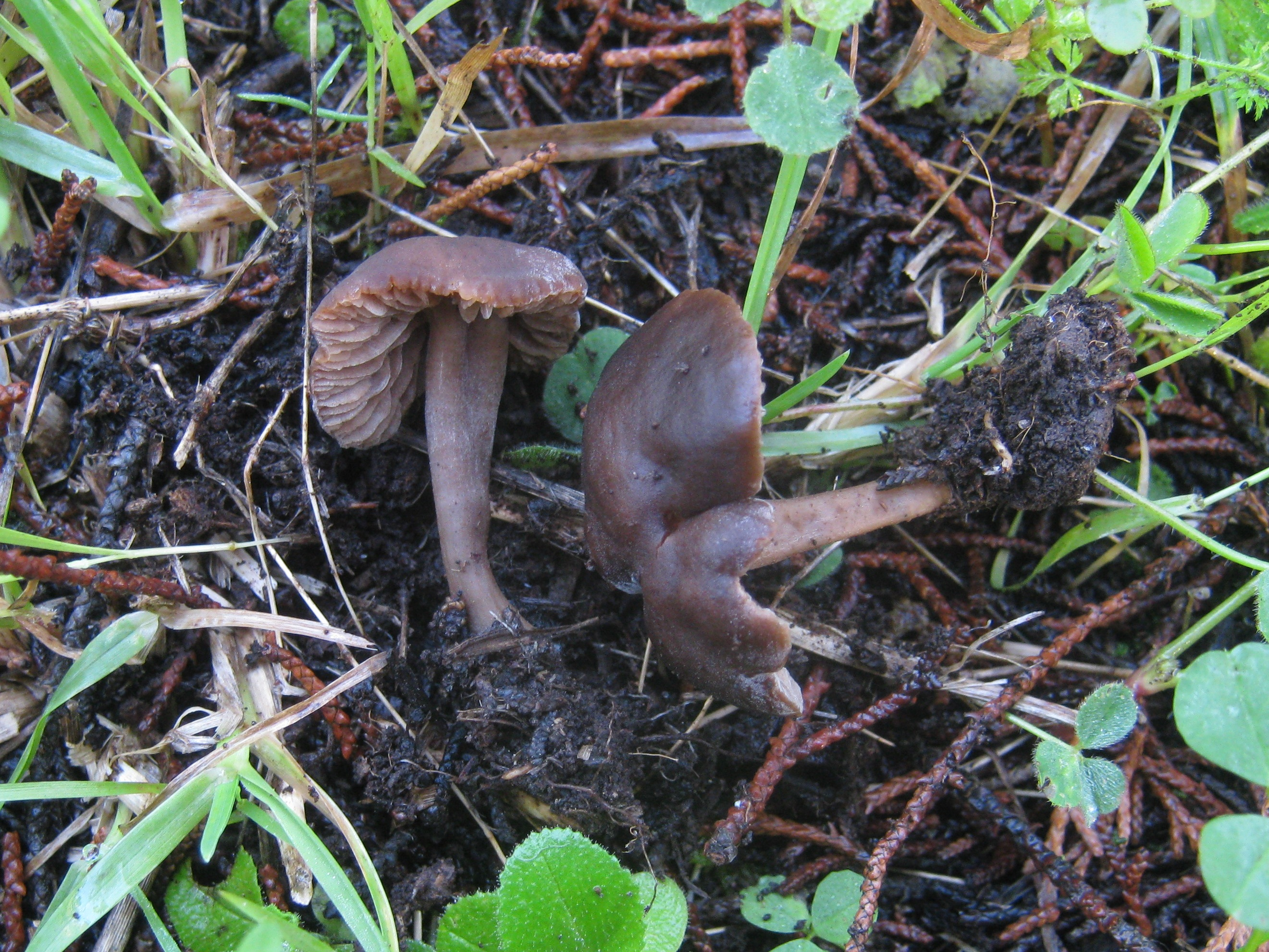

Conservation status
- Vulnerable (IUCN 3.1)

Scientific classification
- Kingdom: Fungi
- Division: Basidiomycota
- Class: Agaricomycetes
- Order: Agaricales
- Family: Hygrophoraceae
- Genus: Neohygrocybe
- Species: N. ovina

Binomial name
- Neohygrocybe ovina (Bull.) Herink (1958)

Synonyms
- Agaricus ovinus Bull. (1793); Camarophyllus ovinus (Bull.) P. Kumm. (1871); Hygrophorus ovinus (Bull.) Fr. (1838); Hygrocybe ovina (Bull.) Kühner (1926)

= Neohygrocybe ovina =

Blushing waxcap

Species of fungus

Neohygrocybe ovina is a species of agaric (gilled mushroom) in the family Hygrophoraceae. It has been given the recommended English name of blushing waxcap, since the lamellae (gills) and flesh turn pinkish red when bruised. The species has a European distribution, occurring mainly in agriculturally unimproved grassland. Threats to its habitat have resulted in the species being assessed as globally "vulnerable" on the IUCN Red List of Threatened Species.

== Taxonomy ==
The species was first described from France in 1793 by mycologist Jean Baptiste Bulliard as Agaricus ovinus. French mycologist Robert Kühner transferred it to the genus Hygrocybe in 1926.

Recent molecular research, based on cladistic analysis of DNA sequences, has confirmed that Hygrocybe ovina is a distinct species but does not belong in Hygrocybe sensu stricto. Instead, it has been moved into the related but separate genus Neohygrocybe, as already proposed on morphological grounds by Czech mycologist Josef Herink in 1958.

== Description ==
Basidiocarps are agaricoid, up to 120mm (5 in) tall, the cap hemispherical at first, becoming broadly convex when expanded, up to 90mm (3 in) across. The cap surface is smooth, dry, sometimes breaking into scales when old, dark grey to blackish. The lamellae (gills) are waxy, thick, and pale cap-coloured. The stipe (stem) is smooth, often compressed and furrowed, pale cap-coloured, lacking a ring. Gills and context turn pinkish red when bruised. The spore print is white, the spores (under a microscope) smooth, inamyloid, ellipsoid, c. 7.5 to 9 by 5 to 6μm.

== Distribution and habitat ==
The Blushing Waxcap is widespread but generally rare throughout Europe. A similar species, Neohygrocybe subovina, occurs in North America. Like most other European waxcaps, Neohygrocybe ovina occurs in old, agriculturally unimproved, short-sward grassland (pastures and lawns).

Recent research suggests waxcaps are neither mycorrhizal nor saprotrophic but may be associated with mosses.

== Conservation ==
Neohygrocybe ovina is typical of waxcap grasslands, a declining habitat due to changing agricultural practices. As a result, the species is of global conservation concern and is listed as "vulnerable" on the IUCN Red List of Threatened Species. Neohygrocybe ovina also appears on the official or provisional national red lists of threatened fungi in several European countries, including Croatia, Czech Republic, Denmark, Finland, Germany, Lithuania, Norway, and Sweden.

== See also ==
- List of Hygrocybe species
- List of fungi by conservation status
