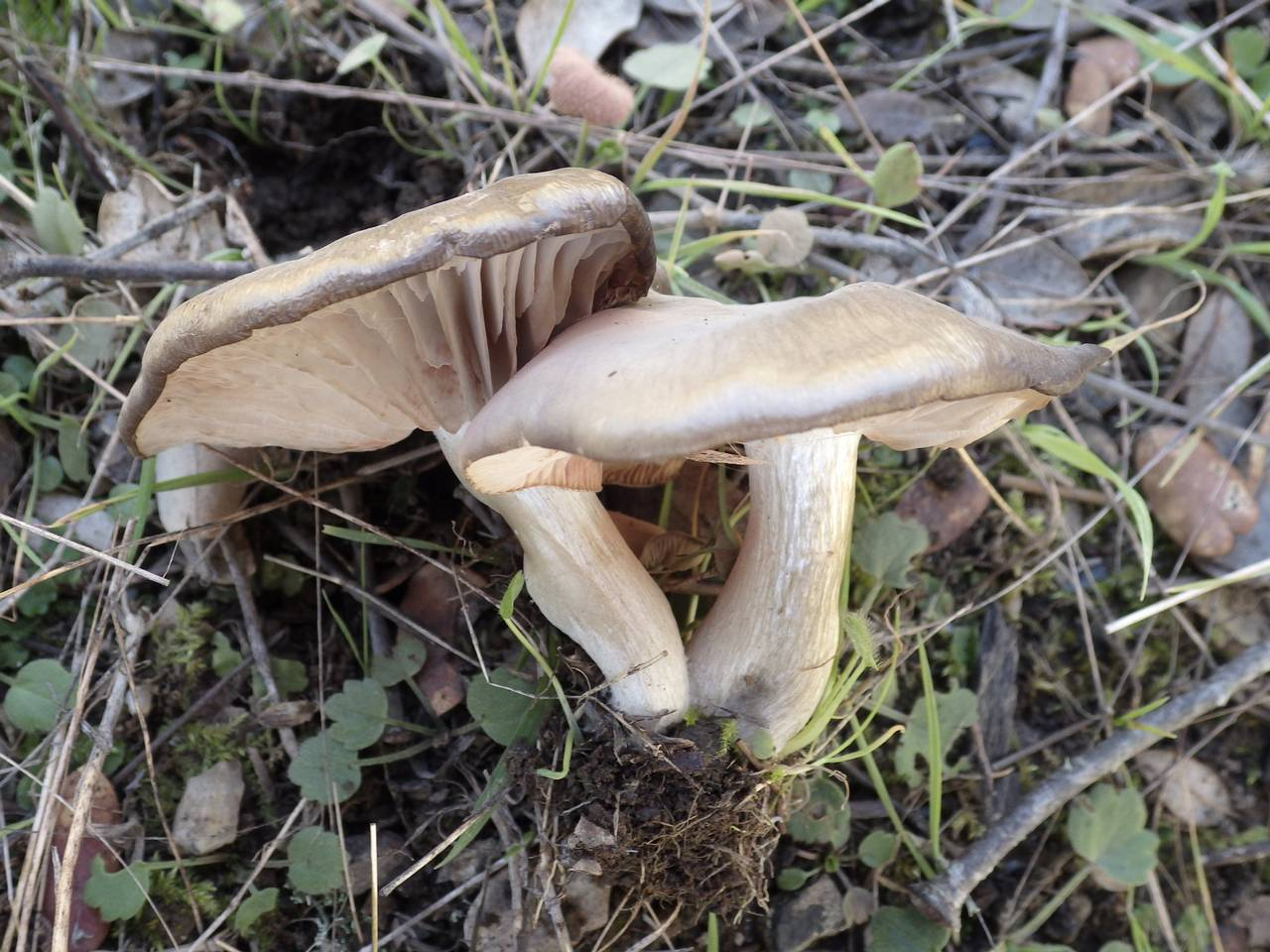
- Entoloma prunuloides, Portugal

Conservation status
- Vulnerable (IUCN 3.1)

Scientific classification
- Kingdom: Fungi
- Division: Basidiomycota
- Class: Agaricomycetes
- Order: Agaricales
- Family: Entolomataceae
- Genus: Entoloma
- Species: E. prunuloides

Binomial name
- Entoloma prunuloides (Fr.) Quél. (1872)

Synonyms
- Agaricus prunuloides Fr (1821); Hyporrhodius prunuloides (Fr.) Fr. (1827); Rhodophyllus prunuloides (Fr.) Quél. (1886)

= Entoloma prunuloides =

Mealy Pinkgill

Species of fungus

Entoloma prunuloides is a species of agaric (gilled mushroom) in the family Entolomataceae. It has been given the recommended English name of Mealy Pinkgill, based on its distinctive smell. The species has a European distribution, occurring mainly in agriculturally unimproved grassland. Threats to its habitat have resulted in the Mealy Pinkgill being assessed as globally "vulnerable" on the IUCN Red List of Threatened Species.

== Taxonomy ==
The species was first described by Swedish mycologist Elias Magnus Fries in 1821 as Agaricus prunuloides. French mycologist Lucien Quélet transferred it to the genus Entoloma in 1872.

== Description ==
Basidiocarps are agaricoid, up to 80 mm (3 in) tall, the cap convex to flat and broadly umbonate, up to 70 mm (2.75 in) across. The cap surface is smooth, finely fibrillose, cream to ochraceous grey. The lamellae (gills) are white becoming pink from the spores. The stipe (stem) is smooth, finely fibrillose, white, lacking a ring. The spore print is pink, the spores (under a microscope) multi-angled, inamyloid, measuring about 6.5 to 8 by 6.5 to 8 μm. The whole fungus has a distinctive, mealy smell.

=== Similar species ===
Entoloma ochreoprunuloides has the same mealy smell but differs in its darker, grey-brown cap.

== Distribution and habitat ==
The Mealy Pinkgill is rare but widespread in Europe. Like many other European pinkgills, it occurs in old, agriculturally unimproved, short-sward grassland (pastures and lawns).

== Conservation ==
Entoloma prunuloides is typical of waxcap grasslands, a declining habitat due to changing agricultural practices. As a result, the species is of global conservation concern and is listed as "vulnerable" on the IUCN Red List of Threatened Species.
