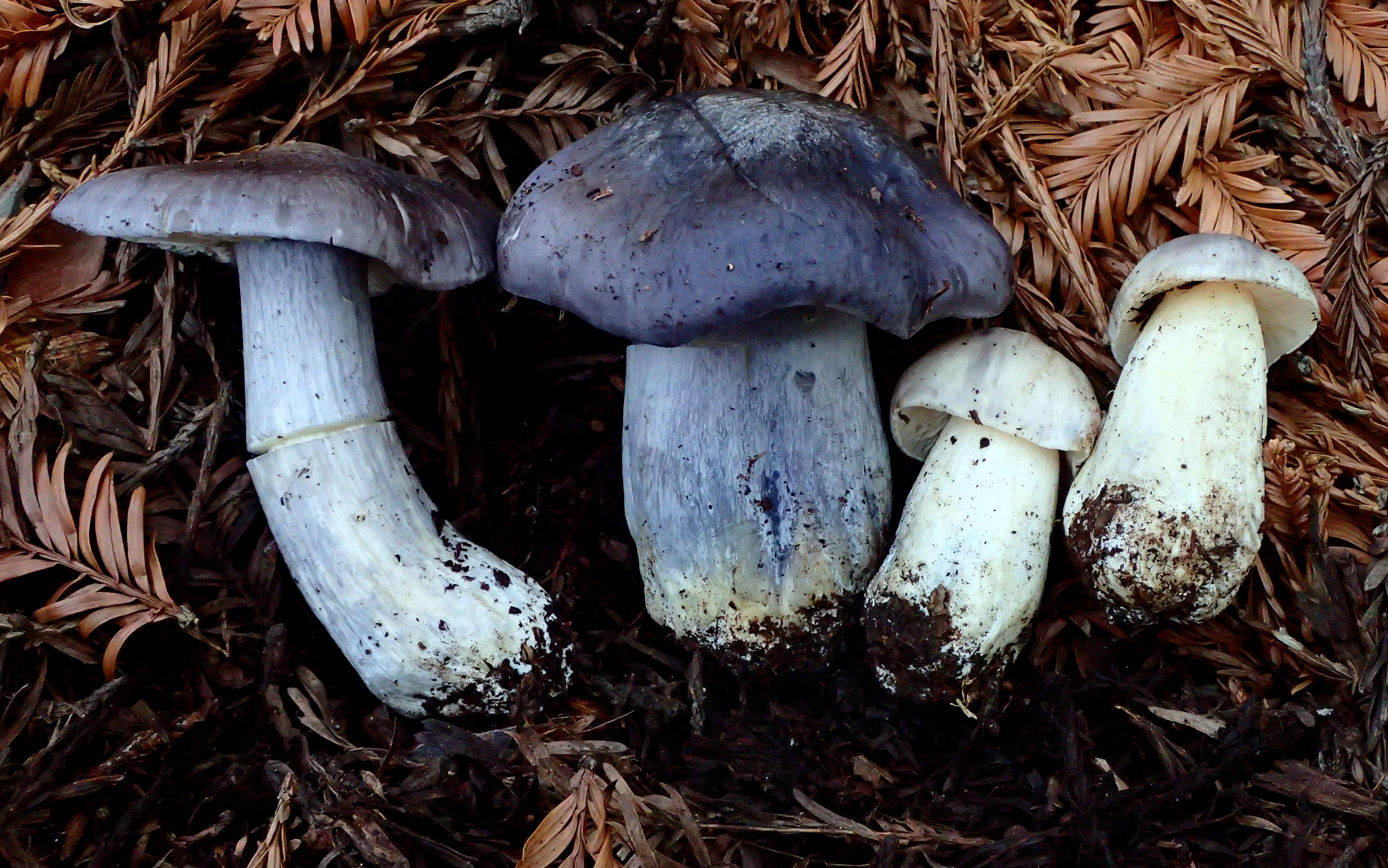
- Entoloma medianox, Henry Cowell Redwoods State Park, California

Scientific classification
- Kingdom: Fungi
- Division: Basidiomycota
- Class: Agaricomycetes
- Order: Agaricales
- Family: Entolomataceae
- Genus: Entoloma
- Species: E. medianox

Binomial name
- Entoloma medianox C.F. Schwarz

= Entoloma medianox =

Species of fungus

Entoloma medianox is a species of agaric (gilled mushroom) in the family Entolomataceae. It is known from western North America, where it was previously referred to the European species Entoloma bloxamii or E. madidum. Molecular research, based on cladistic analysis of DNA sequences, has, however, shown that Entoloma medianox is distinct.

== Description ==
The fungus produces a striking, blue, mushroom-shaped fruiting body (basidiocarp), between August and November. The smooth cap measures 5–15 cm (2–6 in) and has a broad swelling in the centre (known as a boss or umbo). The tightly packed, white gills on the underside of the cap contrast well with the blue colour of the fungus; they become more salmon-pink as they age. The solid stipe of the mushroom ranges from 5–10 cm (2–4 in) tall and 1–3 cm wide, and is also blue with a whitish base. The spore print is pink to cinnamon-coloured.

Tricholoma griseoviolaceum is similar, but lacks blue or pink tones in the gills.

== See also ==
- List of Entoloma species
