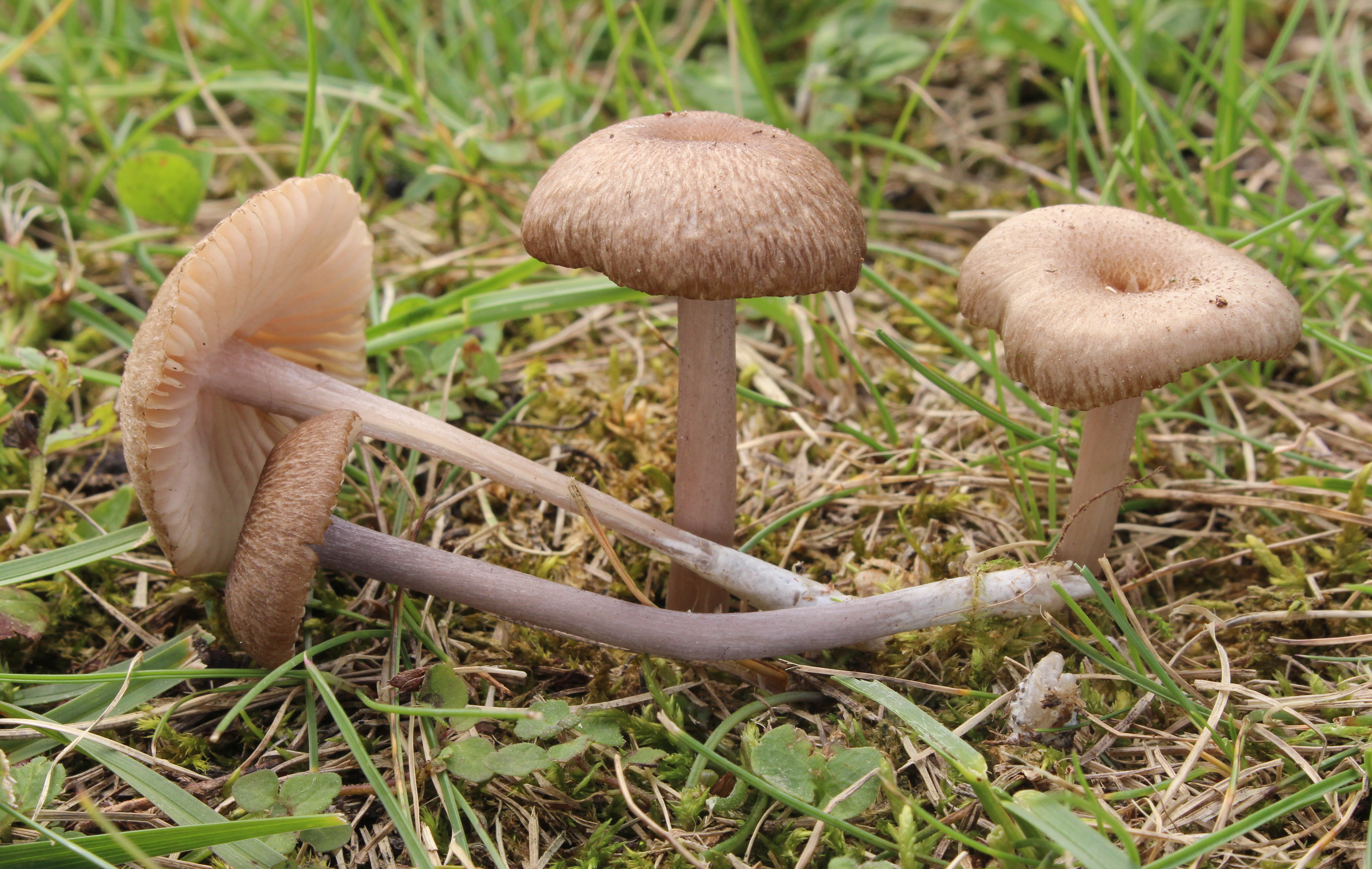
- Entoloma griseocyaneum, Germany

Conservation status
- Vulnerable (IUCN 3.1)

Scientific classification
- Kingdom: Fungi
- Division: Basidiomycota
- Class: Agaricomycetes
- Order: Agaricales
- Family: Entolomataceae
- Genus: Entoloma
- Species: E. griseocyaneum

Binomial name
- Entoloma griseocyaneum (Fr.) P. Kumm. (1871)

Synonyms
- Agaricus griseocyaneus Fr. (1821); Hyporrhodius griseocyaneus (Fr.) J. Schröt. (1889); Rhodophyllus griseocyaneus (Fr.) Quél. (1886); Leptonia griseocyanea (Fr.) P.D. Orton (1960)

= Entoloma griseocyaneum =

Felted Pinkgill

Species of fungus

Entoloma griseocyaneum is a species of agaric (gilled mushroom) in the family Entolomataceae. It has been given the recommended English name of Felted Pinkgill. The species has a European distribution, occurring mainly in agriculturally unimproved grassland. Threats to its habitat have resulted in the Felted Pinkgill being assessed as globally "vulnerable" on the IUCN Red List of Threatened Species.

== Taxonomy ==
The species was first described by Swedish mycologist Elias Magnus Fries in 1821 as Agaricus griseocyaneus. German mycologist Paul Kummer transferred it to the genus Entoloma in 1871.

== Description ==
Basidiocarps are agaricoid, up to 120 mm (4.75 in) tall, the cap conical to convex then flat to broadly umbonate, up to 50 mm (2 in) across. The cap surface is finely fibrillose, yellow-brown to sepia. The lamellae (gills) are white becoming pink from the spores. The stipe (stem) is smooth, finely fibrillose, typically pale grey-blue, lacking a ring. The spore print is pink, the spores (under a microscope) multi-angled, inamyloid, measuring about 9 to 13.5 by 6.5 to 8 μm.

=== Similar species ===
Entoloma isborscanum is superficially similar, but can be distinguished microscopically by having a sterile lamella edge with abundant cheilocystidia. Entoloma scabropellis, which lacks blue colours on the stipe, is said to be a synonym of Entoloma griseocyaneum based on DNA analysis.

== Distribution and habitat ==
The Felted Pinkgill is rare but widespread in Europe. Like many other European pinkgills, it occurs in old, agriculturally unimproved, short-sward grassland (pastures and lawns).

== Conservation ==
Entoloma griseocyaneum is typical of waxcap grasslands, a declining habitat due to changing agricultural practices. As a result, the species is of global conservation concern and is listed as "vulnerable" on the IUCN Red List of Threatened Species.
