= Neohygrocybe pseudoingrata =

Scientific classification
- Kingdom: Fungi
- Division: Basidiomycota
- Class: Agaricomycetes
- Order: Agaricales
- Family: Hygrophoraceae
- Genus: Neohygrocybe
- Species: N. pseudoingrata

Binomial name
- Neohygrocybe pseudoingrata Fuljer, Zajac, Boertmann, Szabóová, Kautmanová (2022)

Species of fungus

Neohygrocybe pseudoingrata is a species of agaric (gilled mushroom) in the family Hygrophoraceae.

== Distribution ==
The species is found in agriculturally unimproved, mesic grassland on acidic, neutral, and calcareous soils. It has been recorded in Slovakia and the Czech Republic.

== Description ==
The species is pale greyish in colour. It has robust sporocarps. It has a distinct nitrous smell. The surface of the pileus is smooth or somewhat fibrillose.
