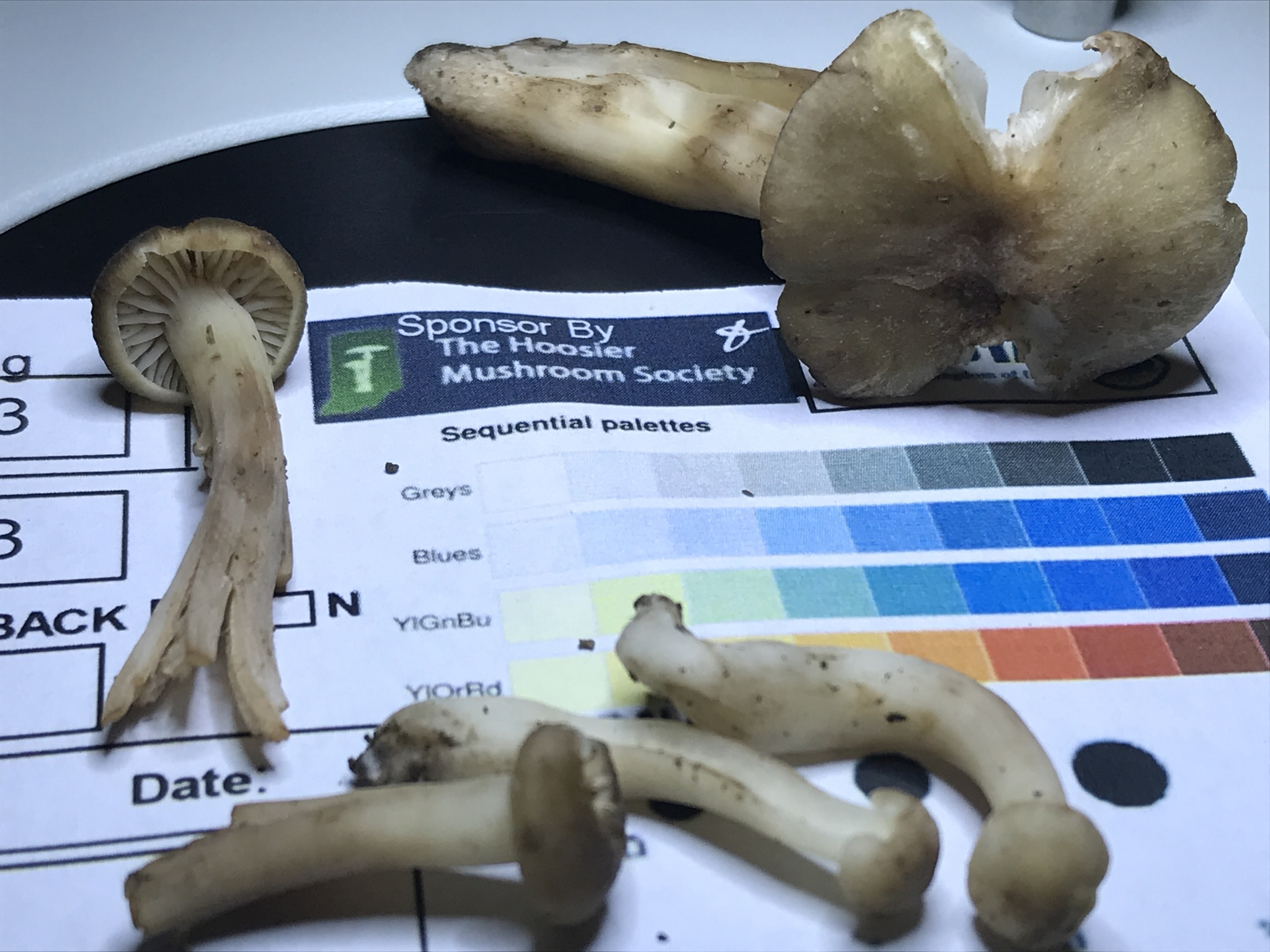

Conservation status
- Vulnerable (IUCN 3.1)

Scientific classification
- Kingdom: Fungi
- Division: Basidiomycota
- Class: Agaricomycetes
- Order: Agaricales
- Family: Hygrophoraceae
- Genus: Neohygrocybe
- Species: N. ingrata

Binomial name
- Neohygrocybe ingrata (J.P.Jensen & F.H.Møller) Herink (1958)

Synonyms
- Hygrocybe ingrata J.P.Jensen & F.H.Møller (1945)

= Neohygrocybe ingrata =

Species of fungus

Neohygrocybe ingrata
- Mycological characteristics
- Gills on hymenium
- Cap is convex or flat
- Stipe is bare
- Spore print is white
- Edibility is unknown

Neohygrocybe ingrata is a species of agaric (gilled mushroom) in the family Hygrophoraceae. It has been given the recommended English name of dingy waxcap. The species has a European distribution, occurring mainly in agriculturally unimproved grassland. Threats to its habitat have resulted in the species being assessed as globally "vulnerable" on the IUCN Red List of Threatened Species.

== Taxonomy ==
The species was first described as Hygrocybe ingrata from the Faroe Islands in 1945. Molecular research, based on cladistic analysis of DNA sequences, has, however, shown that it does not belong in Hygrocybe sensu stricto. Instead, the species has been moved into the related but separate genus Neohygrocybe, as already proposed on morphological grounds by Czech mycologist Josef Herink in 1958.

== Description ==
Basidiocarps are agaricoid, up to 110 mm (4 in) tall, the cap convex becoming flat, up to 60 mm (2.5 in) across. The cap surface is smooth, dry, often uneven, buff to yellowish brown, darker brown when old. The lamellae (gills) are waxy, thick, cream becoming pale brownish. The stipe (stem) is smooth, cream becoming brownish when old, lacking a ring. When cut, the whitish flesh turns slowly reddish brown and has a slightly chemical smell. The spore print is white, the spores (under a microscope) smooth, inamyloid, ellipsoid, measuring about 7 to 9 by 5 to 6.5.5 μm.

== Distribution and habitat ==
The dingy waxcap is widespread but generally rare throughout Europe. Like most other European waxcaps, it occurs in old, agriculturally unimproved, short-sward grassland (pastures and lawns).

Recent research suggests waxcaps are neither mycorrhizal nor saprotrophic but may be associated with mosses.

== Conservation ==
Neohygrocybe ingrata is typical of waxcap grasslands, a declining habitat due to changing agricultural practices. As a result, the species is of global conservation concern and is listed as "vulnerable" on the IUCN Red List of Threatened Species. The species is included in national Red Lists of 13 European countries and is regarded as (critically) endangered in Croatia, Czech Republic, Denmark, Finland, France, Germany, Lithuania, Poland, and Switzerland.

== See also ==
- List of fungi by conservation status
