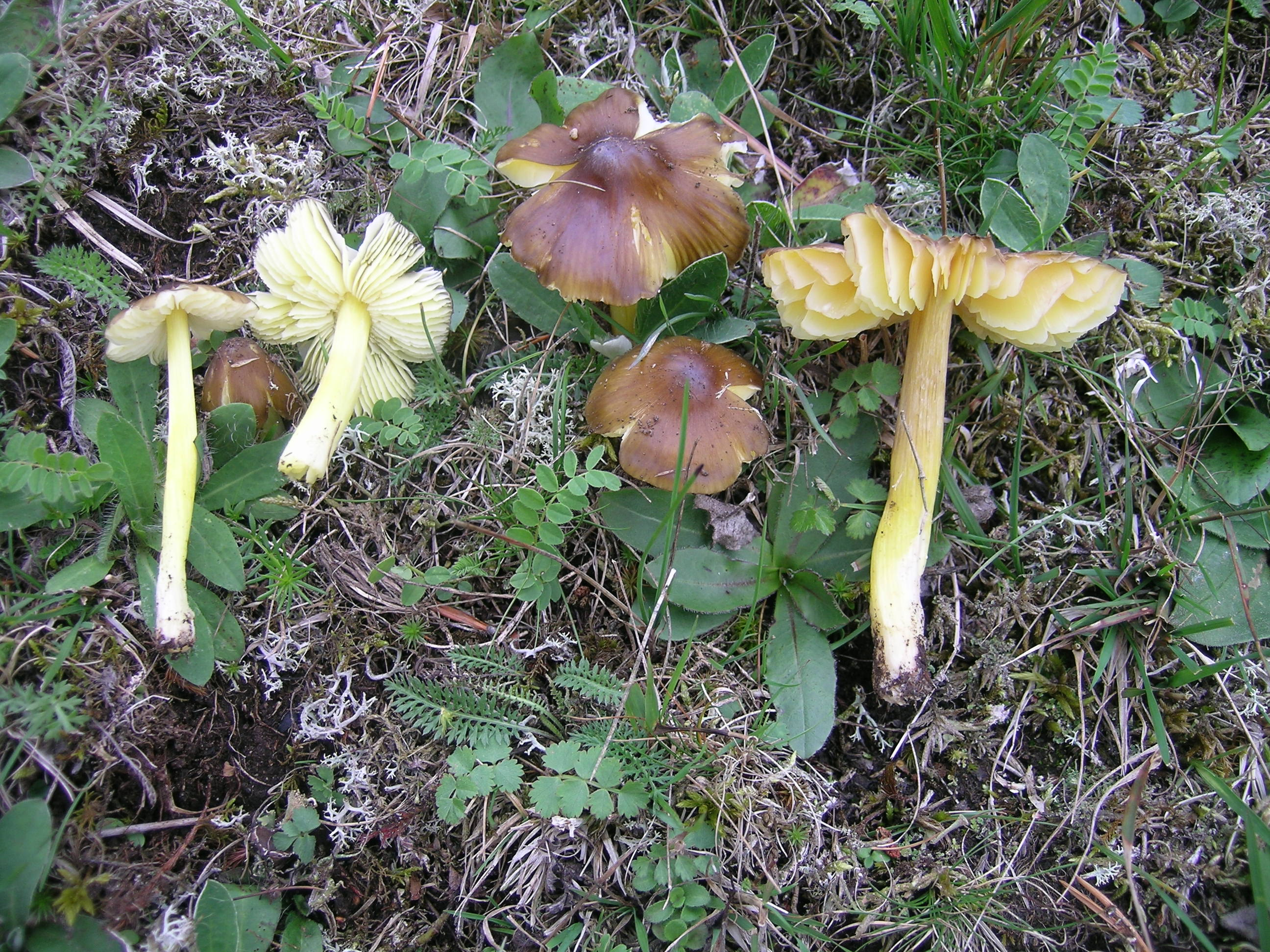

Conservation status
- Vulnerable (IUCN 3.1)

Scientific classification
- Kingdom: Fungi
- Division: Basidiomycota
- Class: Agaricomycetes
- Order: Agaricales
- Family: Hygrophoraceae
- Genus: Hygrocybe
- Species: H. spadicea

Binomial name
- Hygrocybe spadicea (Scop.) P. Karst. (1879)

Synonyms
- Agaricus spadiceus Scop. (1772); Hygrophorus spadiceus (Scop.) Fr. (1838); Godfrinia spadicea (Scop.) Herink (1958)

= Hygrocybe spadicea =

Date waxcap

Species of fungus

Hygrocybe spadicea is a species of agaric (gilled mushroom) in the family Hygrophoraceae. It has been given the recommended English name of Date Waxcap. The species has a European distribution, occurring mainly in agriculturally unimproved grassland. Threats to its habitat have resulted in the species being assessed as globally "vulnerable" on the IUCN Red List of Threatened Species.

== Taxonomy ==
The species was first described from Carniola (present-day Slovenia) in 1772 by naturalist Giovanni Antonio Scopoli as Agaricus spadiceus. Finnish mycologist Petter Adolf Karsten transferred it to the genus Hygrocybe in 1879.

Recent molecular research, based on cladistic analysis of DNA sequences, has confirmed that Hygrocybe spadicea is a distinct species and belongs in Hygrocybe sensu stricto.

== Description ==
The basidiocarps are agaricoid, up to 9 cm (5 in) tall, the cap conical at first, retaining an acute or distinct umbo when expanded, up to 8 cm (3 in) across, often splitting at the margins. The cap surface is smooth, dry, and radially fibrillose, brown and typically darker at the apex. The lamellae (gills) are waxy, yellow to yellow-orange. The stipe (stem) is smooth, somewhat fibrillose, yellow at first with brownish streaks when older, lacking a ring. The spore print is white, the spores (under a microscope) smooth, inamyloid, ellipsoid, measuring about 9 to 12 by 5 to 7 μm.

== Distribution and habitat ==
The species is widespread but generally rare throughout Europe. It has also been reported from Central Asia (Kazakhstan), but its identification has not been confirmed. Like other waxcaps, it occurs in old, agriculturally unimproved, short-sward grassland (pastures and lawns).

Recent research suggests waxcaps are neither mycorrhizal nor saprotrophic but may be associated with mosses.

== Conservation ==
Hygrocybe spadicea is typical of waxcap grasslands, a declining habitat due to changing agricultural practices. As a result, the species is of global conservation concern and is listed as "vulnerable" on the IUCN Red List of Threatened Species. Hygrocybe spadicea also appears on the official or provisional national red lists of threatened fungi in several European countries, including Croatia, Czech Republic, Denmark, Estonia (where it is listed as "extinct"), Finland, Germany, Great Britain, Norway, and Sweden.

== See also ==
- List of Hygrocybe species
- List of fungi by conservation status
