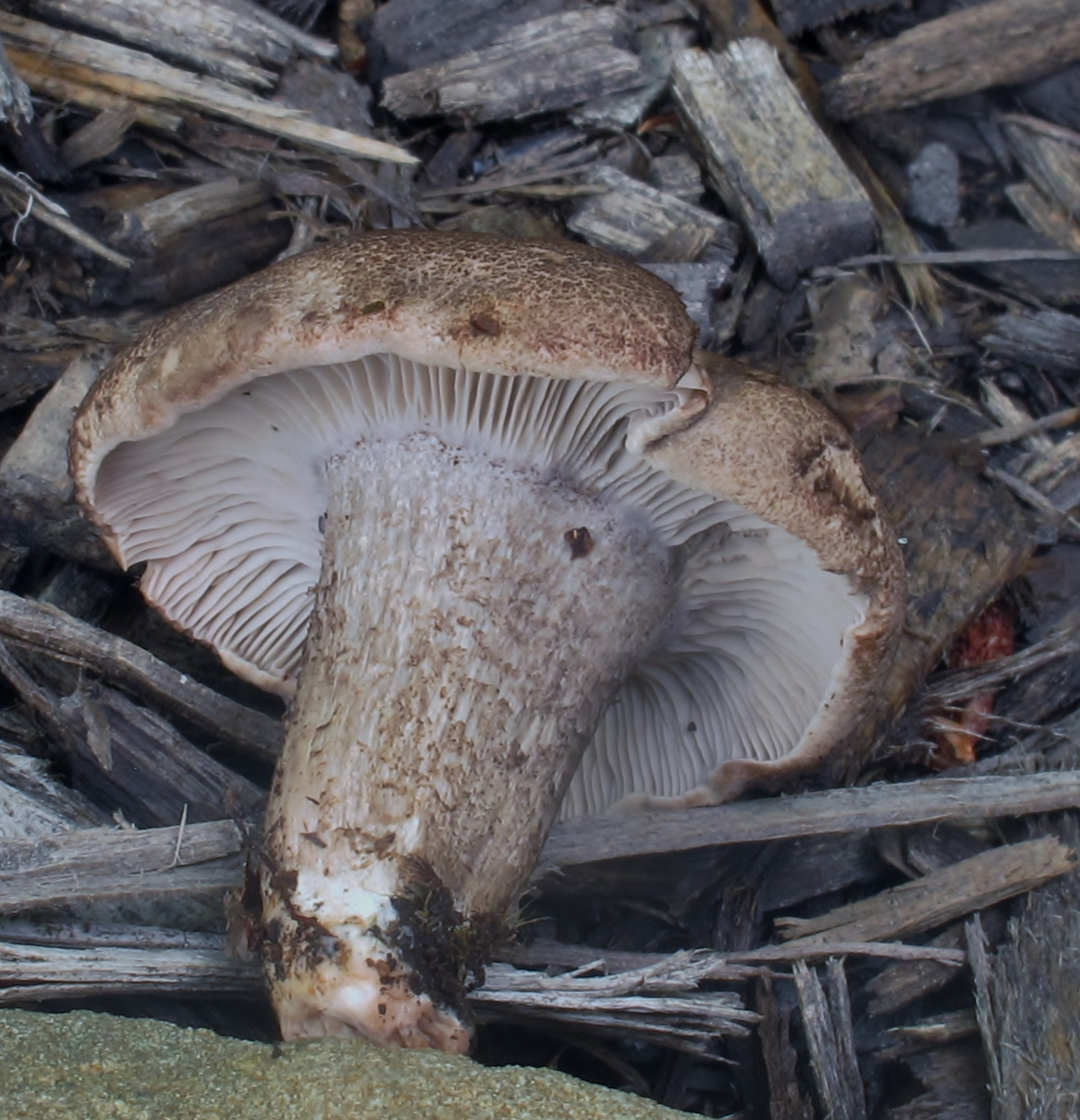

Scientific classification
- Domain: Eukaryota
- Kingdom: Fungi
- Division: Basidiomycota
- Class: Agaricomycetes
- Order: Agaricales
- Family: Tricholomataceae
- Genus: Pseudotricholoma
- Species: P. umbrosum

Binomial name
- Pseudotricholoma umbrosum (A.H.Sm. & M.B.Walters) Sánchez-García & Matheny (2014)

Synonyms
- Tricholoma umbrosum A.H.Sm. & M.B.Walters (1943); Cantharellula umbrosa (A.H.Sm. & M.B.Walters) Singer (1951); Porpoloma umbrosum (A.H.Sm. & M.B.Walters) Singer (1961); Porpoloma elytroides var. umbrosum (A.H.Sm. & M.B.Walters) Bon (1990)

= Pseudotricholoma umbrosum =

Species of fungus

Pseudotricholoma umbrosum, commonly known as the amyloid tricholoma, is a species of fungus in the family Tricholomataceae, and the type species of the genus Pseudotricholoma. It was first described scientifically by mycologists Alexander H. Smith and Maurice B. Walters in 1943 as a species of Tricholoma. Rolf Singer transferred it to Porpoloma (subgenus Pseudotricholoma) in 1962. The mushroom is found in North America, where it fruits singly or in small groups under conifer trees. Although it resembles a Tricholoma species, it is distinguished from that genus by its amyloid spores.
