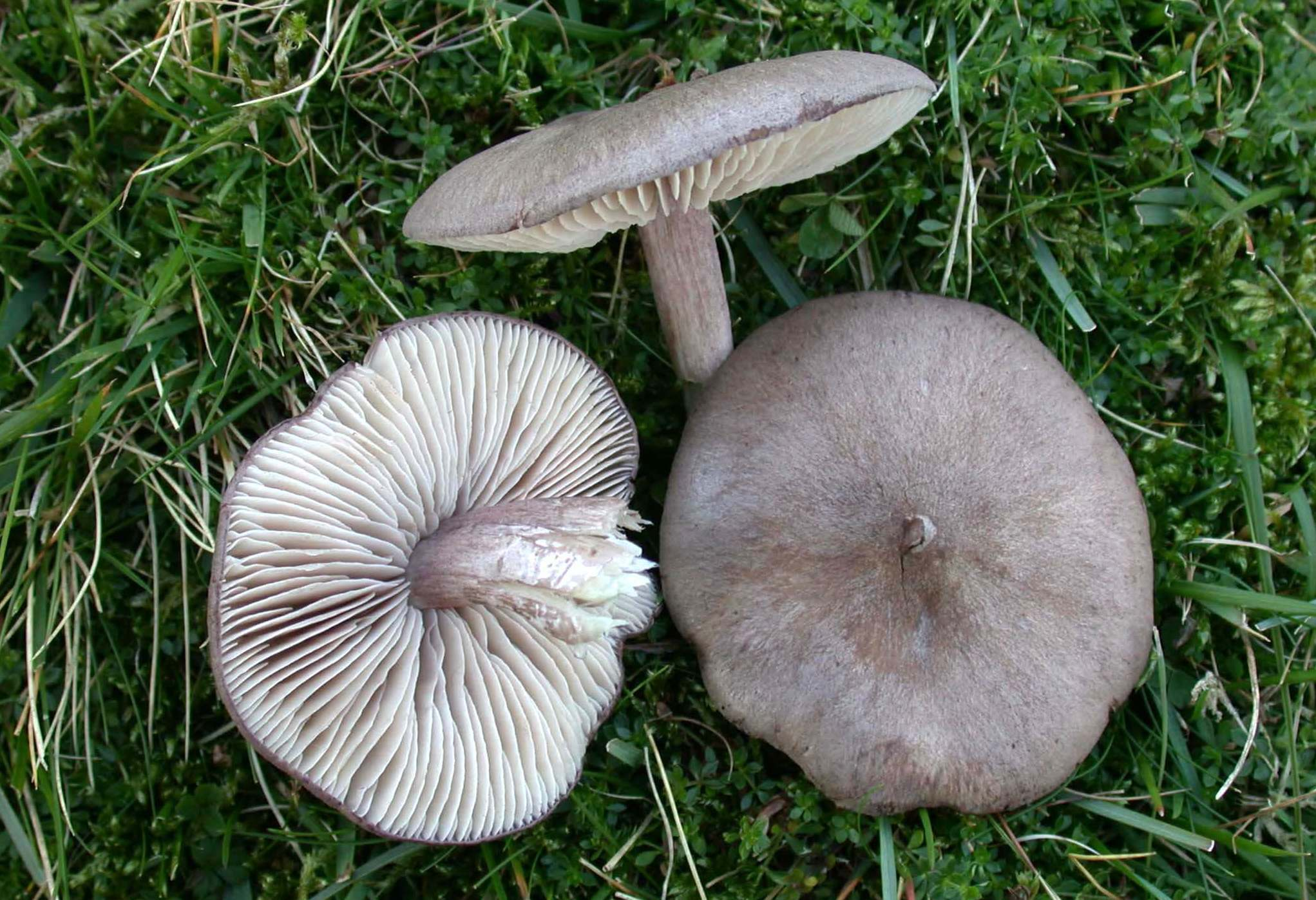
- Entoloma porphyrophaeum, England

Conservation status
- Vulnerable (IUCN 3.1)

Scientific classification
- Kingdom: Fungi
- Division: Basidiomycota
- Class: Agaricomycetes
- Order: Agaricales
- Family: Entolomataceae
- Genus: Entoloma
- Species: E. porphyrophaeum

Binomial name
- Entoloma porphyrophaeum (Fr.) P. Karst. (1879)

Synonyms
- Agaricus porphyrophaeus Fr (1857); Hyporrhodius porphyrophaeus (Fr.) Migula (1912); Rhodophyllus porphyrophaeus (Fr.) J.E. Lange (1921); Leptonia porphyrophaea (Fr.) Largent (1977); Trichopilus porphyrophaeus (Fr.) P.D. Orton (1991)

= Entoloma porphyrophaeum =

Lilac Pinkgill

Species of fungus

Entoloma porphyrophaeum is a species of agaric (gilled mushroom) in the family Entolomataceae. It has been given the recommended English name of Lilac Pinkgill. The species has a European distribution, occurring mainly in agriculturally unimproved grassland. Entoloma porphyrophaeum has been reported from North America, but at least some of these reports represent a distinct species, Entoloma canadense. Threats to its habitat have resulted in the Lilac Pinkgill being assessed as globally "vulnerable" on the IUCN Red List of Threatened Species.

== Taxonomy ==
The species was first described by Swedish mycologist Elias Magnus Fries in 1857 as Agaricus porphyrophaeus, the epithet derived from Ancient Greek πορφύρα ("purple") and φαιός ("dusky"). Finnish mycologist Petter Adolf Karsten transferred it to the genus Entoloma in 1879.

== Description ==
Basidiocarps are agaricoid, up to 175 mm (7 in) tall, the cap conical at first becoming convex to flat and broadly umbonate, up to 145 mm (5.5 in) across. The cap surface is smooth, finely fibrillose, lilac to purple-brown becoming brown. The lamellae (gills) are white to cream becoming pink from the spores. The stipe (stem) is smooth, finely fibrillose, cap-coloured or paler, lacking a ring. The spore print is pink, the spores (under a microscope) multi-angled, inamyloid, measuring about 8 to 12 by 6 to 8 μm. The cheilocystidia are rostrate (with a simple apical projection) to capitate (with a spherical apical projection).

=== Similar species ===
Entoloma porphyrophaeum belongs in the "Trichopilus" group of Entoloma species and is similar to the commoner Entoloma jubatum, which is typically smaller and darker with distinctly brown lamellae. Entoloma fuscomarginatum and E, elodes are species of Sphagnum and peat bogs, the former with a brown edge to the lamellae.

== Distribution and habitat ==
The Lilac Pinkgill is rare but widespread in Europe. Like many other European pinkgills, it occurs in old, agriculturally unimproved, short-sward grassland (pastures and lawns).

== Conservation ==
Entoloma porphyrophaeum is typical of waxcap grasslands, a declining habitat due to changing agricultural practices. As a result, the species is of global conservation concern and is listed as "vulnerable" on the IUCN Red List of Threatened Species.
