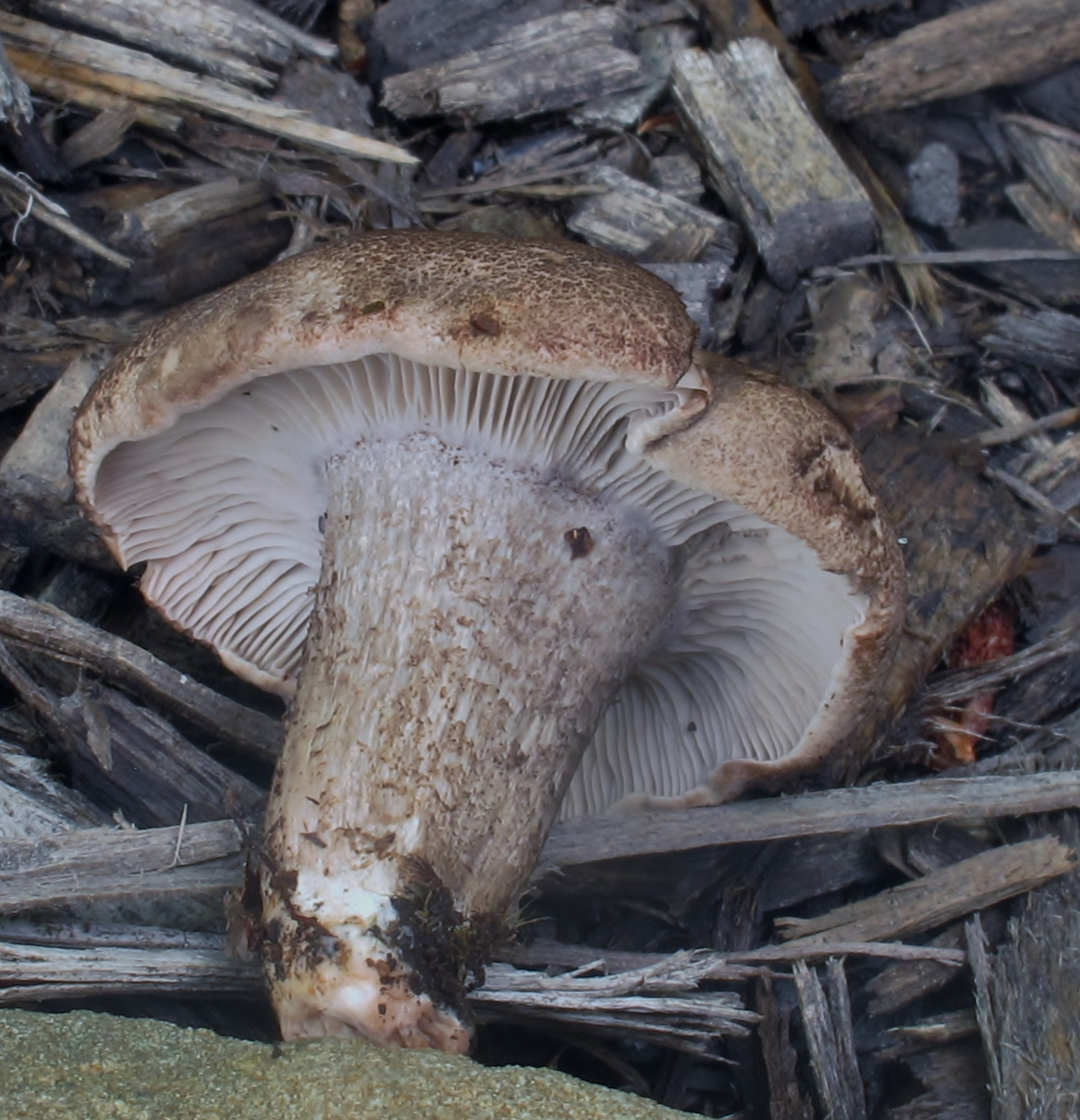
- Pseudotricholoma umbrosum, Ohio, USA

Scientific classification
- Kingdom: Fungi
- Division: Basidiomycota
- Class: Agaricomycetes
- Order: Agaricales
- Family: Tricholomataceae
- Genus: Pseudotricholoma (Singer) Sánchez-García & Matheny (2014)

Type species
- Pseudotricholoma umbrosum (A.H.Sm. & M.B.Walters) Sánchez-García & Matheny (2014)

Species
- Pseudotricholoma metapodium; Pseudotricholoma umbrosum

= Pseudotricholoma =

Genus of fungi

Pseudotricholoma is a genus of fungi in the family Tricholomataceae. The genus contains three species known from North America, Europe, and the Azores. Basidiocarps (fruit bodies) resemble those of the genus Tricholoma, with a dry fibrillose pileus and white to brown lamellae that have adnate to emarginate attachment and stain reddish when damaged, eventually turning black. Microscopically, the basidiospores are smooth, ellipsoid to ellipsoid-oblong, thin-walled and amyloid. Cheilocystidia are rare to absent and pleurocystidia are absent. The pileipellis is a cutis and clamp connections are present. Species in Pseudotricholoma are found on soil in grasslands and woods. They are probably biotrophic, and may be ectomycorrhizal.

== Etymology ==
Pseudotricholoma means "false Tricholoma".

== See also ==
- List of Tricholomataceae genera
