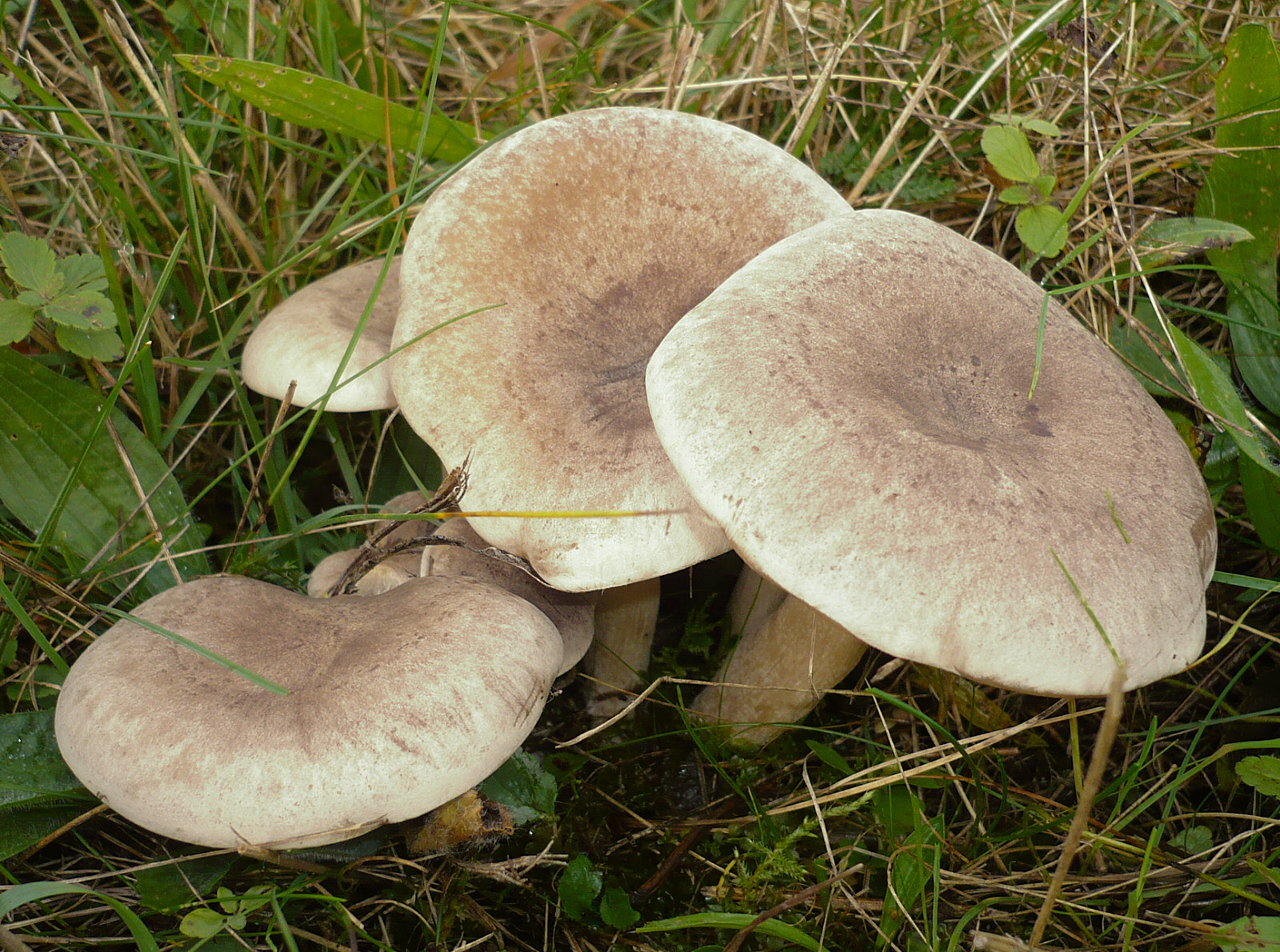

Scientific classification
- Domain: Eukaryota
- Kingdom: Fungi
- Division: Basidiomycota
- Class: Agaricomycetes
- Order: Agaricales
- Family: Tricholomataceae
- Genus: Lepista
- Species: L. luscina

Binomial name
- Lepista luscina (Fr.) Singer

= Lepista luscina =

Species of fungus

Lepista luscina is a species of fungus belonging to the family Tricholomataceae.

It has cosmopolitan distribution.
