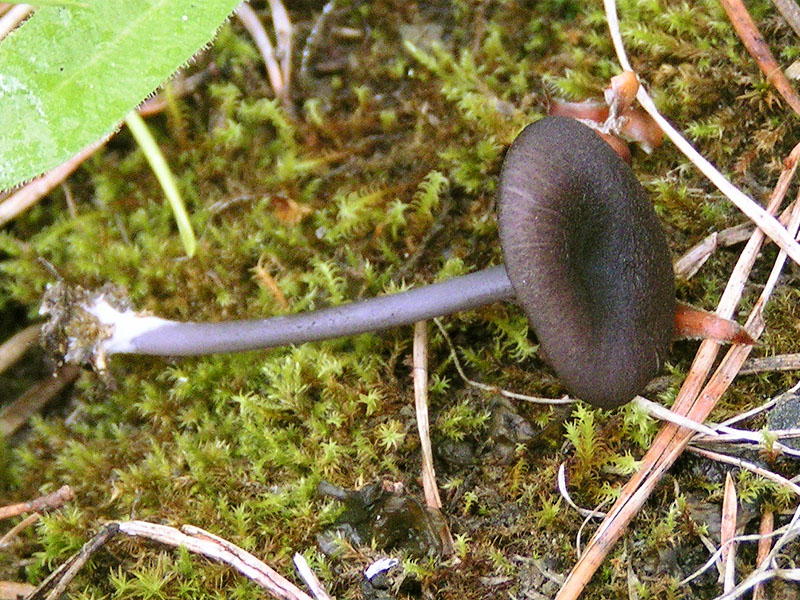

Scientific classification
- Kingdom: Fungi
- Division: Basidiomycota
- Class: Agaricomycetes
- Order: Agaricales
- Family: Entolomataceae
- Genus: Entoloma
- Species: E. mougeotii

Binomial name
- Entoloma mougeotii (Fries) Hesler, 1967

= Entoloma mougeotii =

Species of fungus

Entoloma mougeotii is a species of fungus belonging to the family Entolomataceae.

Synonym:

- Eccilia mougeotii Fr., 1873 (= basionym)
