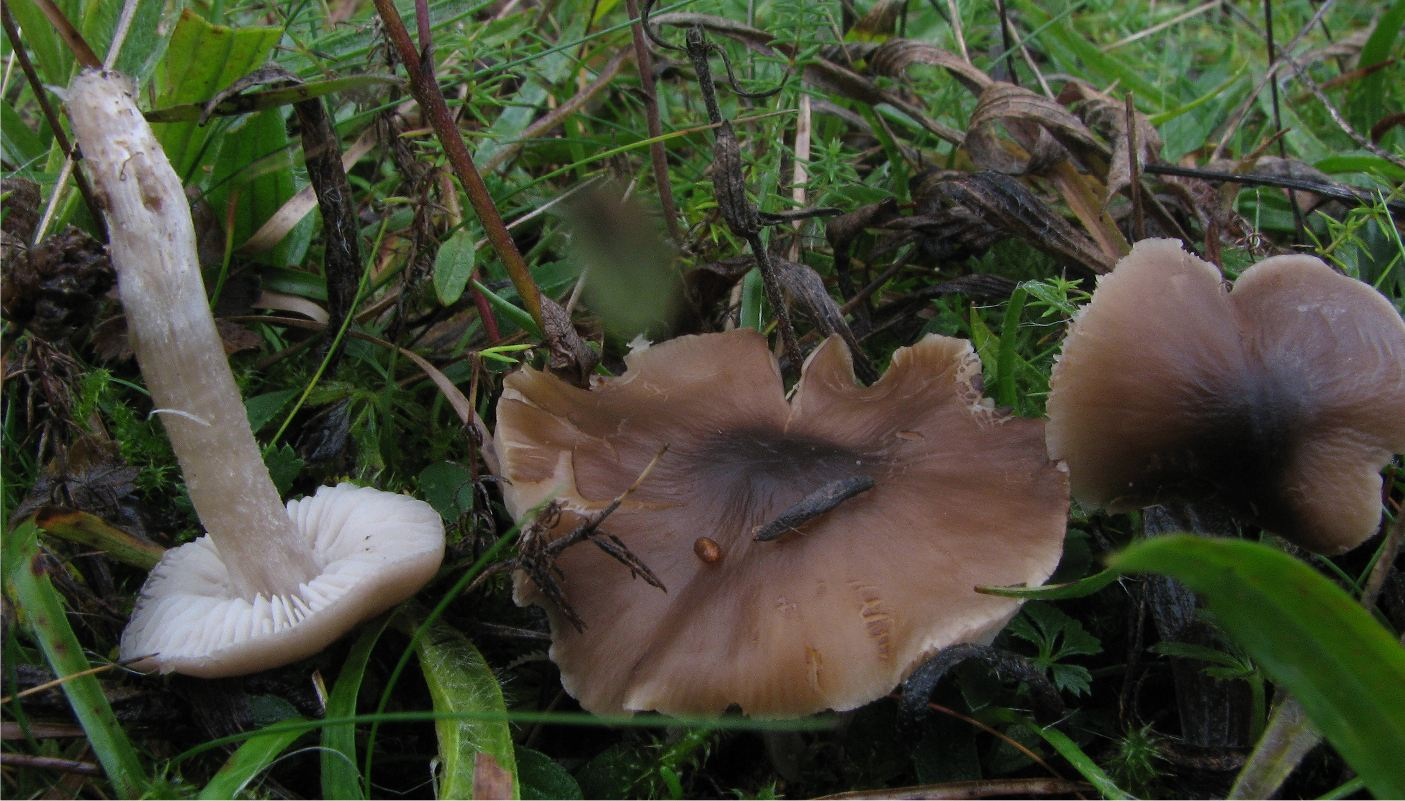
- Dermoloma cuneifolium

Scientific classification
- Kingdom: Fungi
- Division: Basidiomycota
- Class: Agaricomycetes
- Order: Agaricales
- Family: Tricholomataceae
- Genus: Dermoloma; J.E.Lange ex Herink (1959)

Type species
- Dermoloma cuneifolium (Fr.) Singer (1947)

= Dermoloma =

Genus of fungi

Dermoloma is a genus of fungi in the family Tricholomataceae. The widespread genus contains about 15 species.

== Species ==
- Dermoloma alexandri
- Dermoloma aposcenum
- Dermoloma atrobrunneum
- Dermoloma bellerianum
- Dermoloma coryleti
- Dermoloma cuneifolium
- Dermoloma cystidiatum
- Dermoloma emiliae-dlouhyi
- Dermoloma griseocameum
- Dermoloma hemisphaericum
- Dermoloma hybridum
- Dermoloma hygrophorus
- Dermoloma inconspicuum
- Dermoloma intermedium
- Dermoloma josserandii
- Dermoloma longibasidiatum
- Dermoloma magicum
- Dermoloma murinellum
- Dermoloma murinum
- Dermoloma pataguae
- Dermoloma pseudocuneifolium
- Dermoloma pusillum
- Dermoloma scotodes
- Dermoloma yungense
