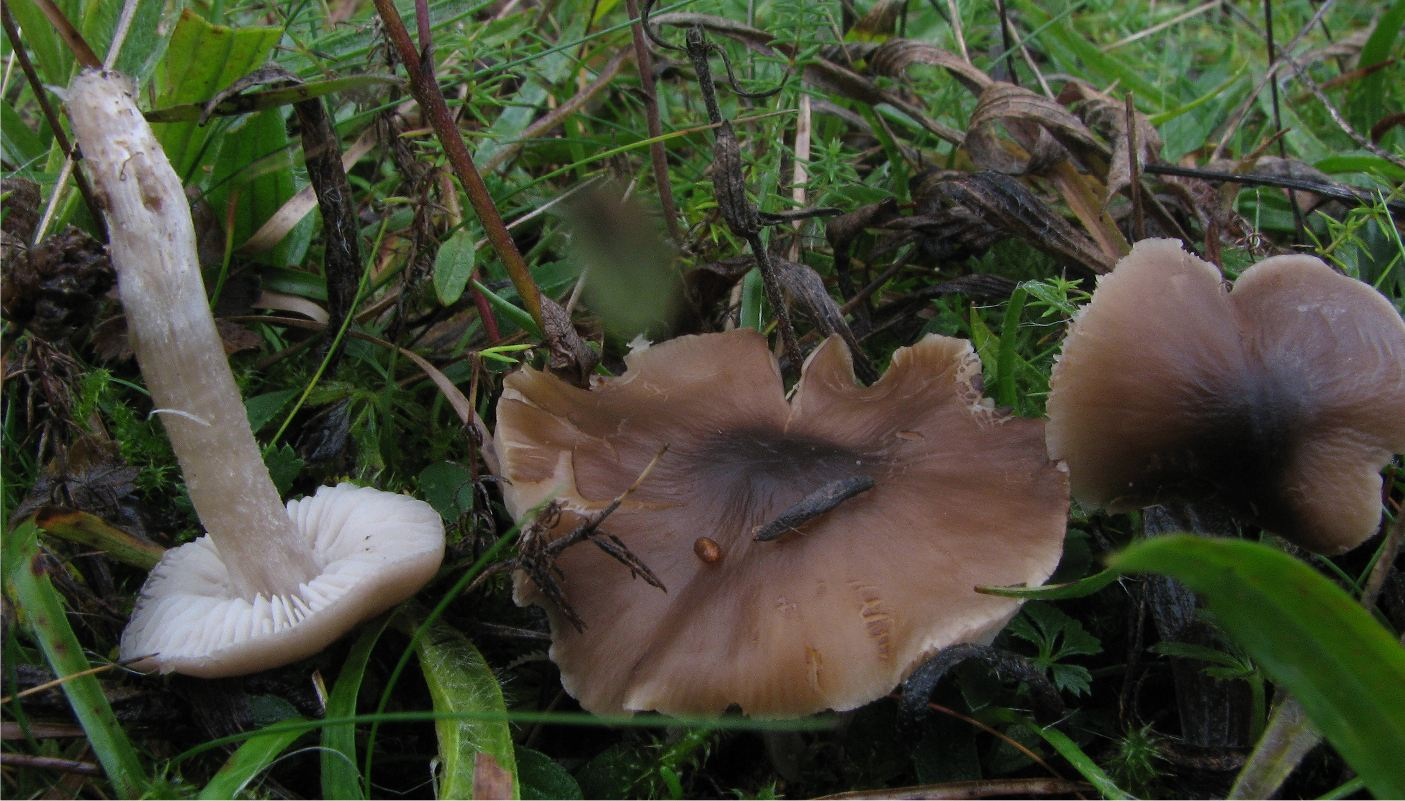
- Dermoloma cuneifolium

Scientific classification
- Kingdom: Fungi
- Division: Basidiomycota
- Class: Agaricomycetes
- Order: Agaricales
- Family: Tricholomataceae
- Genus: Dermoloma
- Species: D. cuneifolium

Binomial name
- Dermoloma cuneifolium (Fr.) Singer

Synonyms
- 1818 Agaricus cuneifolius Fr. 1886 Gyrophila cuneifolia (Fr.) Quél. 1871 Tricholoma cuneifolium (Fr.) P.Kumm. 1947 Dermoloma cuneifolium (Fr.) Singer; 1886 Gyrophila atrocinerea (Pers.) Quél. 1872 Tricholoma atrocinereum (Pers.) Quél. 1958 Dermoloma atrocinereum (Pers.) Herink; 1960 Dermoloma atrocinereum (Pers.) P.D.Orton; 1801 Agaricus atrocinereus Pers. 1980 Dermoloma fuscobrunneum P.D.Orton

= Dermoloma cuneifolium =

Species of fungus

Dermoloma cuneifolium is a species of fungus in the family Tricholomataceae, and the type species of the genus Dermoloma. Originally named Agaricus cuneifolius by Elias Magnus Fries in 1818, it was transferred to Dermoloma by Marcel Bon in 1986.
