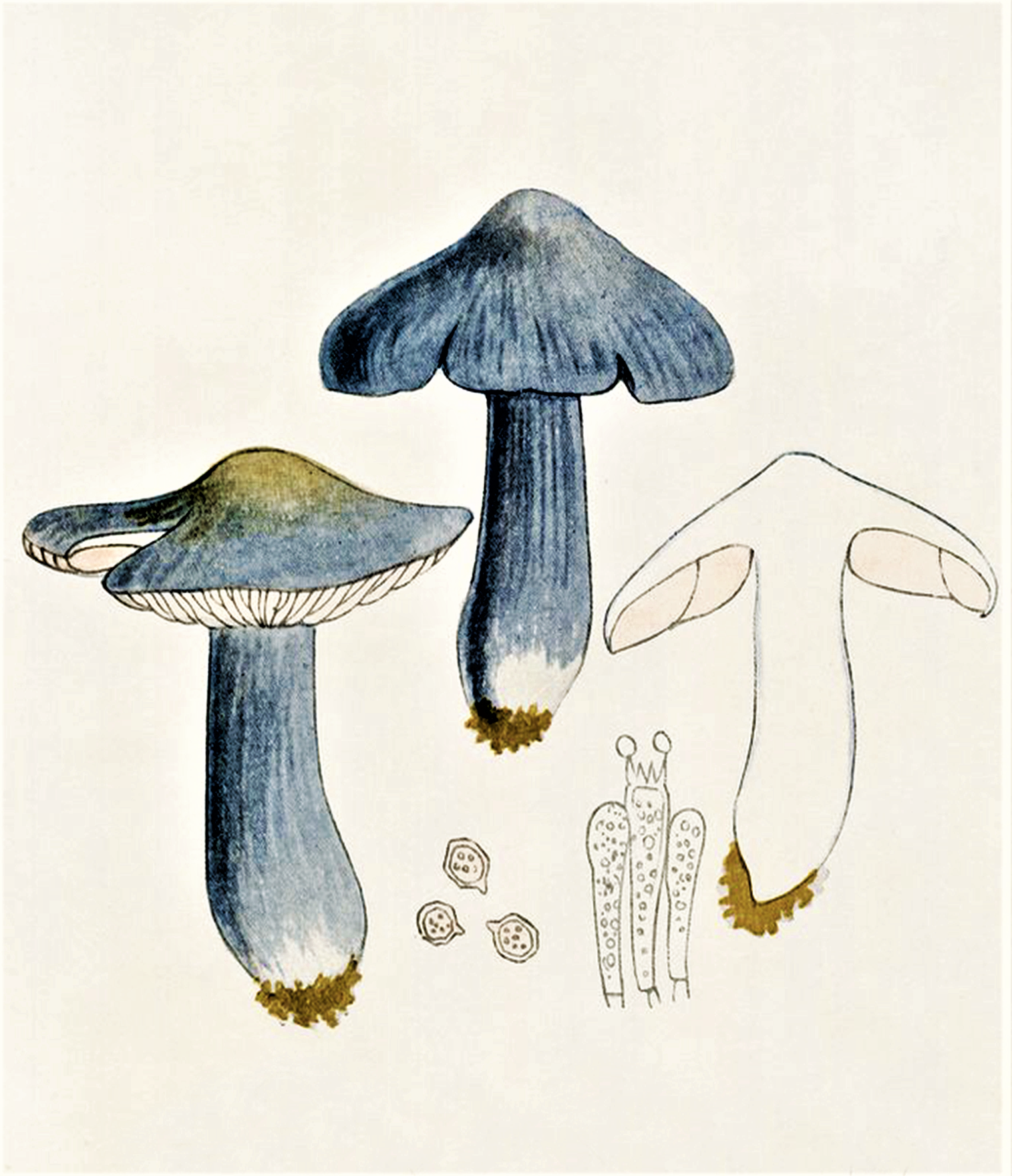
- Entoloma bloxamii illustrated by Giacomo Bresadola

Conservation status
- Vulnerable (IUCN 3.1)

Scientific classification
- Kingdom: Fungi
- Division: Basidiomycota
- Class: Agaricomycetes
- Order: Agaricales
- Family: Entolomataceae
- Genus: Entoloma
- Species: E. bloxamii

Binomial name
- Entoloma bloxamii (Berk. & Broome) Sacc.

Synonyms
- Agaricus bloxamii Berk. & Broome; Entoloma bloxamii var. triste Boud.; Entoloma madidum var. bloxamii (Berk. & Broome) Largent; Rhodophyllus bloxamii (Berk. & Broome) Romagn.

= Entoloma bloxamii =

Species of fungus

Entoloma bloxamii
- Mycological characteristics
- Gills on hymenium
- Cap is convex
- Hymenium is adnexed
- Stipe is bare
- Spore print is pink
- Ecology is saprotrophic
- Edibility is not recommended

Entoloma bloxamii, commonly known as the big blue pinkgill, is a species of agaric (gilled mushroom) in the family Entolomataceae.

The species has a European distribution, occurring mainly in agriculturally unimproved grassland. It has been reported from North America, but at least some of these reports represent a distinct species, E. medianox. Threats to the habitat of E. bloxamii have resulted in it being assessed as globally "vulnerable" on the IUCN Red List of Threatened Species.

== Taxonomy ==
The species was originally described from England in 1854 and named Agaricus Bloxami (sic) by Miles Joseph Berkeley and Christopher Edmund Broome, in honour of its collector, the naturalist and clergyman Andrew Bloxam. It was transferred to the genus Entoloma by the Italian mycologist Pier Andrea Saccardo in 1887.

Recent molecular research, based on cladistic analysis of DNA sequences, has shown that Entoloma bloxamii sensu lato comprises a number of distinct blue taxa in Europe, including Entoloma bloxamii sensu stricto, Entoloma madidum (previously considered a synonym), E. atromadidum, E. ochreoprunuloides f. hyacinthinum, and an additional as yet unnamed species. Collections from the west coast of North America, formerly referred to E. bloxamii or E. madidum, are also distinct and are now referred to Entoloma medianox.

== Description ==
The basidiocarps are agaricoid, up to 4.5 cm (1.75 in) tall, the cap conical becoming convex to conical, up to 5 cm (2 in) across. The cap surface is smooth, pale greyish blue at first becoming greyish brown. The lamellae (gills) are white becoming pink from the spores. The stipe (stem) is smooth, finely fibrillose, white with greyish blue streaks, often yellowish at the base, lacking a ring. The spore print is pink, the spores (under a microscope) multi-angled, inamyloid, measuring about 7.5 to 9.5 by 7 to 9.5 μm.

=== Similar species ===
Entoloma madidum (the midnight blue entoloma) is a deeper, slightly violet blue and retains some of its colour when old. It also has smaller spores (6 to 7.5 μm). E. atromadidum is similar but a darker, indigo blue and E. ochreoprunuloides f. hyacinthinum is dark brown with violaceous tints.

== Distribution and habitat ==
The species is rare but widespread in Europe. Like many other European pinkgills, it occurs in old, agriculturally unimproved, short-sward grassland (pastures and lawns). It is usually associated with calcareous soils although it may also be found in more acidic areas.

== Conservation ==
Entoloma bloxamii is typical of waxcap grasslands, a declining habitat due to changing agricultural practices. As a result, the species is of global conservation concern and is listed as "vulnerable" on the IUCN Red List of Threatened Species.

== See also ==
- List of Entoloma species
