= Josef Herink =

Czech mycologist (1915–1999)

- Born: 26 December 1915; Prague, Bohemia, Austria-Hungary
- Died: 20 August 1999 (aged 83); Prague, Czech Republic
- Resting place: Old Cemetery in Mladá Boleslav
- Education: Charles University
- Scientific career
- Fields: Mycologist
- Author abbrev. (botany): Herink

Josef Herink (26 December 1915 – 20 August 1999) was a Czech medical doctor and mycologist.

== Life and career ==
Josef Herink was born in Prague on 26 December 1915. He completed his medical studies at Charles University in Prague before practicing as a specialist in internal medicine in Turnov and Mnichovo Hradiště, in northern Bohemia. Very active in mycology, he was one of the initiators, in 1945, of the Czechoslovak Mycological Club, founded the following year, and renamed since 1993 the Czech Scientific Society for Mycology. From 1947 to his last months he was actively involved in the scientific journal called Czech Mycology (formerly Česká mykologie), of which he is one of the founders. He wrote numerous biographical notes on Czech mycologists. Most of his mycological and biographical contributions are published in the Czech language.

He devoted much of his career as a mycologist to the study of his favourite genus, Lepiota, but he also worked on the genera Agaricus, Armillaria, Cortinarius, Entoloma, Mycena, Omphalina, and on the species Helvella gabretae, Xerocomus moravicus, among others. He attached great importance to the use of chemical reagents for the delimitation and identification of species of agarics and boletes. He always had his reagents with him and used them systematically for his descriptions. He even developed specific chemical tests on the milk cap mushrooms. He tried to define macroscopic characters to allow the identification of agarics and boletes without resorting to microscopy. His great experience allowed him to recognize many species in the field, or during exhibitions and conferences. All his life he collected data on the distribution of macromycetes in Czechoslovakia. His herbarium samples, preserved in the Mycology Department of the National Museum in Prague, are accompanied by meticulous descriptions of the characters observed in the fresh state (color, smell, taste, consistency, etc.).

Herink was also interested in nature conservation, studying the mycological flora of several nature reserves. He was co-author of the red book of the cryptogamic flora of Slovakia and the Czech Republic published in 1995, where he listed twenty species of agarics and boletes, illustrated by his younger brother, the painter Jan Herink. He presented numerous lectures to the mycological society, not only on agarics and boletes, but also on poisonous mushrooms and on nature conservation, the last, three months before his death, on the genus Clitocybe.

Josef Herink combined his training as a doctor and his passion for fungi by studying mushroom poisonings, their toxicity and their treatment, to which he devoted his best-known work Poisonings by Fungi (1958), which was illustrated by his brother.

== Eponyms ==
Several fungus species have been named after Herink. These include: Sepultaria herinkii Svrček (1948); Coprinus herinkii Pilát & Svrček (1967); Agaricus herinkii Wasser (1996); Ceriporia herinkii Vampola (1996); Conocybe herinkii Svrček (1996); and Gymnopus herinkii Antonín & Noordel. (1996).

== See also ==
- Category:Taxa named by Josef Herink
- List of mycologists
