= Witch's hat =

Witch's Hat may refer to

- Witch hat, in popular culture
- Pointed hat, in general
- Hygrocybe conica, a fungus commonly known as the "witch's hat"
- Hygrocybe singeri, a fungus commonly known as the "witch's hat"
- Prospect Park Water Tower, sometimes referred to as the "Witch's Hat"
- Traffic cone, known as a "witch's hat" in some countries

== See also ==
- Witch Hats, a rock band
