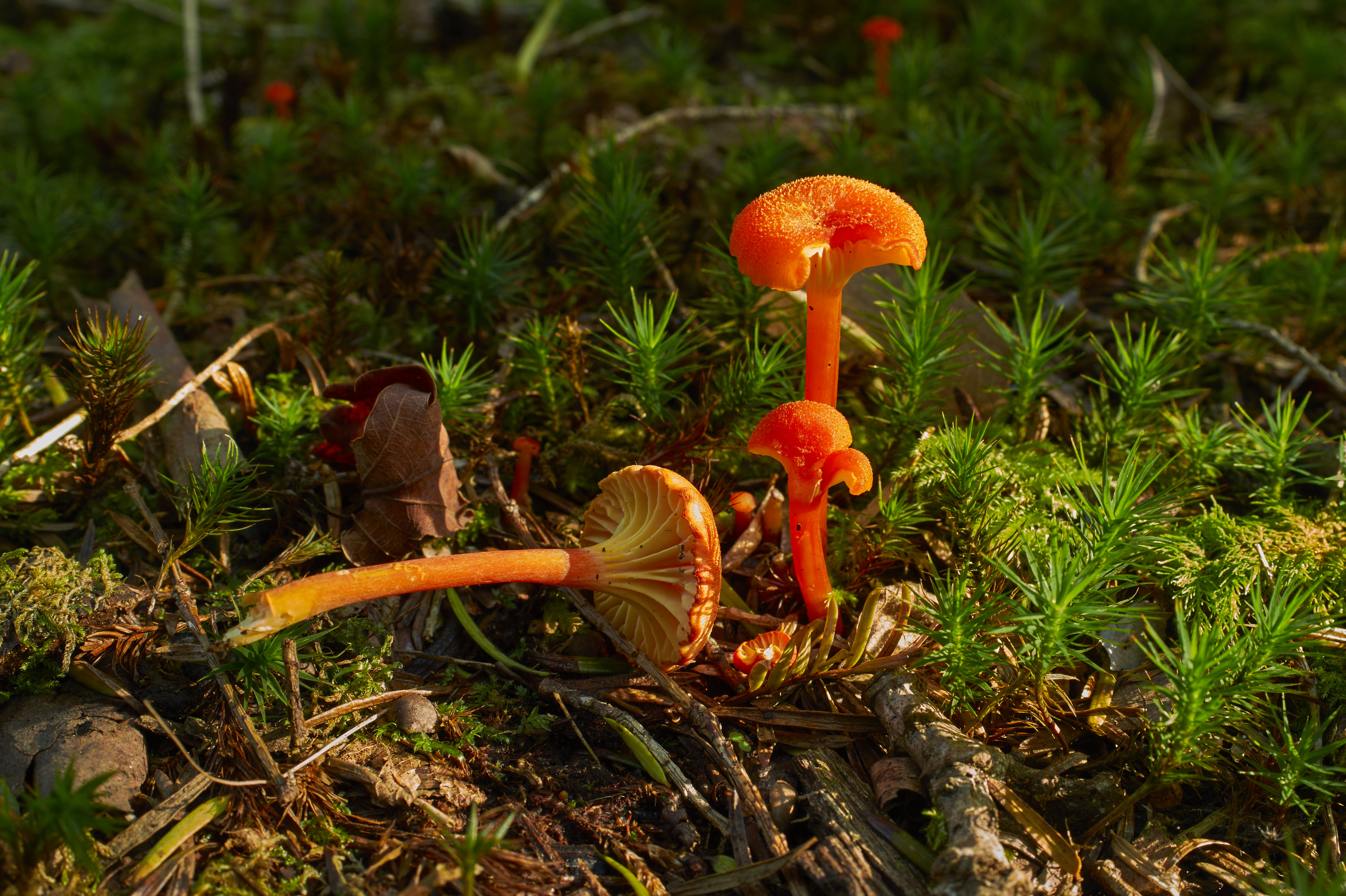

Scientific classification
- Kingdom: Fungi
- Division: Basidiomycota
- Class: Agaricomycetes
- Order: Agaricales
- Family: Hygrophoraceae
- Genus: Hygrocybe
- Species: H. lepida

Binomial name
- Hygrocybe lepida Arnolds (1986)

= Hygrocybe lepida =

Species of fungus

Hygrocybe lepida is an agaric (gilled mushroom) in the family Hygrophoraceae. The species occurs in Europe and was previously referred to the American Hygrocybe cantharellus but is now known to be distinct. Its recommended English name (as H. cantharellus) is goblet waxcap. The species is typically found in nutrient-poor waxcap grassland.

== Taxonomy ==
It was first described in 1986 by the Dutch mycologist Eef Arnolds who classified it as Hygrocybe lepida.
