= Witches' hat =

Witch hat, Witches hat, or Witches' hat may refer to:

- Anti-trespass panels, rubber mats with cones or pyramids used by railroads to prevent people from walking on or near tracks
- A hat belonging to a witch (witch hat)
- A turret with a conical roof (see also, witch tower)
- A traffic cone
- A cone shaped playground roundabout that is mounted in such a way that the axis of rotation is free to tilt
- Hygrocybe conica, a small mushroom in the genus Hygrocybe
- "Witches Hat", a song on the Incredible String Band album The Hangman's Beautiful Daughter
