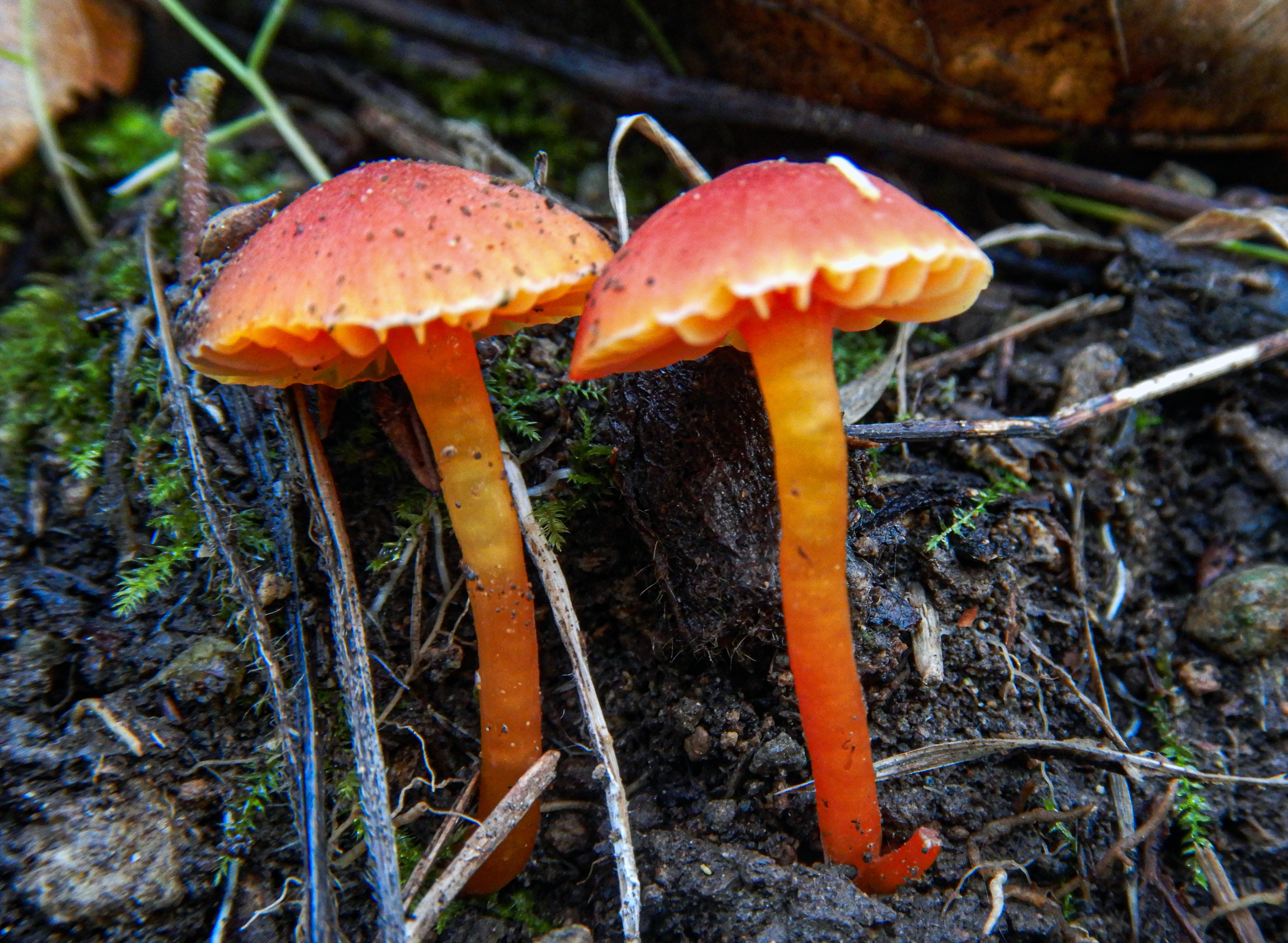

Conservation status
- Vulnerable (IUCN 3.1)

Scientific classification
- Kingdom: Fungi
- Division: Basidiomycota
- Class: Agaricomycetes
- Order: Agaricales
- Family: Hygrophoraceae
- Genus: Hygrocybe
- Species: H. mucronella

Binomial name
- Hygrocybe mucronella (Fr.) P. Karst. (1879)

Synonyms
- Hygrophorus mucronellus Fr. (1838)

= Hygrocybe mucronella =

Species of fungus

Hygrocybe mucronella is a species of agaric (gilled mushroom) in the family Hygrophoraceae. It has been given the recommended English name of bitter waxcap. The species has a European distribution and typically occurs in grassland where it produces basidiocarps (fruit bodies) in the autumn. Threats to its habitat have resulted in the species being assessed as globally "vulnerable" on the IUCN Red List of Threatened Species.

== Taxonomy ==
The species was first described in 1879 by the Swedish mycologist Elias Magnus Fries as Hygrophorus mucronellus and was later moved to the genus Hygrocybe.

Recent molecular research, based on cladistic analysis of DNA sequences, suggests that Hygrocybe mucronella belongs within the concept of Hygrocybe sensu stricto.

== Description ==
The basidiocarps are agaricoid, up to 4 cm (2 in) tall, the cap hemispherical to shallowly convex, up to 3.5 cm (1.5 in) across. The cap surface is smooth, slightly greasy when young, becoming dry and matt, bright scarlet to orange-red often with a yellow margin, striate often with a translucent central spot. The lamellae (gills) are waxy, orange, and broadly attached to the stipe. The stipe (stem) is smooth, cylindrical, viscid when young then dry, and cap-coloured or paler. The spore print is white, the spores (under a microscope) smooth, inamyloid, irregularly ellipsoid to oblong, often strongly constricted in the middle, about 7 to 8.5 by 4.5 to 6 μm. When placed on the tip of the tongue, fruitbodies have a bitter taste.

=== Similar species ===
Several other European waxcaps are of similar size and colour. Hygrocybe amara, recently described from Slovakia based on DNA sequencing, shares the bitter taste of H. mucronella and differs only in having a more consistently orange pileus and slightly shorter spores. Hygrocybe alpina, also described from Slovakia based on DNA sequencing and known from Sweden, is equally bitter, but has a montane distribution, a scarlet to carmine pileus, and longer spores. The widespread Hygrocybe insipida is of similar size and colour, but has slightly decurrent lamellae and lacks the bitter taste.

== Distribution and habitat ==
The bitter waxcap is widespread throughout Europe, where it typically grows in old, unimproved, short-sward grassland (pastures and lawns). Recent research suggests waxcaps are neither mycorrhizal nor saprotrophic but may be associated with mosses.

== Conservation ==
Hygrocybe mucronella is typical of waxcap grasslands, a declining habitat due to changing agricultural practices. As a result, the species is of global conservation concern and is listed as "vulnerable" on the IUCN Red List of Threatened Species.

== See also ==
- List of Hygrocybe species
