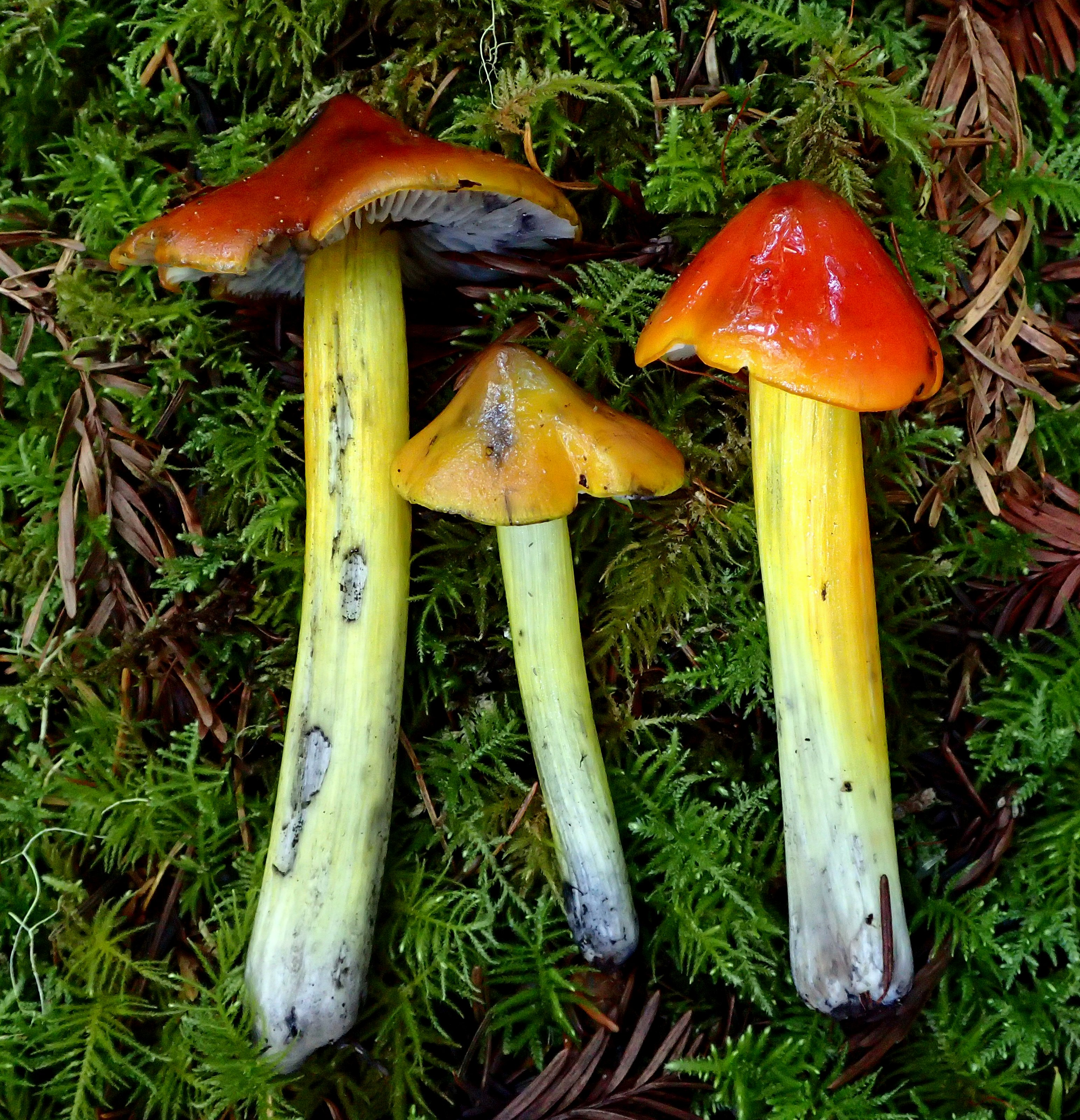

Scientific classification
- Kingdom: Fungi
- Division: Basidiomycota
- Class: Agaricomycetes
- Order: Agaricales
- Family: Hygrophoraceae
- Genus: Hygrocybe
- Species: H. singeri

Binomial name
- Hygrocybe singeri (Smith & Hesler) Singer

Synonyms
- Hygrophorus singeri Smith & Hesler

= Hygrocybe singeri =

Species of fungus

Hygrocybe singeri
- Mycological characteristics
- Gills on hymenium
- Cap is conical
- Hymenium is adnexed
- Stipe is bare
- Spore print is white
- Edibility is not recommended

Hygrocybe singeri, the western witch's hat, is a species of Hygrocybe from Northwestern California and the Pacific Northwest. The species is very similar to Hygrocybe conica, differing in its viscid stipe.

== Description ==
The cap of Hygrocybe singeri is orange in color and conical in shape. It is about 3-10 centimeters in diameter, and has a slimy surface when wet. The stipe is about 4-14 centimeters long and 0.5-1 centimeters wide. It is yellow in color and has a slimy surface. The base is whitish. The gills are whitish and become grayish to black as the mushroom matures. They are adnexed. The fruitbody turns black when bruised and in age. The spore print is white.

=== Similar species ===
Hygrocybe conica is very similar to H. singeri, but does not have a slimy cap when wet. In dry weather, these species can be very difficult to distinguish. H. oliveoniger is similar as well, but has a yellowish to greenish cap, while H. acutoconica is similar to H. singeri but does not bruise black. A white form of H. singeri exists, H. singeri "alba", which can be confused with H. albinellus. H. nigrescens is similar but grows under oaks. It is also redder in color and larger in size. H. singeri and H. conica are both thought to be species complexes, with H. singeri consisting of at least five cryptic species in the Pacific Northwest.

== Habitat and ecology ==
Hygrocybe singeri is found in a wide variety of habitats, with different species in the group often preferring different habitats. The most common species in the Pacific Northwest grows in mixed forests. The ecological role of the H. singeri is unknown.

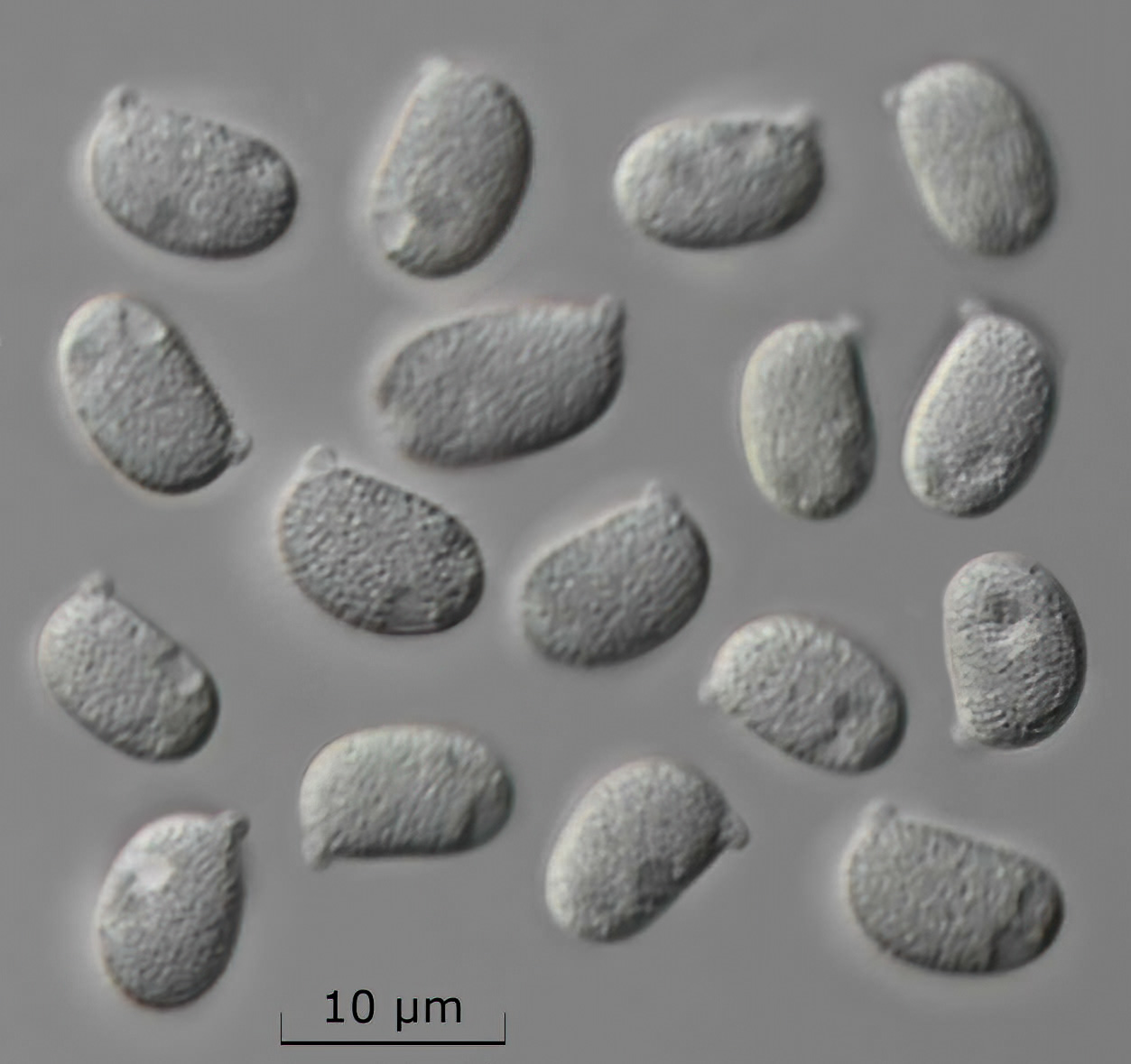
Hygrocybe singeri spores 1000x
