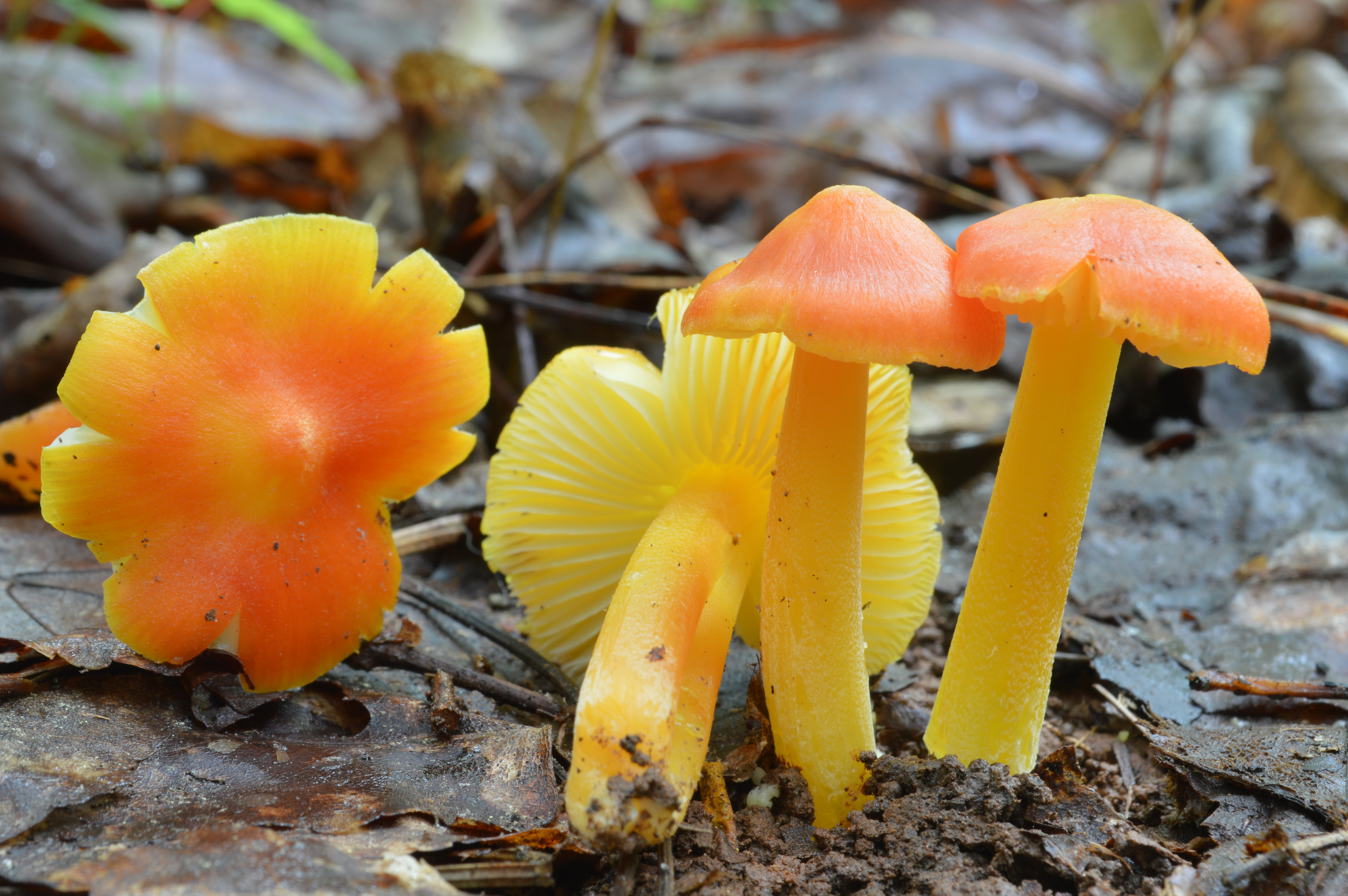

Scientific classification
- Kingdom: Fungi
- Division: Basidiomycota
- Class: Agaricomycetes
- Order: Agaricales
- Family: Hygrophoraceae
- Genus: Hygrocybe
- Species: H. flavescens

Binomial name
- Hygrocybe flavescens (Kauff.) Singer

Synonyms
- Hygrocybe chlorophana var. aurantiaca Bon

= Hygrocybe flavescens =

Species of fungus

Hygrocybe flavescens Mycological characteristics
- Gills on hymenium
- Cap is conical
- Hymenium is adnexed
- Stipe is bare
- Spore print is white
- Ecology is mycorrhizal
- Edibility is edible

Hygrocybe flavescens, commonly known as the golden waxy cap, is a species of Hygrocybe described from Michigan.

== Description ==
The mushroom is yellow-orange. Its cap is 2.5 to 7 centimetres (1 to 2 3/4 in) wide and can be more orange in youth. The stalk is 4 to 9 cm (1 1/2 to 3 1/2 in) long and 0.5 to 1.5 cm wide. The gills are more pale than the cap and stipe. The flesh is yellowish and has a mild taste and odor. The spores are white, elliptical, smooth and inamyloid. The spore print is white.

=== Similar species ===
Hygrocybe chlorophana is similar, noted in North America as having a more viscid stipe. This distinction is not made in Europe, indicating that they may be the same species.

Outside of several similar Hygrocybe species, members of the uncommon Gloioxanthomyces can be recognized by their decurrent gills.

== Distribution and habitat ==
The species has been described from Michigan. It can be found in various forests and woodlands.

== Uses ==
The species is considered nonpoisonous to humans. It can serve as food, but is of low interest.
