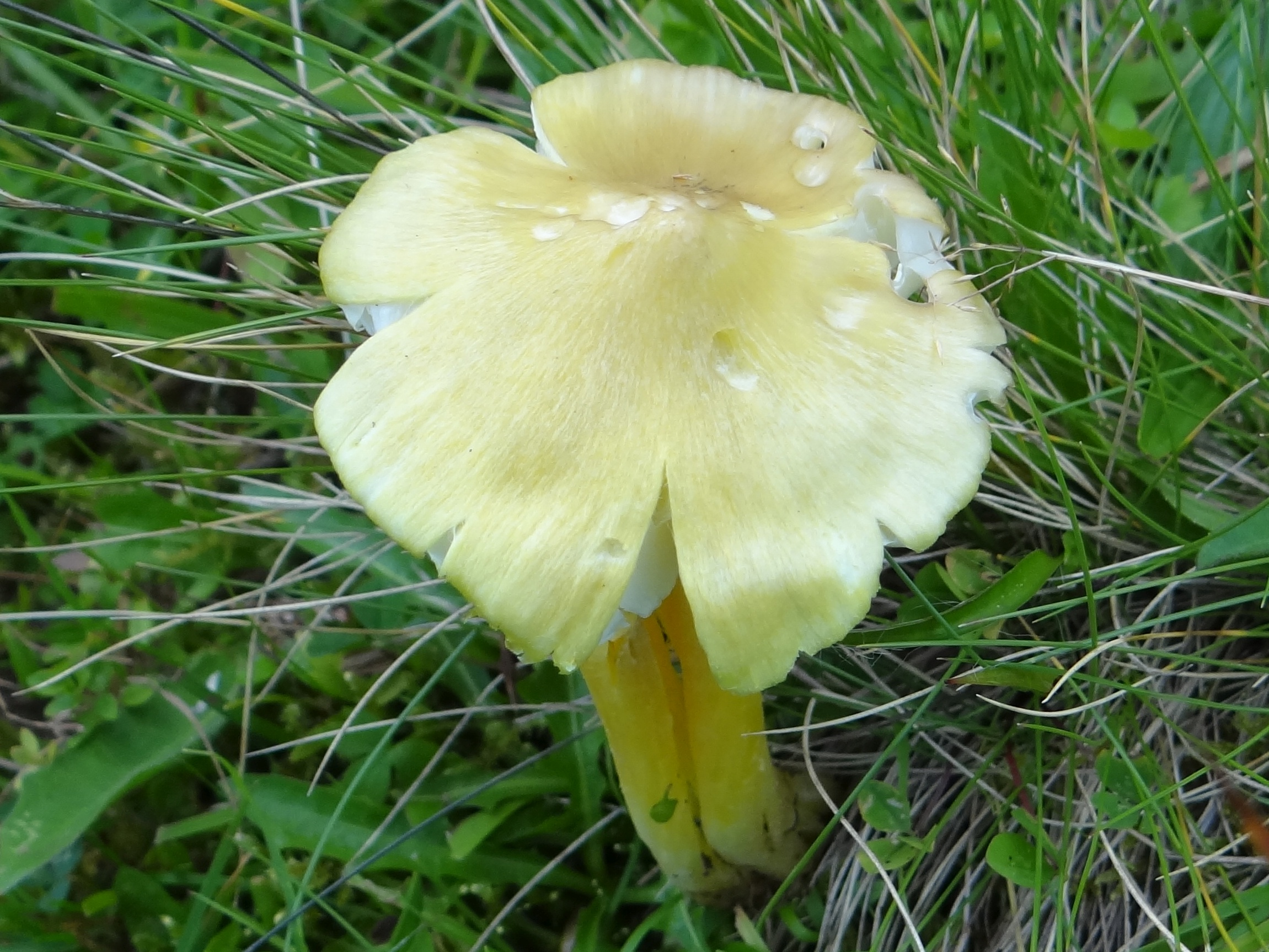

Conservation status
- Vulnerable (IUCN 3.1)

Scientific classification
- Kingdom: Fungi
- Division: Basidiomycota
- Class: Agaricomycetes
- Order: Agaricales
- Family: Hygrophoraceae
- Genus: Hygrocybe
- Species: H. citrinovirens

Binomial name
- Hygrocybe citrinovirens (J.E.Lange) Jul.Schäff. (1947)

Synonyms
- Camarophyllus citrinovirens J.E.Lange (1923); Godfrinia citrinovirens (J.E.Lange) Herink (1958); Hygrocybe brevispora F. H. Møller (1945); Godfrinia brevispora (F. H. Møller) Herink (1958); Hygrophorus brevisporus (F. H. Møller) P. D. Orton (1960)

= Hygrocybe citrinovirens =

Citrine waxcap

Species of fungus

Hygrocybe citrinovirens is a species of agaric (gilled mushroom) in the family Hygrophoraceae. It has been given the recommended English name of Citrine Waxcap. The species has a European distribution, occurring mainly in agriculturally unimproved grassland. Threats to its habitat have resulted in the species being assessed as globally "vulnerable" on the IUCN Red List of Threatened Species.

== Taxonomy ==
The species was first described from Denmark in 1923 by mycologist Jakob Emanuel Lange as Camarophyllus citrinovirens. Julius Schäffer transferred it to the genus Hygrocybe in 1947.

Recent molecular research, based on cladistic analysis of DNA sequences, has shown that Hygrocybe citrinovirens is distinct and belongs in Hygrocybe sensu stricto.

== Description ==
Basidiocarps are agaricoid, up to 130mm (5 in) tall, the cap conical at first, retaining an acute or distinct umbo when expanded, up to 90mm (3 in) across, often splitting at the margins. The cap surface is smooth, dry, and radially fibrillose, greenish yellow to lemon-yellow. The lamellae (gills) are waxy, white to pale cap-coloured. The stipe (stem) is smooth, often compressed and grooved or splitting, pale cap-coloured, lacking a ring. The spore print is white, the spores (under a microscope) smooth, inamyloid, ellipsoid, c. 6.5 to 8.5 by 5 to 6μm.

== Distribution and habitat ==
The Citrine Waxcap is widespread but generally rare throughout Europe, with the largest populations in the north west of the continent. Like other waxcaps, it occurs in old, agriculturally unimproved, short-sward grassland (pastures and lawns). In North America, the rare Hygrocybe virescens is similar to H. citrinovirens, but more distinctly green.

Recent research suggests waxcaps are neither mycorrhizal nor saprotrophic but may be associated with mosses.

== Conservation ==
Hygrocybe citrinovirens is typical of waxcap grasslands, a declining habitat due to changing agricultural practices. As a result, the species is of global conservation concern and is listed as "vulnerable" on the IUCN Red List of Threatened Species. Hygrocybe citrinovirens also appears on the official or provisional national red lists of threatened fungi in several European countries, including Croatia, Denmark, Finland, Germany, Norway, and Sweden.

== See also ==
- List of Hygrocybe species
- List of fungi by conservation status
