= Hygrocybe subpapillata =

Conservation status
- Vulnerable (IUCN 3.1)

Scientific classification
- Kingdom: Fungi
- Division: Basidiomycota
- Class: Agaricomycetes
- Order: Agaricales
- Family: Hygrophoraceae
- Genus: Hygrocybe
- Species: H. subpapillata

Binomial name
- Hygrocybe subpapillata Kühner (1979)

Species of fungus

Hygrocybe subpapillata is a species of agaric (gilled mushroom) in the family Hygrophoraceae. It has been given the recommended English name of papillate waxcap. The species has a European distribution and typically occurs in grassland where it produces basidiocarps (fruit bodies) in the autumn. Threats to its habitat have resulted in the species being assessed as globally "vulnerable" on the IUCN Red List of Threatened Species.

== Taxonomy ==
The species was first described from France in 1979 by the French mycologist Robert Kühner.

Recent molecular research, based on cladistic analysis of DNA sequences, suggests that Hygrocybe subpapillata belongs within the concept of Hygrocybe sensu stricto.

== Description ==
The basidiocarps are agaricoid, up to 5 cm (2 in) tall, the cap hemispherical becoming flat with age, up to 3 cm (1.5 in) across. The cap surface is smooth, greasy, scarlet to orange, often with a raised, central spot (papilla). The lamellae (gills) are waxy, pale yellow to orange, and broadly attached to the stipe. The stipe (stem) is smooth, cylindrical, dry, and cap-coloured or paler. The spore print is white, the spores (under a microscope) smooth, inamyloid, ellipsoid to oblong, about 7 to 9 by 4.5 to 5.5 μm.

=== Similar species ===
Hygrocybe glutinipes is similar, but differs in having a viscid or glutinous stipe and viscid pileus lacking a papilla. Hygrocybe insipida typically has decurrent lamellae and a greasy stipe.

== Distribution and habitat ==
The papillate waxcap is widespread but rare throughout Europe, where it typically grows in old, unimproved, short-sward grassland (pastures and lawns). Recent research suggests waxcaps are neither mycorrhizal nor saprotrophic but may be associated with mosses.

== Conservation ==
Hygrocybe subpapillata is typical of waxcap grasslands, a declining habitat due to changing agricultural practices. As a result, the species is of global conservation concern and is listed as "vulnerable" on the IUCN Red List of Threatened Species.

== See also ==
- List of Hygrocybe species
