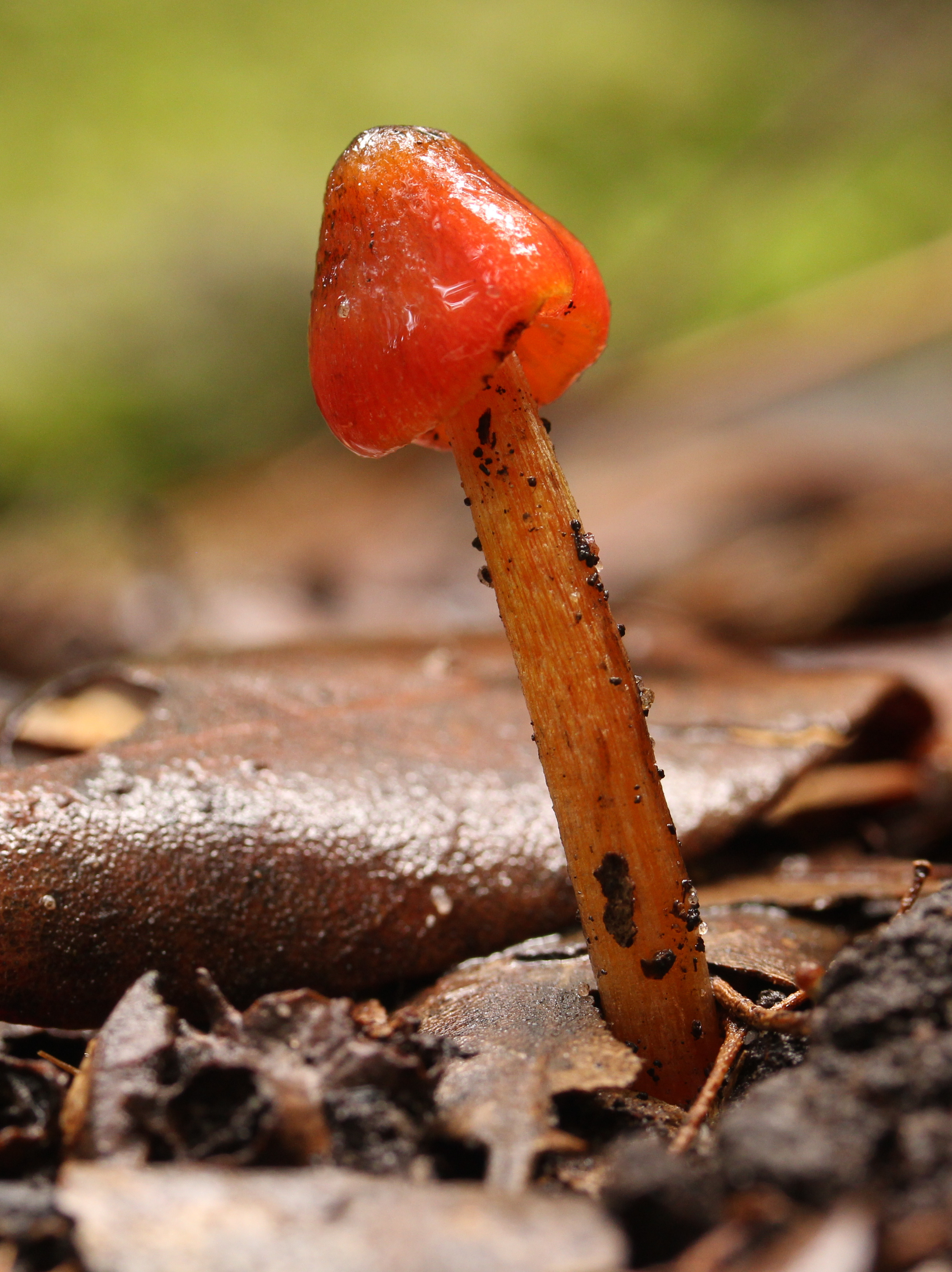
- Ferndale Park, Australia
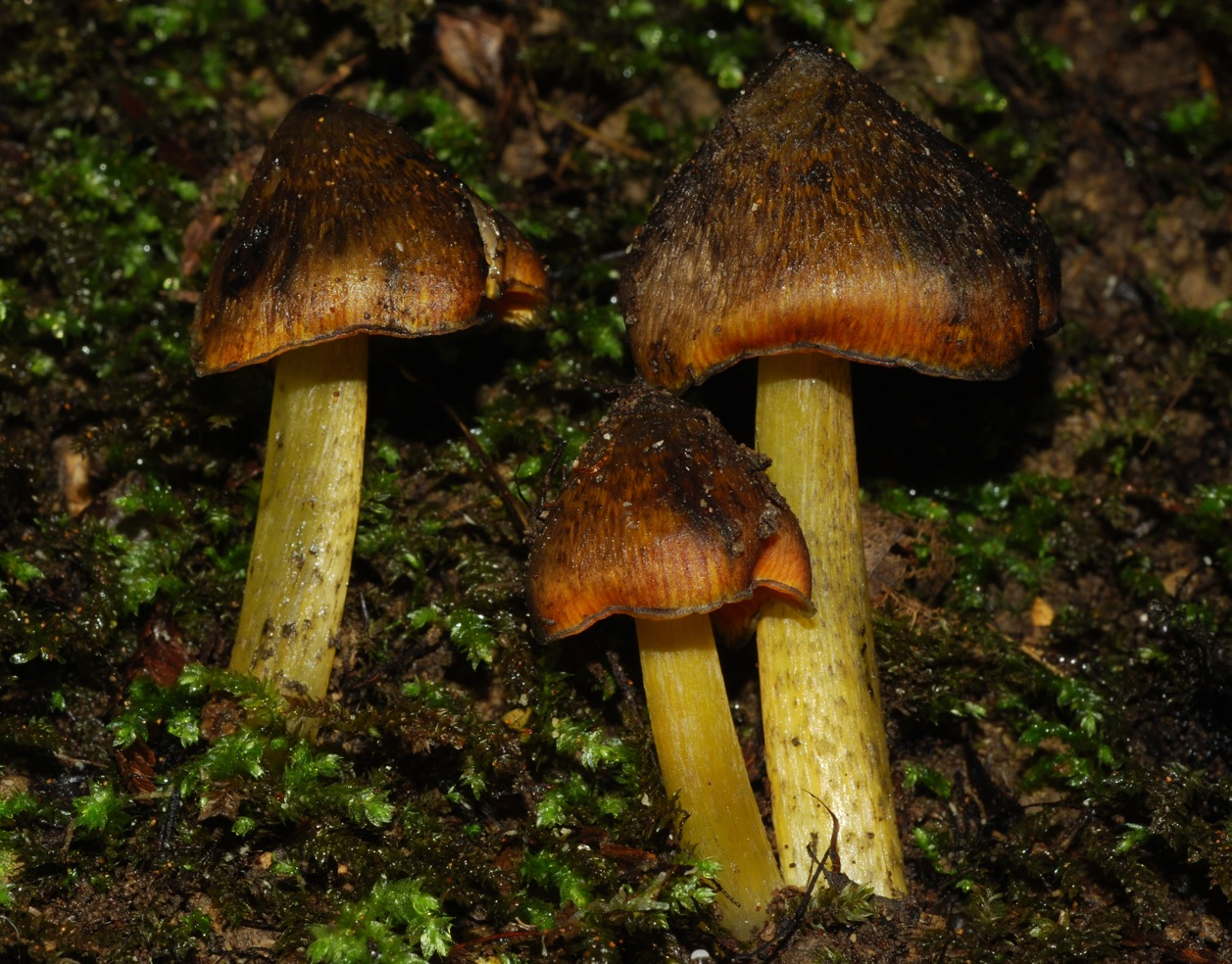

Scientific classification
- Domain: Eukaryota
- Kingdom: Fungi
- Division: Basidiomycota
- Class: Agaricomycetes
- Order: Agaricales
- Family: Hygrophoraceae
- Genus: Hygrocybe
- Species: H. astatogala

Binomial name
- Hygrocybe astatogala (R.Heim) Heinem. (1963)

Synonyms
- Bertrandia astatogala R.Heim (1936)

= Hygrocybe astatogala =

Species of fungus

Hygrocybe astatogala is a mushroom of the waxcap genus Hygrocybe. It is found in Madagascar (Type locality), Australia, Central Africa, the Philippines and New Zealand, it was first described scientifically as Bertrandia astatogala by French mycologist Roger Heim in 1936. Paul Heinemann transferred it to Hygrocybe in 1963.
