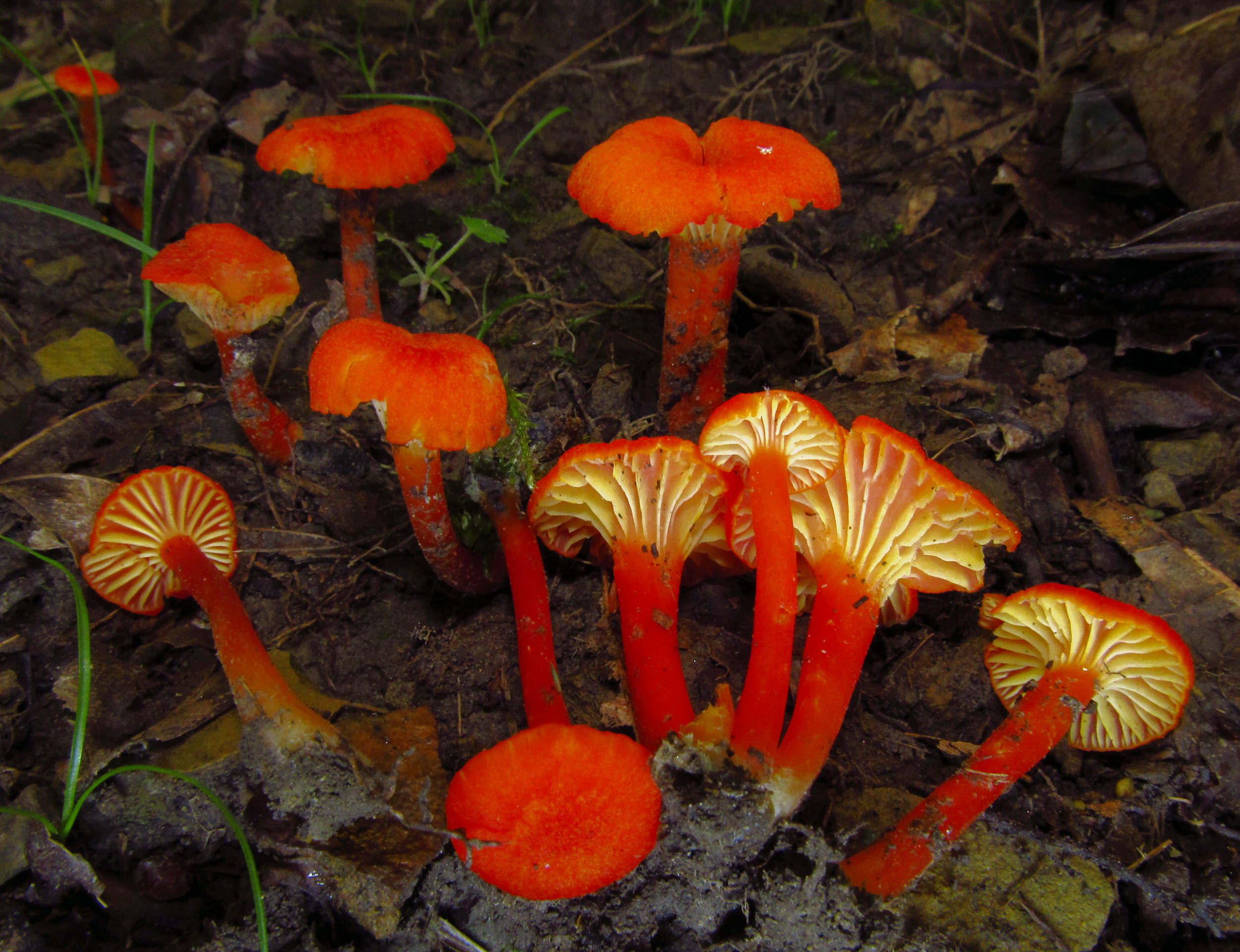

Scientific classification
- Kingdom: Fungi
- Division: Basidiomycota
- Class: Agaricomycetes
- Order: Agaricales
- Family: Hygrophoraceae
- Genus: Hygrocybe
- Species: H. cantharellus

Binomial name
- Hygrocybe cantharellus (Schwein.) Murrill (1911)

Synonyms
- Agaricus cantharellus Schwein. (1822); Craterellus cantharellus (Schwein.) Fr. (1838); Hygrophorus cantharellus (Schwein.) Fr. (1838); Trombetta cantharella (Schwein.) Kuntze (1891); Camarophyllus cantharellus (Schwein.) Murrill (1916); Pseudohygrocybe cantharella (Schwein.) Kovalenko (1988)

= Hygrocybe cantharellus =

Species of fungus

Hygrocybe cantharellus, commonly known as chanterelle waxy cap, is an agaric (gilled mushroom) in the family Hygrophoraceae. The European Hygrocybe lepida was previously referred to this name, but is now known to be distinct.

The orangish cap is up to 2.5 centimetres (1 in) wide and the reddish stem 8 cm (3 1/4 in) tall and 4 mm (3/16 in) thick. It can resemble members of its genus such as the uncommon H. coccineocrenata.

It is found in North America and Australia.
