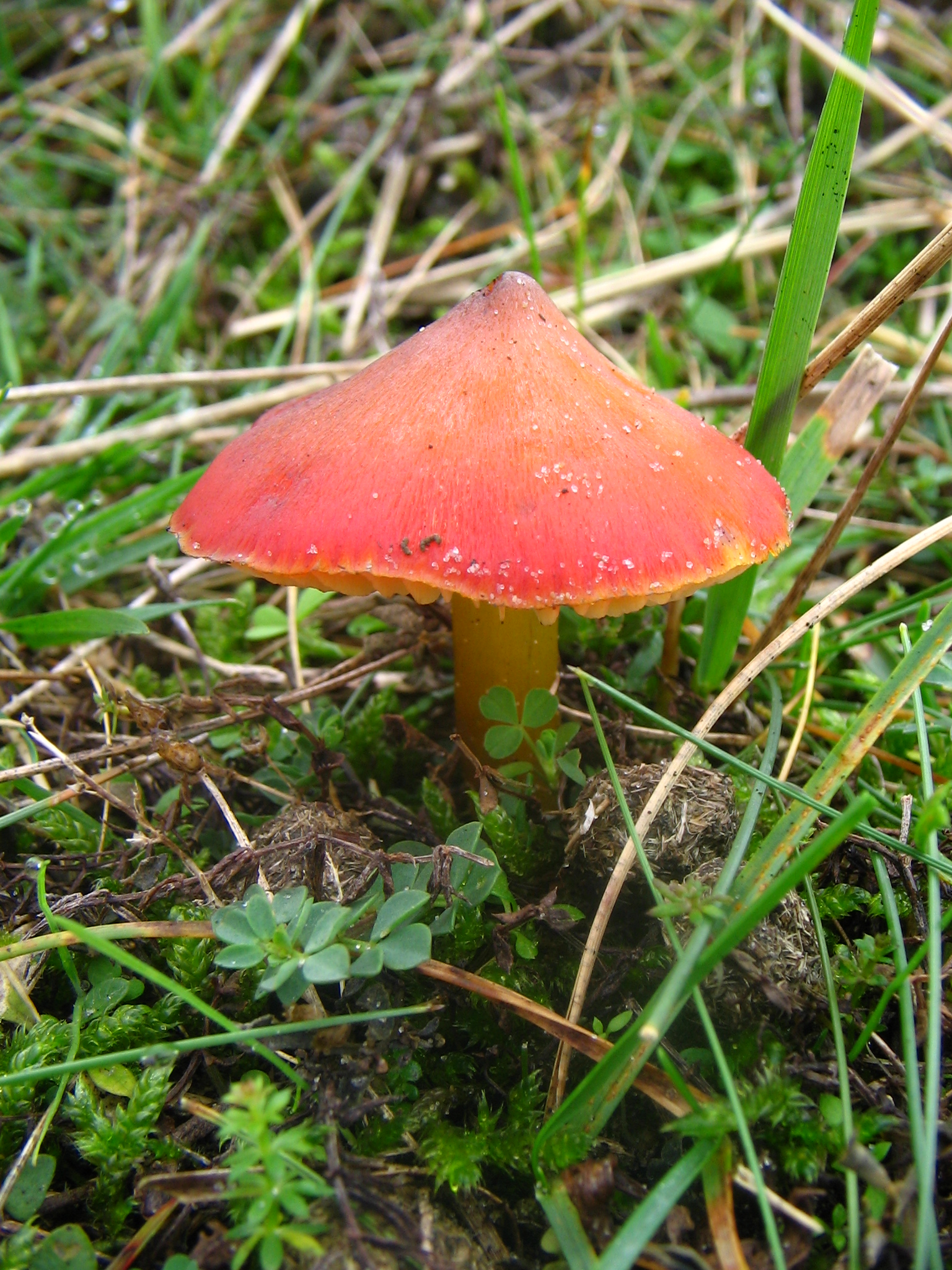
- Hygrocybe conica, Netherlands

Scientific classification
- Kingdom: Fungi
- Division: Basidiomycota
- Class: Agaricomycetes
- Order: Agaricales
- Family: Hygrophoraceae
- Genus: Hygrocybe
- Species: H. conica

Binomial name
- Hygrocybe conica (Schaeff.) P.Kumm. (1871)

Synonyms
- List: Agaricus conicus Schaeff. 1774; Agaricus tristis Pers. 1801; Godfrinia conica (Schaeff.) Maire 1902; Hygrocybe chloroides (Malençon) Kovalenko; Hygrophorus conicus (Schaeff.) Fr.; Hygrocybe conicopalustris R. Haller Aar

= Hygrocybe conica =

Species of fungus

Hygrocybe conica
- Mycological characteristics
- Gills on hymenium
- Cap is conical
- Hymenium is emarginate
- Stipe is bare
- Spore print is white
- Edibility is unknown

Hygrocybe conica is a species of agaric (gilled mushroom) in the family Hygrophoraceae. In the UK it has been given the recommended English name of blackening waxcap, since all parts of the basidiocarp (fruit body) blacken with age. In North America it is commonly known as the witch's hat, conical wax cap or conical slimy cap. Hygrocybe conica is known to be a complex of at least eleven closely related species and as such is widespread in Eurasia, North America, and elsewhere.

== Taxonomy ==
The species was first described from Bavaria in 1774 by German polymath Jacob Christian Schäffer, who named it Agaricus conicus. Paul Kummer transferred it to the genus Hygrocybe in 1871. Recent molecular research, based on cladistic analysis of DNA sequences, has confirmed that Hygrocybe conica belongs in Hygrocybe sensu stricto. However, it has also indicated that the name is currently applied to at least eleven closely related but genetically distinct taxa worldwide.

== Description ==
Basidiocarps are agaricoid, the cap narrowly conical at first becoming umbonate and often lobed, up to 10 centimetres (4 in) across. The cap surface is smooth and finely fibrillose, moist or viscid at first, variously yellow to orange or scarlet. The lamellae (gills) are waxy, white to pale yellow or greyish. The stipe (stem) is up to 20 cm (8 in) long, smooth but fibrillose and streaky, yellow to orange-red, whitish towards base, lacking a ring. All parts become duller and grey with age, finally becoming entirely black. The flesh is yellowish and stains black. The spore print is white, the spores (under a microscope) smooth, inamyloid, ellipsoid, measuring about 8.5 to 11.5 by 5 to 7.5 μm.

A number of other species in the genus may appear similar.

== Distribution and habitat ==
Hygrocybe conica is widely distributed across North America, Europe, and Asia, as well as Australia and New Zealand, being found in summer and autumn. In Europe, it is typical of waxcap grasslands, a declining habitat due to changing agricultural practices. It is one of the commonest waxcaps, however, and is also found in dunes, road verges, and other habitats. In North America it is often found in conifer woodland. Though H. conica occurs in Australia, principally near urban areas, many collections originally assigned to this species are the similar H. astatogala.

== Edibility ==
The edibility of H. conica is unknown and it may be poisonous. David Arora suggests that reported poisonings may have been caused by other species, but that H. conica may cause minor adverse effects (such as lightheadedness) and is unsubstantial.
