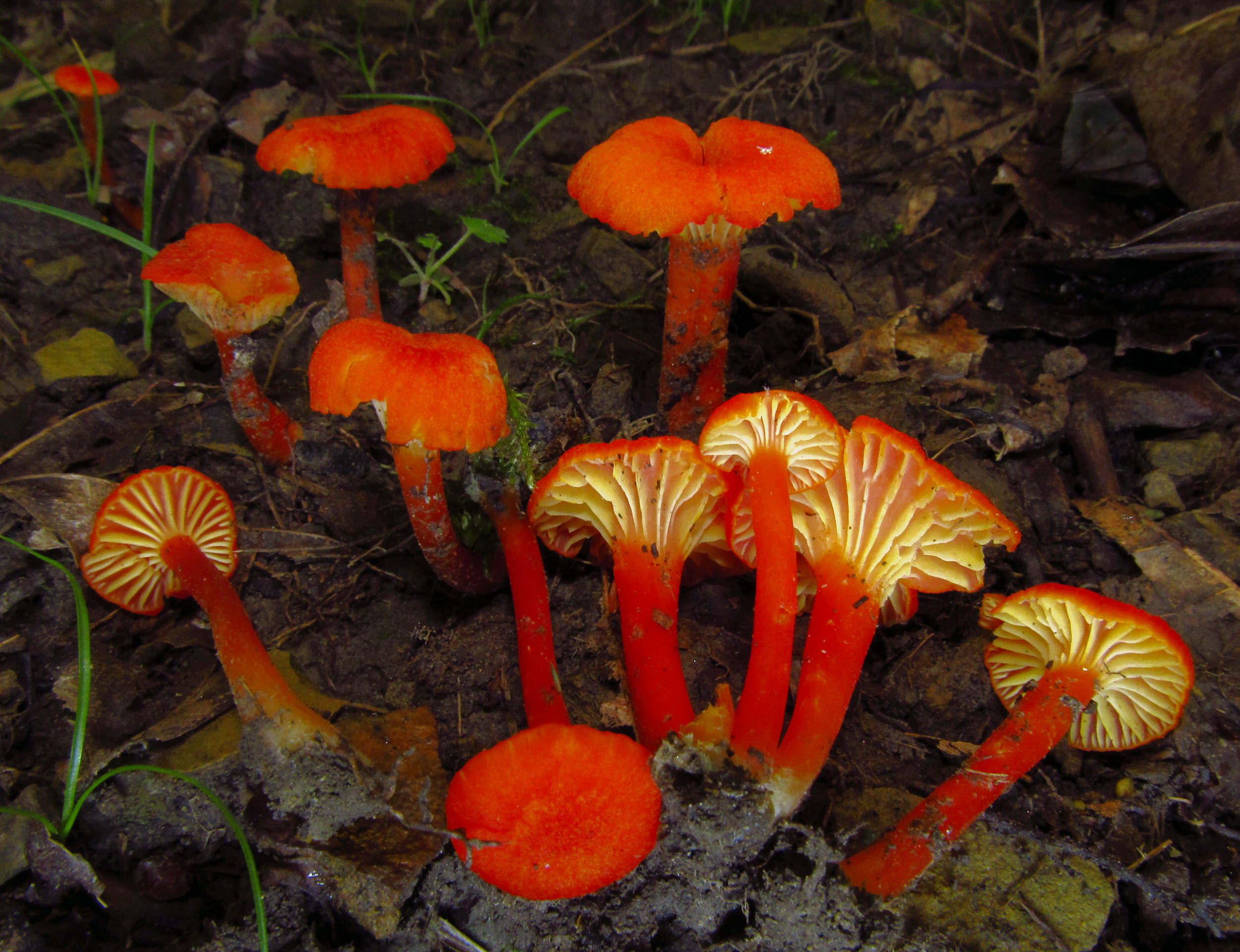
- Hygrocybe cantharellus

Scientific classification
- Kingdom: Fungi
- Division: Basidiomycota
- Class: Agaricomycetes
- Order: Agaricales
- Family: Hygrophoraceae
- Genus: Hygrocybe (Fr.) P.Kumm. (1871)

Type species
- Hygrocybe conica (Schaeff.) P.Kumm. (1871)

Synonyms
- Godfrinia Maire (1902); Bertrandia R.Heim (1936); Pseudohygrocybe (Bon) Kovalenko (1988)

= Hygrocybe =

Genus of fungi

Hygrocybe is a genus of agarics (gilled fungi) in the family Hygrophoraceae. Called waxcaps in English (sometimes waxy caps in North America), basidiocarps (fruit bodies) are often brightly coloured and have dry to waxy caps, white spores, and smooth, ringless stems.

In Europe waxcaps are characteristic of old, unimproved grasslands (termed waxcap grasslands) which are a declining habitat, making many Hygrocybe species of conservation concern. Nine of these waxcap-grassland species, Hygrocybe aurantiosplendens, H. citrinovirens, H. intermedia, H. mucronella, H. punicea, H. quieta, H. spadicea, H. splendidissima, and H. subpapillata, are assessed as globally "vulnerable" on the IUCN Red List of Threatened Species. Elsewhere waxcaps are more typically found in woodlands. Most are ground-dwelling and all are believed to be biotrophs. Around 150 species are recognized worldwide. Fruit bodies of several species are considered edible and are sometimes sold in local markets.

== Taxonomy ==
=== History ===
Hygrocybe was first published in 1821 by Swedish mycologist Elias Magnus Fries as a subsection of Agaricus and in 1871 was raised to the rank of genus by Kummer. In several papers, Karsten and Murrill used the name Hydrocybe, but this is now taken as an orthographic variant of Hygrocybe. The generic name is derived from the Greek ῦγρὁς (= moist) + κυβη (= head).

Despite its comparatively early publication, the genus Hygrocybe was not widely accepted until the 1970s, most previous authors treating it as a synonym of Hygrophorus, a related genus of ectomycorrhizal agarics.

=== Current status ===
Recent molecular research, based on cladistic analysis of DNA sequences, has shown that Hygrocybe sensu lato is paraphyletic and does not form a single clade within the Hygrophoraceae. As a result, many species formerly referred to Hygrocybe have been transferred to the genera Chromosera, Cuphophyllus, Gliophorus, Gloioxanthomyces, Humidicutis, Neohygrocybe, or Porpolomopsis. This leaves Hygrocybe sensu stricto as a smaller but more cohesive genus of species related to the type, Hygrocybe conica.

No comprehensive monograph of the genus has yet been published. In Europe, however, species of Hygrocybe have been illustrated and described in a standard English-language guide by Boertmann (2010) and also (together with Hygrophorus) in an Italian guide by Candusso (1997). European species have also been covered, more briefly, in descriptive French keys by Bon (1990). Dutch species were illustrated and described by Arnolds (1990). No equivalent modern guides have been published for North America, the most recent being by Hesler & Smith (1963). There is, however, a guide to Californian species by Largent (1985). In Australia, Hygrocybe species have been illustrated and described by Young (2005) and in New Zealand by Horak (1990).

=== Species ===
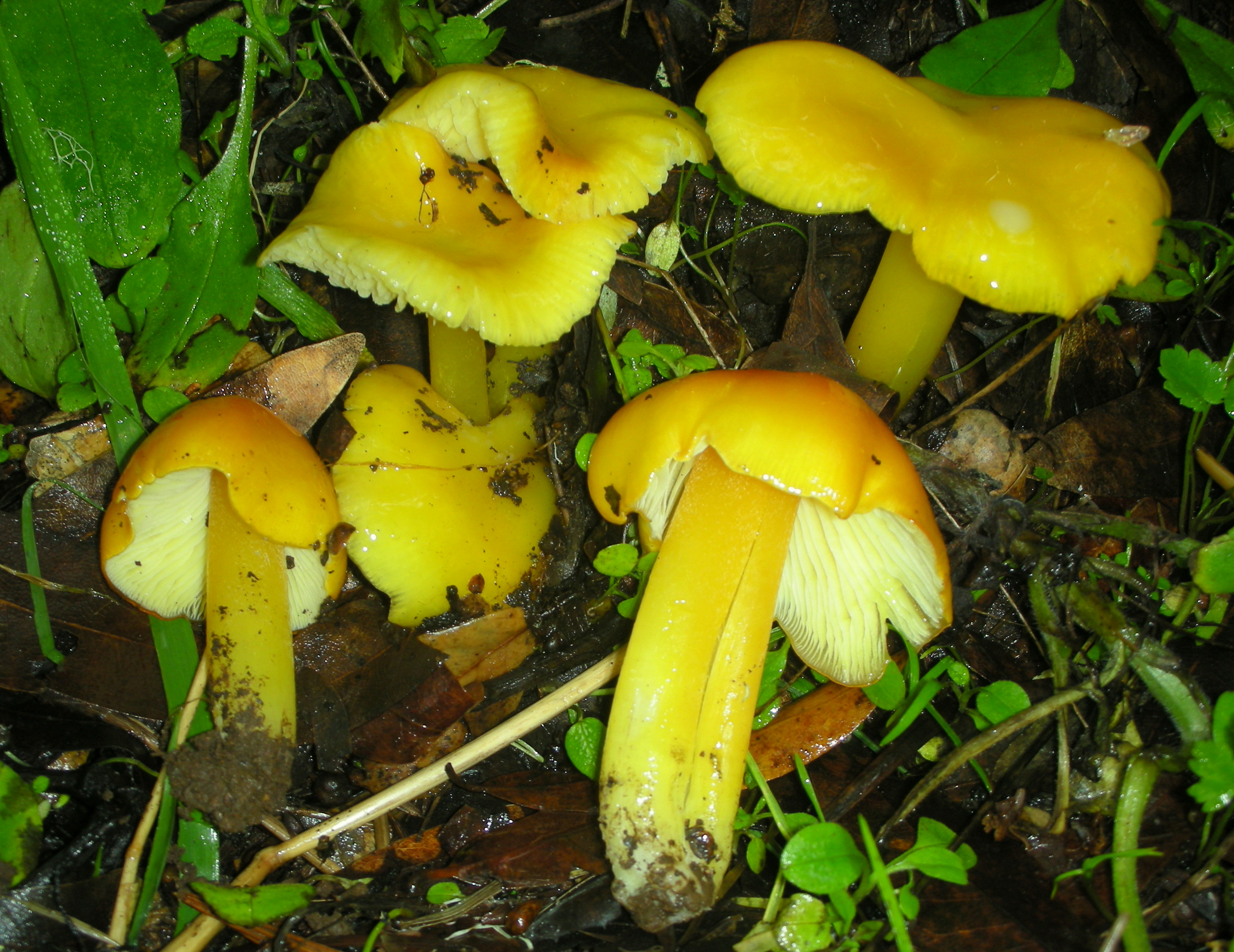
Hygrocybe flavescens

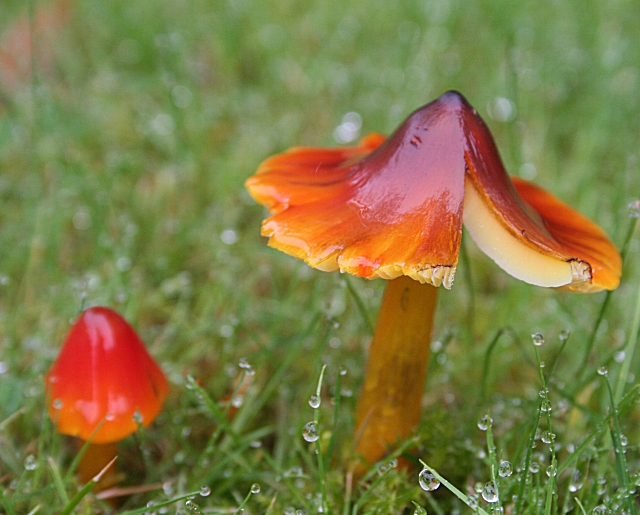
Hygrocybe conica

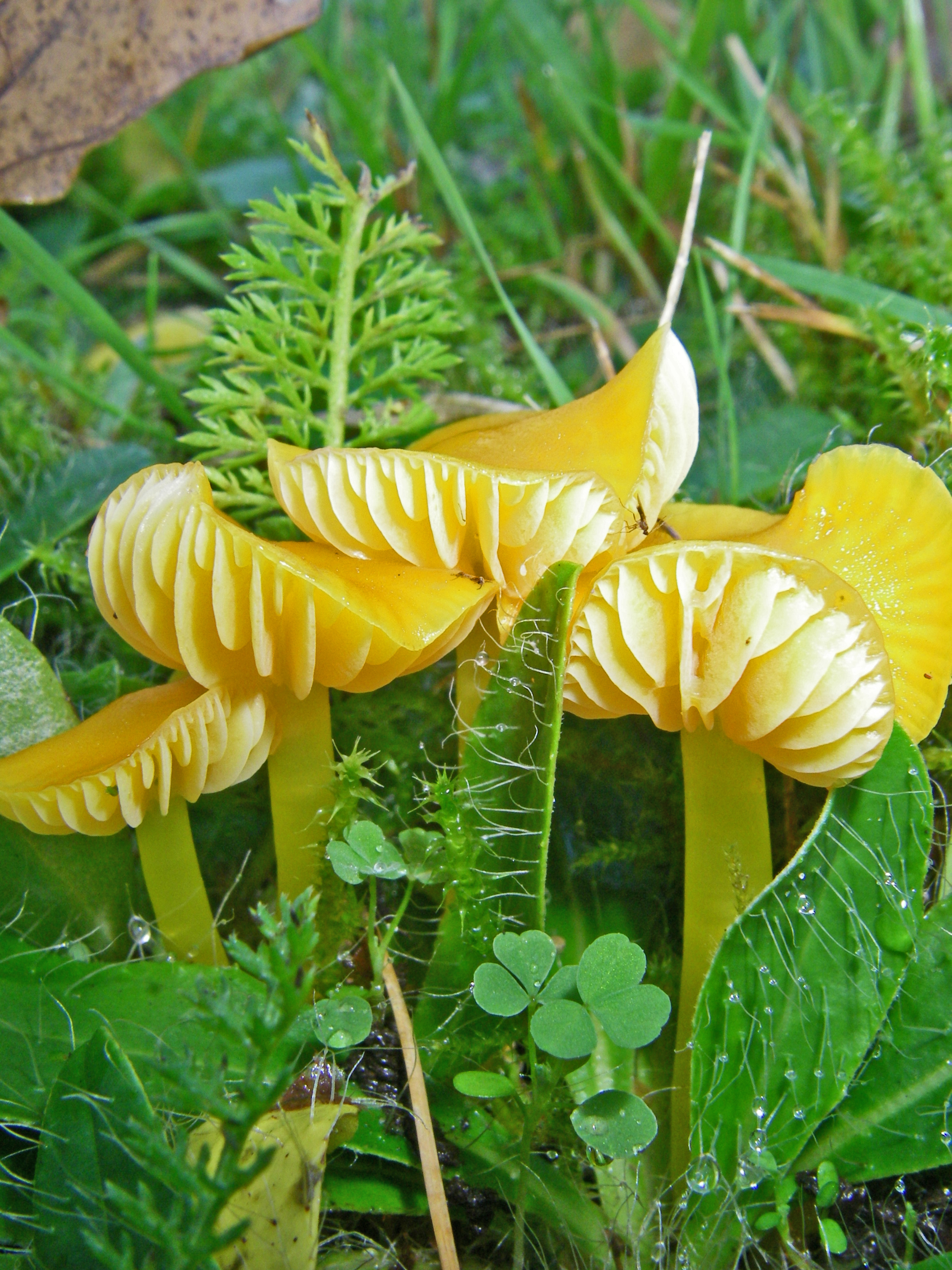
H. chlorophana

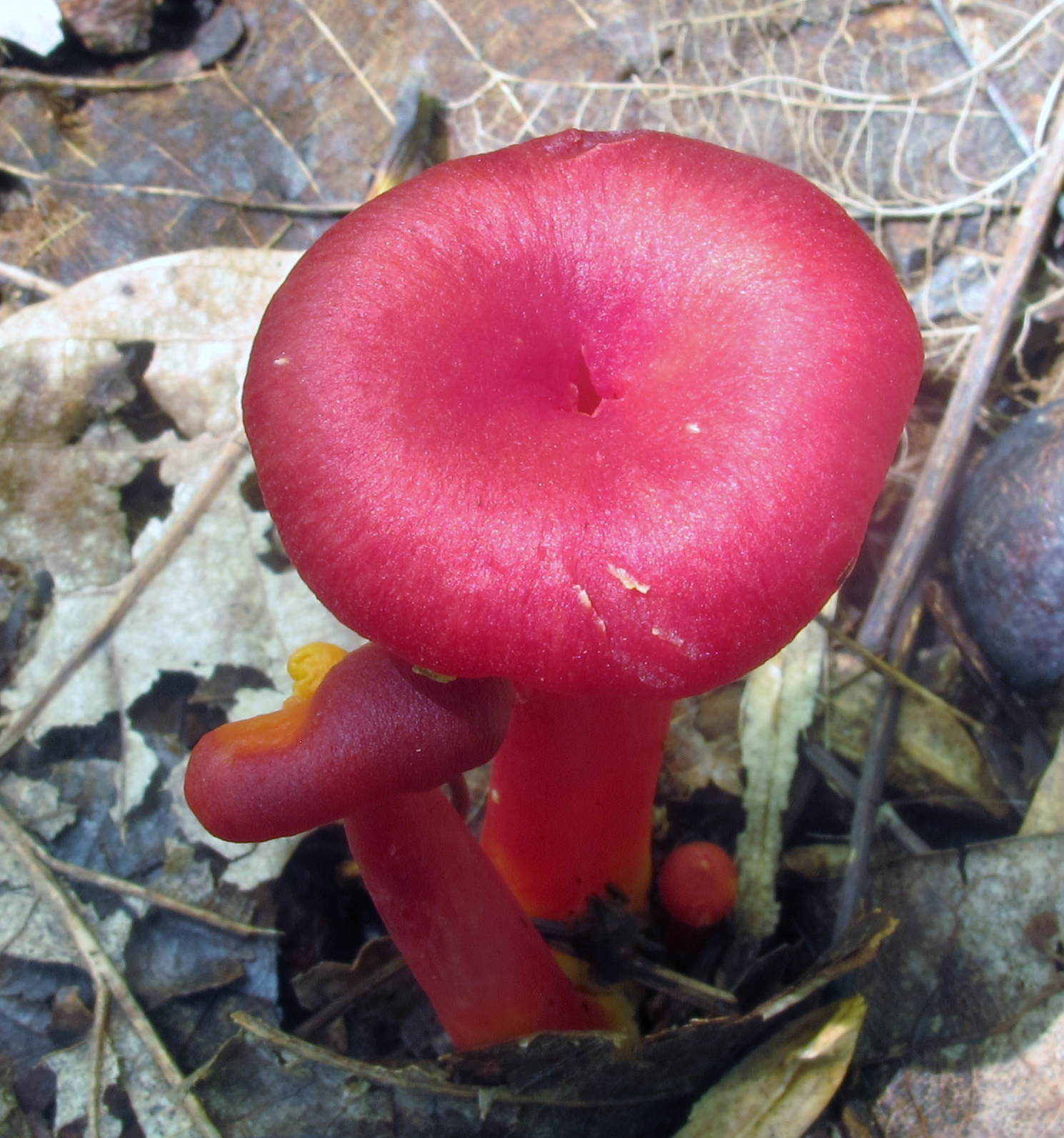
H. appalachianensis

== Description ==
Fruit bodies of Hygrocybe species are all agaricoid, most (but not all) having smooth to slightly scaly caps that are convex to conical and dry to waxy or viscid when damp. Many (but not all) are brightly coloured in shades of red, orange, or yellow. Where present, the gills beneath the cap are often equally coloured and usually distant, thick, and waxy. One atypical South American species, Hygrocybe aphylla, lacks gills. The stems of Hygrocybe species lack a ring. The spore print is white. Fruit bodies of some species, notably Hygrocybe conica, blacken with age or when bruised. Microscopically, Hygrocybe species lack true cystidia and have comparatively large, smooth, inamyloid basidiospores.

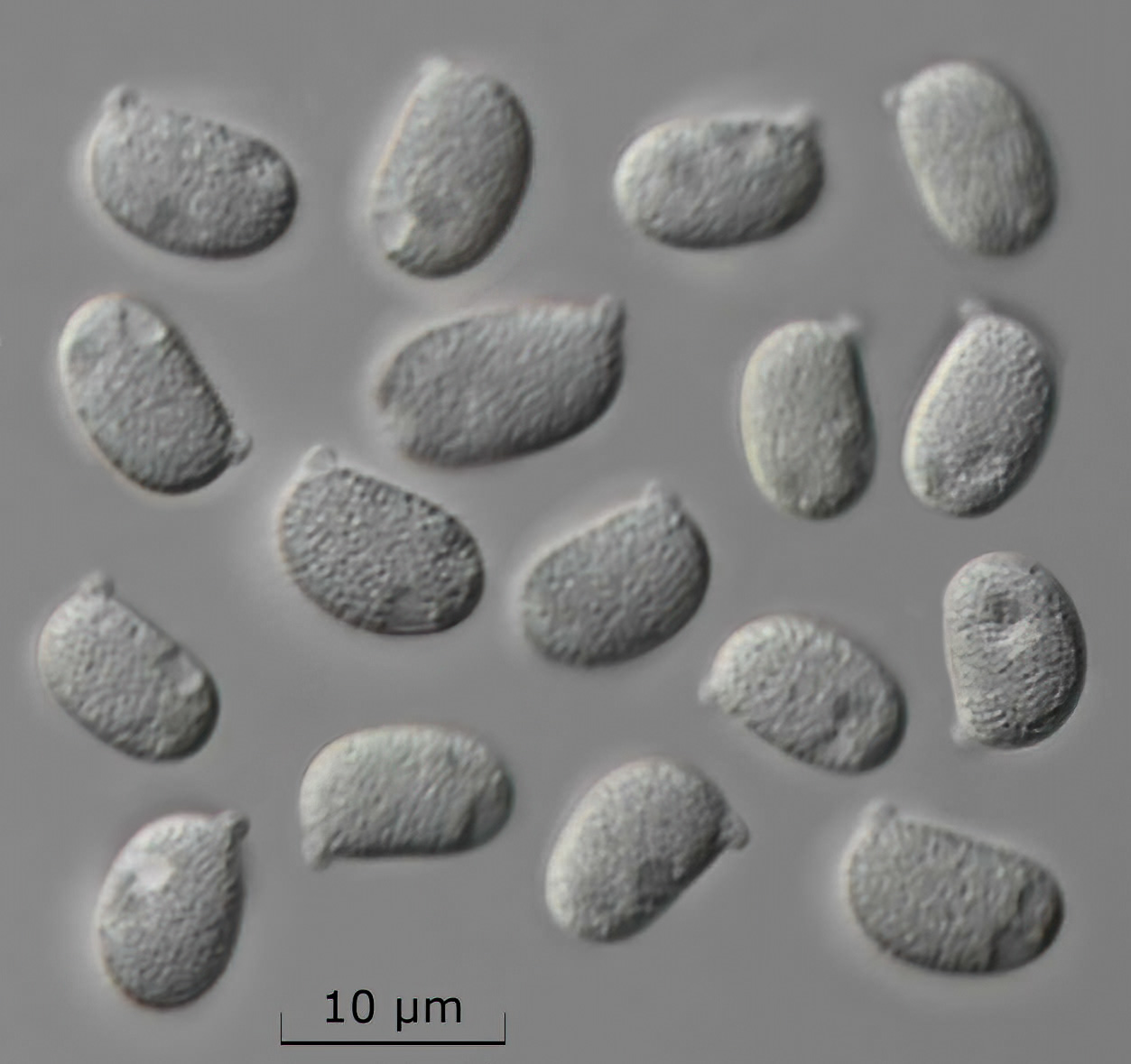
Hygrocybe singeri spores 1000x

== Habitat, nutrition, and distribution ==
Species of Hygrocybe are soil-dwelling. In Europe, most species are typical of unimproved (nutrient-poor), short-sward grasslands, often termed "waxcap grasslands", but elsewhere they are more commonly found in woodland.

Their metabolism has long been debated, but recent research suggests that they are not saprotrophic but rather symbiotically associated with the roots of higher plants or mosses. Hyphae of H. conica have been detected in plant roots.

Species are distributed worldwide, from the tropics to the sub-polar regions. Around 150 have been described to date. Waxcaps receive most attention in northern Europe, where they are found in nutrient-poor pastures. However, outside Europe, waxcaps are more commonly associated with woodland habitats, for example the sclerophyll forests site at Lane Cove Bushland Park and Ferndale Park, Sydney.

== Conservation ==
In Europe, waxcap grasslands and their associated fungi are of conservation concern, since unimproved grasslands (formerly commonplace) have declined dramatically as a result of changes in agricultural practice. This decline has led to nine European Hygrocybe species, Hygrocybe aurantiosplendens, H. citrinovirens, H. intermedia, H. mucronella, H. punicea, H. quieta, H. spadicea, H. splendidissima, and H. subpapillata, being assessed as globally "vulnerable" on the IUCN Red List of Threatened Species.

Elsewhere, several rare and localized endemic species are assessed as globally "endangered" on the IUCN Red List of Threatened Species. They include Hygrocybe boothii in Australia, Hygrocybe noelokelani and Hygrocybe pakelo in Hawaii, Hygrocybe striatella in Chile, and Hygrocybe flavifolia in California.

== Uses ==
Because Hygrocybe species cannot be maintained in axenic culture, there are no commercial uses.

Fruit bodies of a few species are considered edible in eastern Europe, south-east Asia, and Central America and are collected and consumed by the local villagers.
