= List of fungi of Metropolitan France =

This article is about the fungal life of Metropolitan France. For the fungi in the French Overseas territories, see: Fungi of French Guiana, Fungi of French Polynesia, Fungi of Martinique, Fungi of Réunion, Fungi of Guadeloupe and Fungi of Mayotte.

Fungi include:

- Agaricus bisporus, the common mushroom
- Boletus edulis, the cep
- Tuber melanosporum, the black Périgord truffle

Other edible species:

- Agaricus aestivalis
- Agaricus annae
- Agaricus arvensis
- Agaricus augustus
- Agaricus benesii
- Agaricus bitorquis
- Agaricus campestris
- Agaricus essettei
- Agaricus haemorrhoidarius
- Agaricus langei
- Agaricus macrocarpus
- Agaricus macrosporus
- Agaricus nivescens
- Agaricus silvaticus
- Agaricus silvicola
- Agrocybe cylindracea
- Agrocybe praecox
- Aleuria aurantia
- Amanita aspera
- Amanita caesarea
- Amanita crocea
- Amanita fulva
- Amanita lividopallescens
- Amanita ovoidea
- Amanita rubescens
- Amanita spissa
- Amanita vaginata
- Auricularia auricula-judae
- Balsamia vulgaris
- Boletus aereus
- Boletus aestivalis
- Boletus appendiculatus
- Boletus betulicola
- Boletus depilatus
- Boletus erythropus
- Boletus fechtneri
- Boletus impolitus
- Boletus luridus
- Boletus mamorensis
- Boletus persoonii
- Boletus pinophilus
- Boletus pseudoregius
- Boletus queletii
- Boletus regius
- Boletus subappendiculatus
- Bovista nigrescens
- Calocybe gambosa
- Cantharellus amethysteus
- Cantharellus cibarius
- Cantharellus ferruginascens
- Cantharellus subpruinosus
- Cantharellus friesii
- Choiromyces venosus
- Chroogomphus helveticus
- Chroogomphus rutilus
- Clavariadelphus pistillaris
- Clavulina rugosa
- Clitocybe alexandri
- Clitocybe costata
- Clitocybe geotropa
- Clitocybe gibba
- Clitocybe odora
- Clitopilus prunulus
- Collybia fusipes
- Coprinus comatus
- Cortinarius alboviolaceus
- Cortinarius largus
- Cortinarius praestans
- Craterellus cornucopioides
- Craterellus cinereus
- Craterellus crispus
- Craterellus ianthinoxanthus
- Craterellus konradii
- Craterellus lutescens
- Craterellus melanoxeros
- Craterellus tubaeformis
- Craterellus tubaeformis var.lutescens
- Craterellus undulatus
- Cuphophyllus colemannianus
- Cuphophyllus niveus
- Cuphophyllus pratensis
- Cuphophyllus virgineus
- Dendropolyporus umbellatus
- Disciotis venosa
- Entoloma aprile
- Entoloma clypeatum
- Entoloma sepium
- Fistulina hepatica
- Flammulina velutipes
- Gomphidius glutinosus
- Gomphus clavatus
- Grifola frondosa
- Gyroporus cyanescens
- Hebeloma edurum
- Hydnum repandum
- Hydnum rufescens
- Hygrophoropsis aurantiaca
- Hygrophorus camarophyllus
- Hygrophorus capreolarius
- Hygrophorus penarius
- Hygrophorus poetarum
- Hygrophorus russula
- Imleria badia
- Kuehneromyces mutabilis
- Laccaria affinis
- Laccaria amethystina
- Laccaria bicolor
- Laccaria fraterna
- Laccaria laccata
- Lactarius deliciosus
- Lactarius deterrimus
- Lactarius lignyotus
- Lactarius picinus
- Lactarius sanguifluus
- Lactarius semisanguifluus
- Lactarius vinosus
- Lactarius volemus
- Laetiporus sulphureus
- Langermannia gigantea
- Leccinum aurantiacum
- Leccinum crocipodium
- Leccinum duriusculum
- leccinum quercinum
- Leccinum versipelle
- Leccinum vulpinum
- Lentinellus cochleatus
- Lentinula edodes
- Lentinus cyathiformis
- Lepista flaccida
- Lepista glaucocana
- Lepista inversa
- Lepista irina
- Lepista nuda
- Lepista panaeolus
- Lepista saeva
- Lepista sordida
- Lespiaultinia oligosperma
- Leucoagaricus leucothites
- Leucocortinarius bulbiger
- Leucopaxillus giganteus
- Lycoperdon perlatum
- Lyophyllum decastes
- Macrolepiota excoriata
- Macrolepiota gracilenta
- Macrolepiota konradii
- Macrolepiota mastoidea
- Macrolepiota procera
- Macrolepiota rhacodes
- Marasmius oreades
- Meripilus giganteus
- Mitrophora fusca
- Mitrophora semilibera
- Morchella atrotomentosa
- Morchella conica
- Morchella costata
- Morchella crassipes
- Morchella deliciosa
- Morchella distans
- Morchella elata
- Morchella esculenta
- Morchella hortensis
- Morchella olivea
- Morchella pragensis
- Morchella rotunda
- Morchella rudis
- Morchella umbrinovelutipes
- Otidea onotica
- Phaeolepiota aurea
- Pholiota nameko
- Pleurotus citrinopileatus
- Pleurotus columbinus
- Pleurotus cornucopiae
- Pleurotus dryinus
- Pleurotus eryngii
- Pleurotus nebrodensis
- Pleurotus ostreatus
- Pleurotus pulmonarius
- Pleurotus salmoneostramineus
- Pseudohydnum gelatinosum
- Ramaria aurea
- Ramaria botrytis
- Rozites caperatus
- Russula cutefracta
- Russula cyanoxantha
- Russula cyanoxantha var.peltereaui
- Russula heterophylla
- Russula mustelina
- Russula vesca
- Russula grisea
- Russula virescens
- Scutiger ovinus
- Scutiger pes-caprae
- Sparassis brevipes
- Sparassis crispa
- Strobilurus esculentus
- Strobilurus stephanocystis
- Stropharia rugosoannulata
- Suillus bellinii
- Suillus collinitus
- Suillus granulatus
- Suillus grevillei
- Suillus luteus
- Terfezia arenaria
- Terfezia claveryi
- Tremiscus helvelloides
- Tricholoma argyraceum
- Tricholoma atrosquamosum
- Tricholoma basirubens
- Tricholoma caligatum
- Tricholoma cingulatum
- Tricholoma colossus
- Tricholoma columbetta
- Tricholoma gausapatum
- Tricholoma inocyboides
- Tricholoma myomyces
- Tricholoma orirubens
- Tricholoma portentosum
- Tricholoma scalpturatum
- Tricholoma squarrulosum
- Tricholoma terreum
- Tuber aestivum
- Tuber blotii
- Tuber borchii
- Tuber brumale
- Tuber macrosporum
- Tuber mesentericum
- Tuber uncinatum
- Verpa bohemica
- Verpa conica
- Volvariella bombycina
- Volvariella speciosa
- Volvariella volvacea
- Xerocomus armeniacus
- Xerocomus chrysenteron
- Xerocomus communis
- Xerocomus ferrugineus
- Xerocomus lanatus
- Xerocomus pruinatus
- Xerocomus rubellus
- Xerocomus subtomentosus

== See also ==
- Fungi of Australia
- Wildlife of Metropolitan France
- Outline of France
