= List of Hygrophorus species =

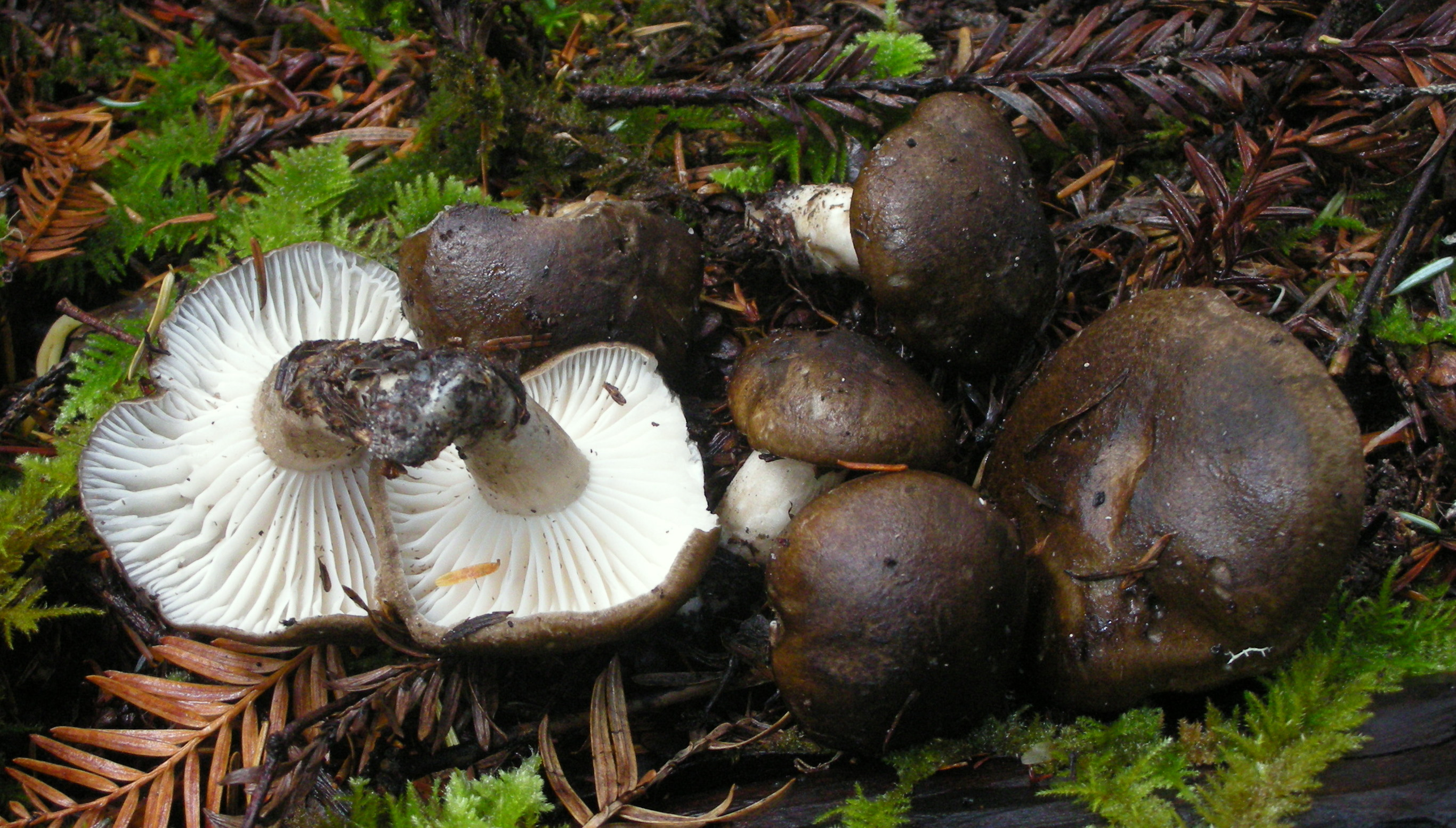
H. camarophyllus, an edible mushroom

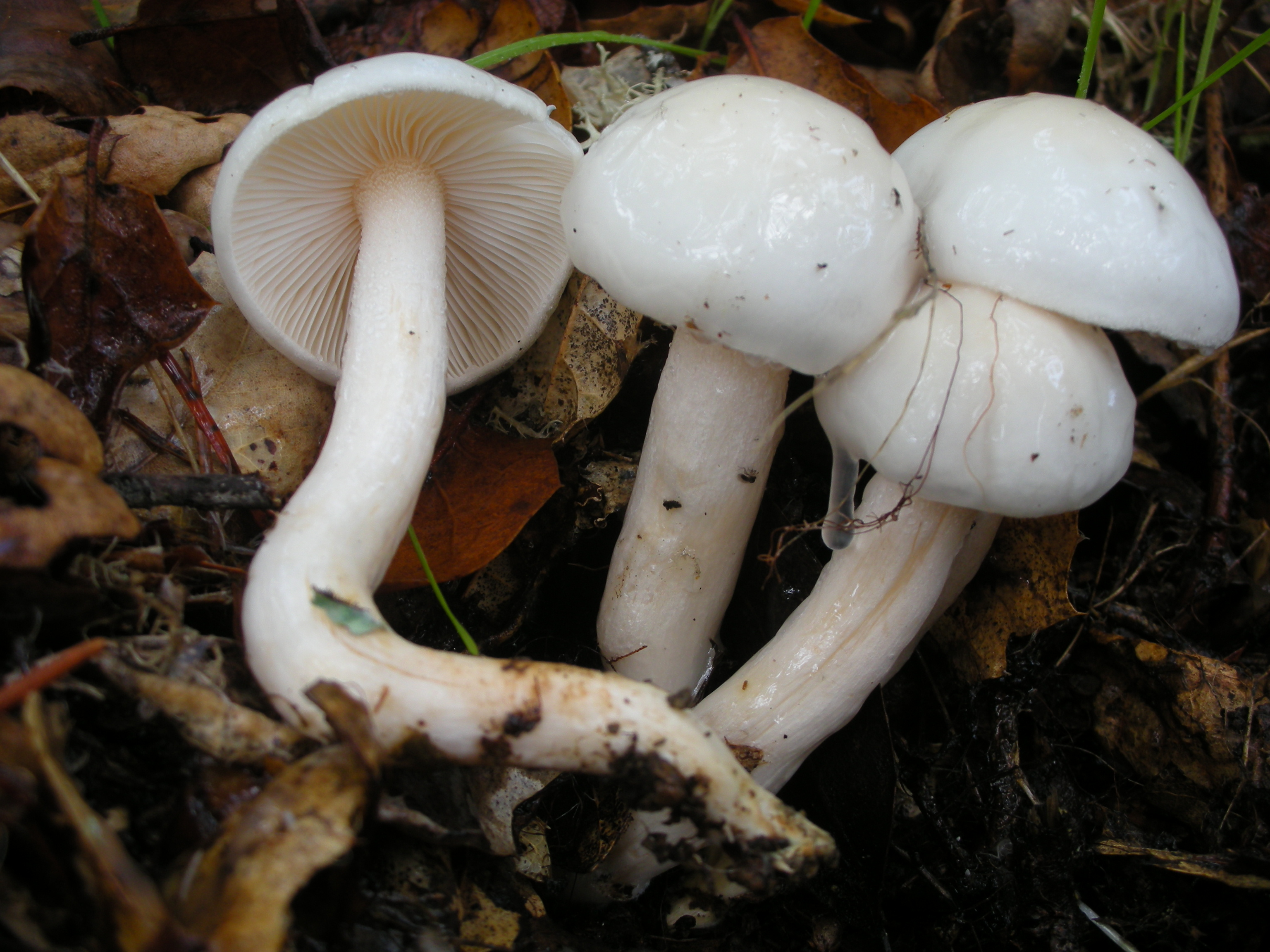
Genus type species - H. eburneus, California

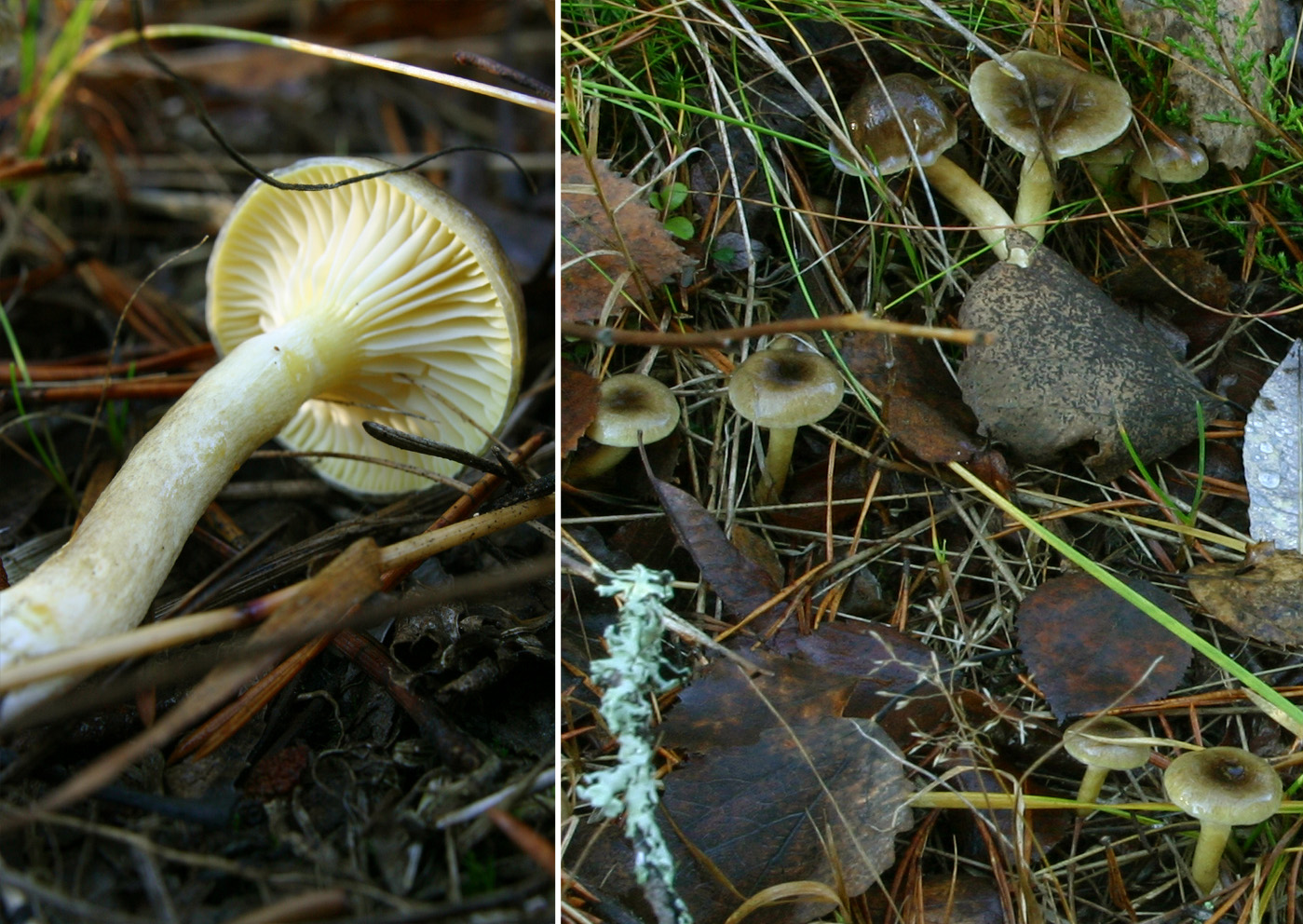
H. hypothejus, Finland

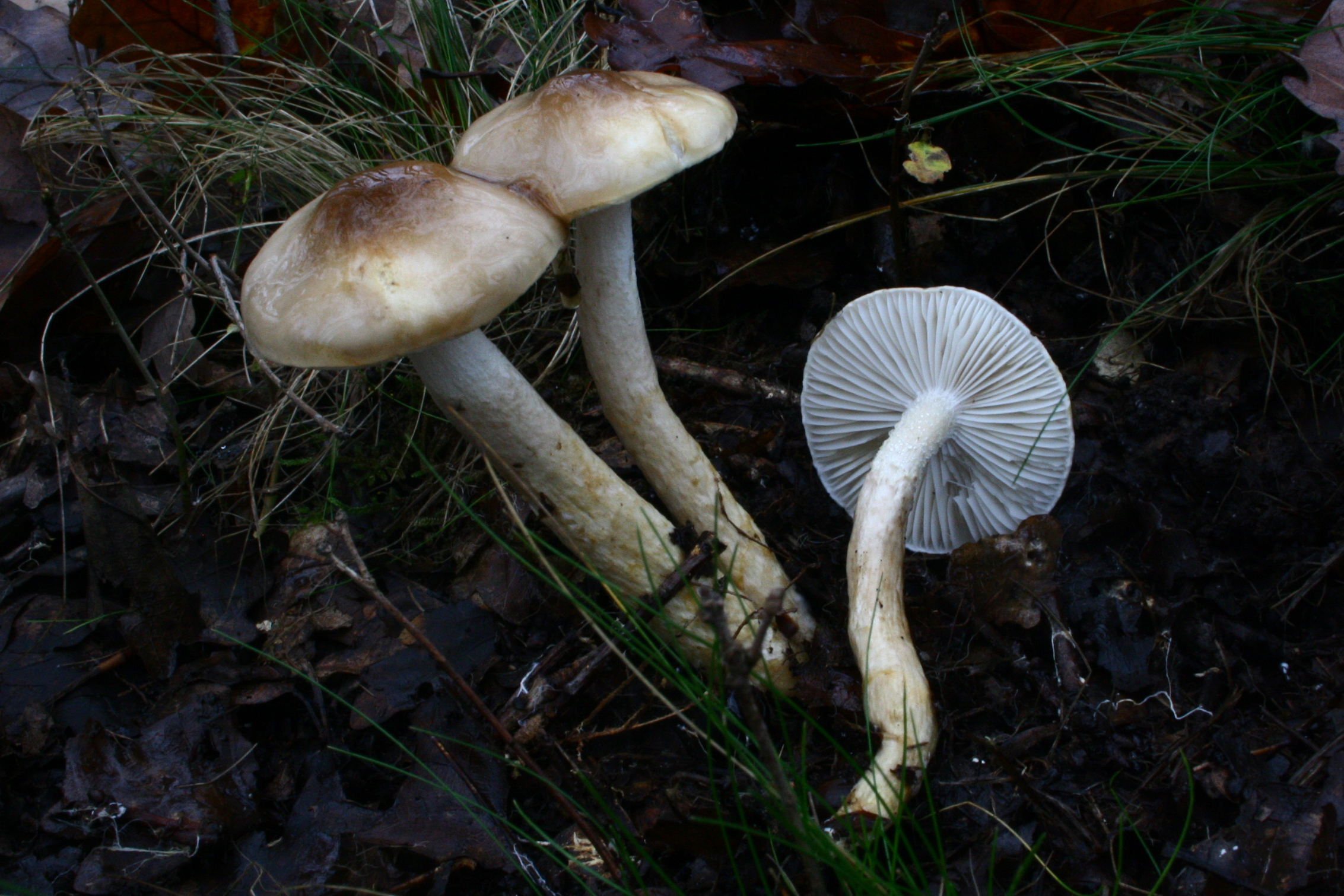
H. persoonii, France

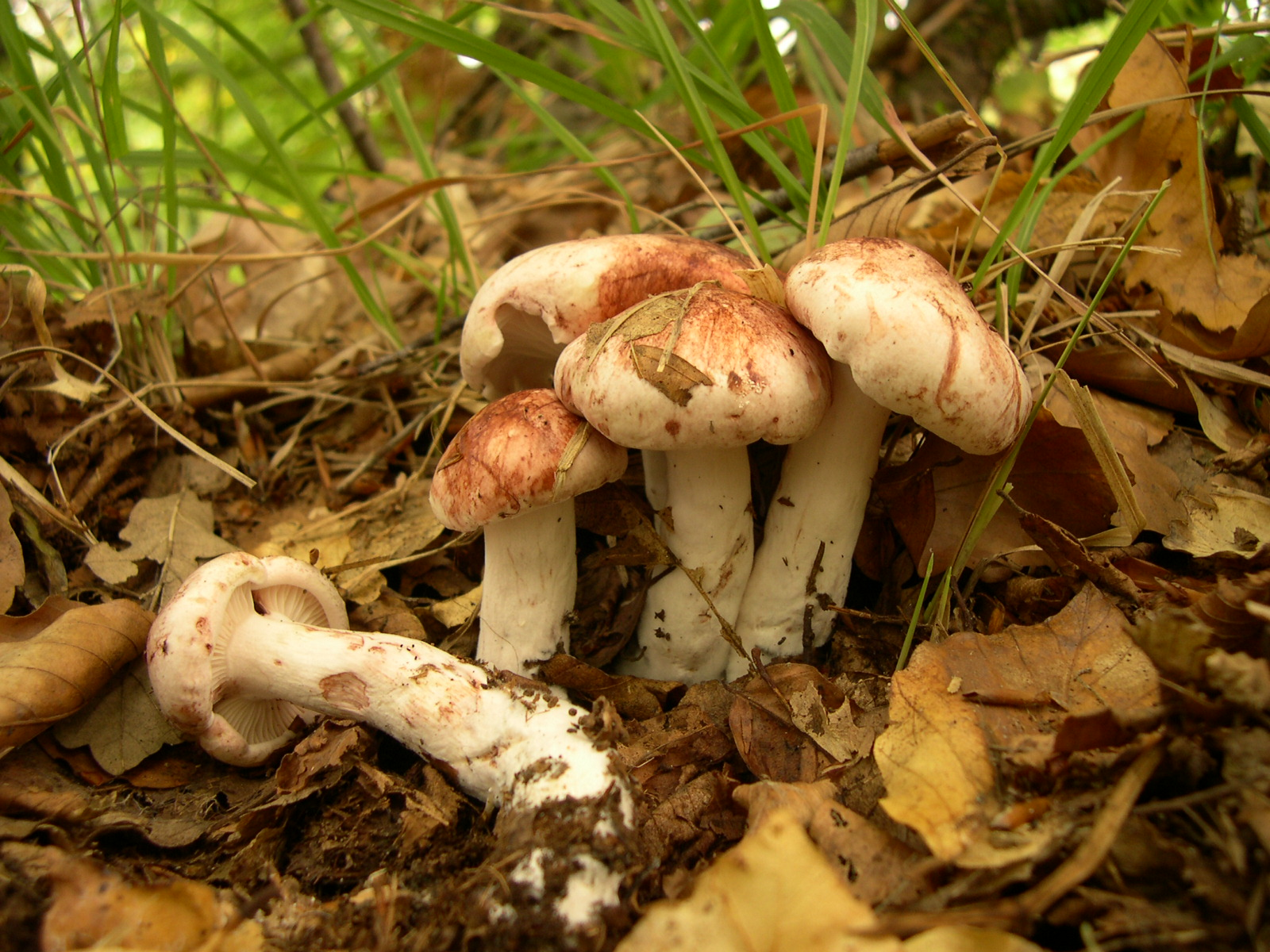
H. russula, Italy

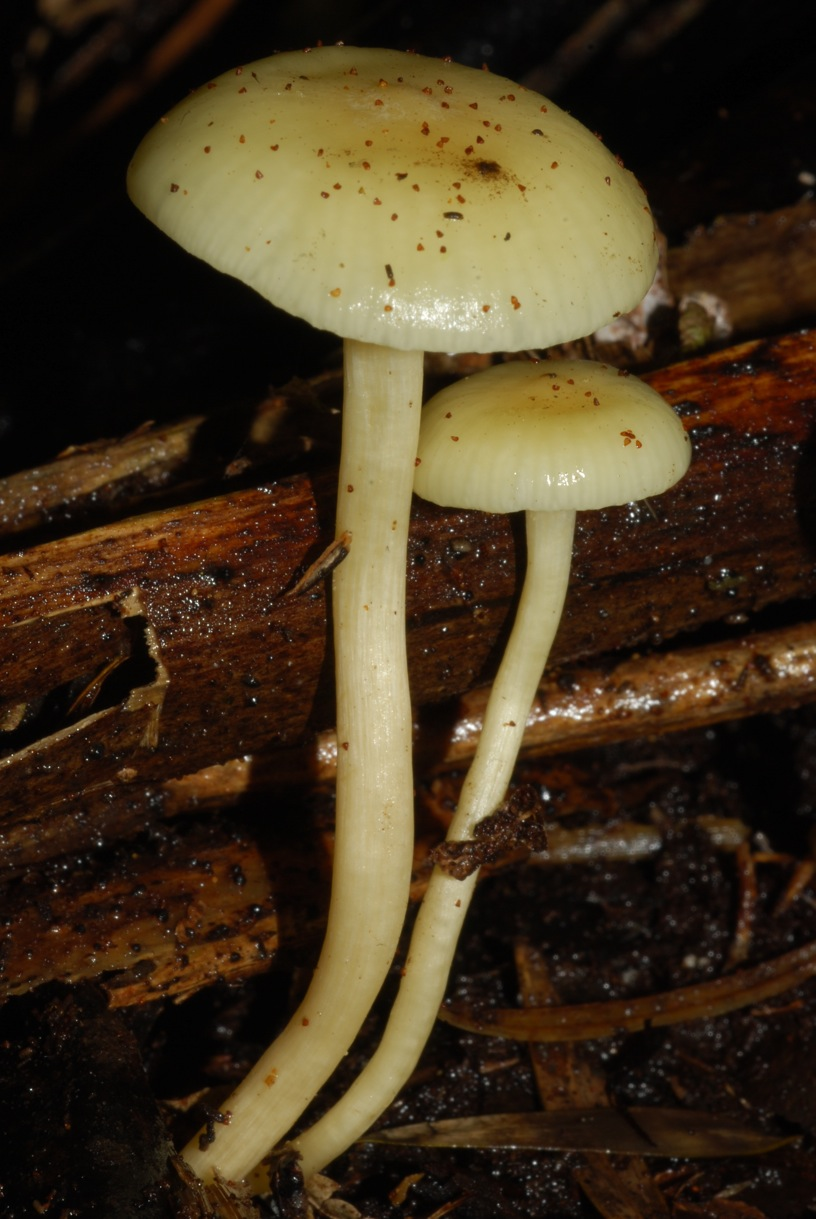
H. salmonipes, New Zealand

A list of fungus species of the genus Hygrophorus appears below. Many species formerly included in this genus are now placed in the genus Hygrocybe. There are approximately 100 species in the genus.

- Hygrophorus abieticola
- Hygrophorus acutus
- Hygrophorus adiaphorus
- Hygrophorus agathosmus - gray almond waxy cap, almond woodwax
- Hygrophorus albicarneus
- Hygrophorus albicastaneus
- Hygrophorus albiflavus
- Hygrophorus albinellus
- Hygrophorus albipes
- Hygrophorus albofuscus
- Hygrophorus alboumbonatus
- Hygrophorus amarus
- Hygrophorus amygdalinus
- Hygrophorus arbustivus
- Hygrophorus arenicola
- Hygrophorus arnoldae
- Hygrophorus atramentosus
- Hygrophorus atro-olivaceus
- Hygrophorus aurantiacus
- Hygrophorus avellaneifolius
- Hygrophorus badakensis
- Hygrophorus bakerensis
- Hygrophorus bakeri
- Hygrophorus barbatulus
- Hygrophorus bipindiensis
- Hygrophorus brevipes
- Hygrophorus buccinulus
- Hygrophorus burgdorfensis
- Hygrophorus burnhamii
- Hygrophorus caeruleus
- Hygrophorus caespitosus
- Hygrophorus camarophylloides
- Hygrophorus camarophyllus - arched woodwax
- Hygrophorus carcharias
- Hygrophorus carnescens
- Hygrophorus cavipes
- Hygrophorus chrysoconos
- Hygrophorus chrysodon - gold flecked woodwax
- Hygrophorus cinereipallens
- Hygrophorus cokeri
- Hygrophorus coloratus
- Hygrophorus compressus
- Hygrophorus congelatus
- Hygrophorus conicopalustris
- Hygrophorus constans
- Hygrophorus corticola
- Hygrophorus cossus
- Hygrophorus cremeus
- Hygrophorus cremicolor
- Hygrophorus croceophyllus
- Hygrophorus croceus
- Hygrophorus decipiens
- Hygrophorus diaphanes
- Hygrophorus dichrous
- Hygrophorus discoxanthus (formerly H. chrysaspis) + * North American species of Hygrophorus by L.R. Hesler and Alexander H. Smith, 1963. (Full text of monograph) - yellowing woodwax
- Hygrophorus eburneiformis
- Hygrophorus eburneus - ivory woodwax
- Hygrophorus elegans
- Hygrophorus elegantulus
- Hygrophorus ellenae
- Hygrophorus erubescens - blotched woodwax
- Hygrophorus fagi
- Hygrophorus fallax
- Hygrophorus fibrillosus
- Hygrophorus flavonitens
- Hygrophorus fleischerianus
- Hygrophorus foliirubens
- Hygrophorus fragicolor
- Hygrophorus fragrans
- Hygrophorus fuligineus
- Hygrophorus fulvosiformis
- Hygrophorus fumosellus
- Hygrophorus furcatus
- Hygrophorus fuscoalboides
- Hygrophorus fuscovillosulus
- Hygrophorus gedehensis
- Hygrophorus globisporus
- Hygrophorus gloriae
- Hygrophorus glutinosus
- Hygrophorus goetzii
- Hygrophorus gomphidioides
- Hygrophorus graciae
- Hygrophorus graveolens
- Hygrophorus hedrychii
- Hygrophorus hiemalis
- Hygrophorus hispidus
- Hygrophorus hyacinthus
- Hygrophorus hypholomoides
- Hygrophorus hypothejus - herald of winter (Europe)
- Hygrophorus igneus
- Hygrophorus imazekii
- Hygrophorus impudicus
- Hygrophorus inocybiformis
- Hygrophorus inocyboides
- Hygrophorus involutus
- Hygrophorus isabellinus
- Hygrophorus jozzolus
- Hygrophorus juruensis
- Hygrophorus kauffmanii
- Hygrophorus kilimandscharicus
- Hygrophorus korhonenii
- Hygrophorus lactarioides
- Hygrophorus latitabundus
- Hygrophorus lawrencei
- Hygrophorus leucophaeo-ilicis
- Hygrophorus lignicola
- Hygrophorus lilacinogriseus
- Hygrophorus limosus
- Hygrophorus lindtneri
- Hygrophorus lucorum - larch woodwax
- Hygrophorus luridoflavus
- Hygrophorus mamillatus
- Hygrophorus marianae
- Hygrophorus maroniensis
- Hygrophorus marzuolus
- Hygrophorus megasporus
- Hygrophorus meridionalis
- Hygrophorus mesotephrus - ashen woodwax
- Hygrophorus mexicanus
- Hygrophorus montanus
- Hygrophorus monticola
- Hygrophorus morrisii
- Hygrophorus mugnalus
- Hygrophorus multifolius
- Hygrophorus mutabilis
- Hygrophorus nemoreus - oak woodwax
- Hygrophorus nigridius
- Hygrophorus niveicolor
- Hygrophorus nordmanensis
- Hygrophorus nothofagi
- Hygrophorus obconicus
- Hygrophorus obscuratus
- Hygrophorus occidentalis
- Hygrophorus ochraceomellinus
- Hygrophorus odoratus
- Hygrophorus olivaceoalbus
- Hygrophorus olivaceonitens
- Hygrophorus olivaceus
- Hygrophorus olivascens
- Hygrophorus opacoides
- Hygrophorus pacificus
- Hygrophorus paigei
- Hygrophorus pallidus
- Hygrophorus paludosoides
- Hygrophorus paludosus
- Hygrophorus palustris
- Hygrophorus patagonicus
- Hygrophorus penarioides
- Hygrophorus penarius - matt woodwax
- Hygrophorus perfumus
- Hygrophorus persicolor
- Hygrophorus persoonii (formerly H. limacinus)
- Hygrophorus piceae
- Hygrophorus pinetorum
- Hygrophorus pinophilus
- Hygrophorus plumbeus
- Hygrophorus poetarum
- Hygrophorus proximus
- Hygrophorus pseudochrysaspis
- Hygrophorus pseudococcineus
- Hygrophorus pseudodiscoideus
- Hygrophorus pseudoericeus
- Hygrophorus pseudoisabellinus
- Hygrophorus pseudolucorum
- Hygrophorus pseudopallidus
- Hygrophorus pseudoparvulus
- Hygrophorus pseudotephroleucus
- Hygrophorus pudorinus - rosy woodwax
- Hygrophorus pulcherrimus
- Hygrophorus purpurascens
- Hygrophorus purpureobadius
- Hygrophorus pustulatus (edible)
- Hygrophorus pyrophilus
- Hygrophorus quadricolor
- Hygrophorus quercuum
- Hygrophorus recurvatus
- Hygrophorus robustus
- Hygrophorus roseiceps
- Hygrophorus roseobrunneus
- Hygrophorus roseodiscoideus
- Hygrophorus roseus
- Hygrophorus rubellus
- Hygrophorus rubripes
- Hygrophorus rubrococcineus
- Hygrophorus rubropunctus
- Hygrophorus rufus
- Hygrophorus russula - pinkmottle woodwax
- Hygrophorus russuliformis
- Hygrophorus salmonipes
- Hygrophorus salmonicolor
- Hygrophorus saxatilis
- Hygrophorus secretanii
- Hygrophorus segregatus
- Hygrophorus serotinus
- Hygrophorus siccipes
- Hygrophorus siccus
- Hygrophorus silvaticus
- Hygrophorus sitchensis
- Hygrophorus sordidus
- Hygrophorus speciosus
- Hygrophorus sphaerosporus
- Hygrophorus spodoleucus
- Hygrophorus squamulifer
- Hygrophorus stagninus
- Hygrophorus stowellii
- Hygrophorus subalpinus - subalpine waxycap
- Hygrophorus subaromaticus
- Hygrophorus subaustraligus
- Hygrophorus subbasidiosus
- Hygrophorus subcaespitosus
- Hygrophorus subcitrinopallidus
- Hygrophorus subcoccineus
- Hygrophorus subconicus
- Hygrophorus subellenae
- Hygrophorus subflavidus
- Hygrophorus subfusoideus
- Hygrophorus subisabellinus
- Hygrophorus sublutescens
- Hygrophorus subminiatus
- Hygrophorus subniveus
- Hygrophorus subolivaceoalbus
- Hygrophorus subpratensis
- Hygrophorus subpungens
- Hygrophorus subpustulatus
- Hygrophorus subruber
- Hygrophorus subrufescens
- Hygrophorus subsalmonius
- Hygrophorus subsordidus
- Hygrophorus subvirgineus
- Hygrophorus subviscifer
- Hygrophorus suzannae
- Hygrophorus sydowianus
- Hygrophorus tahquamenonensis
- Hygrophorus tenax
- Hygrophorus tennesseensis
- Hygrophorus terebratus
- Hygrophorus tessellatus
- Hygrophorus testaceus
- Hygrophorus tjibodensis
- Hygrophorus uliginosus
- Hygrophorus umbrinus
- Hygrophorus undulatus
- Hygrophorus unicolor
- Hygrophorus variabilis
- Hygrophorus variicolor
- Hygrophorus vaticanus
- Hygrophorus velatus
- Hygrophorus vernalis
- Hygrophorus vinicolor
- Hygrophorus virgatulus
- Hygrophorus viscidipes
- Hygrophorus viscosissimus
- Hygrophorus waikanaensis
- Hygrophorus westii
- Hygrophorus whitei
