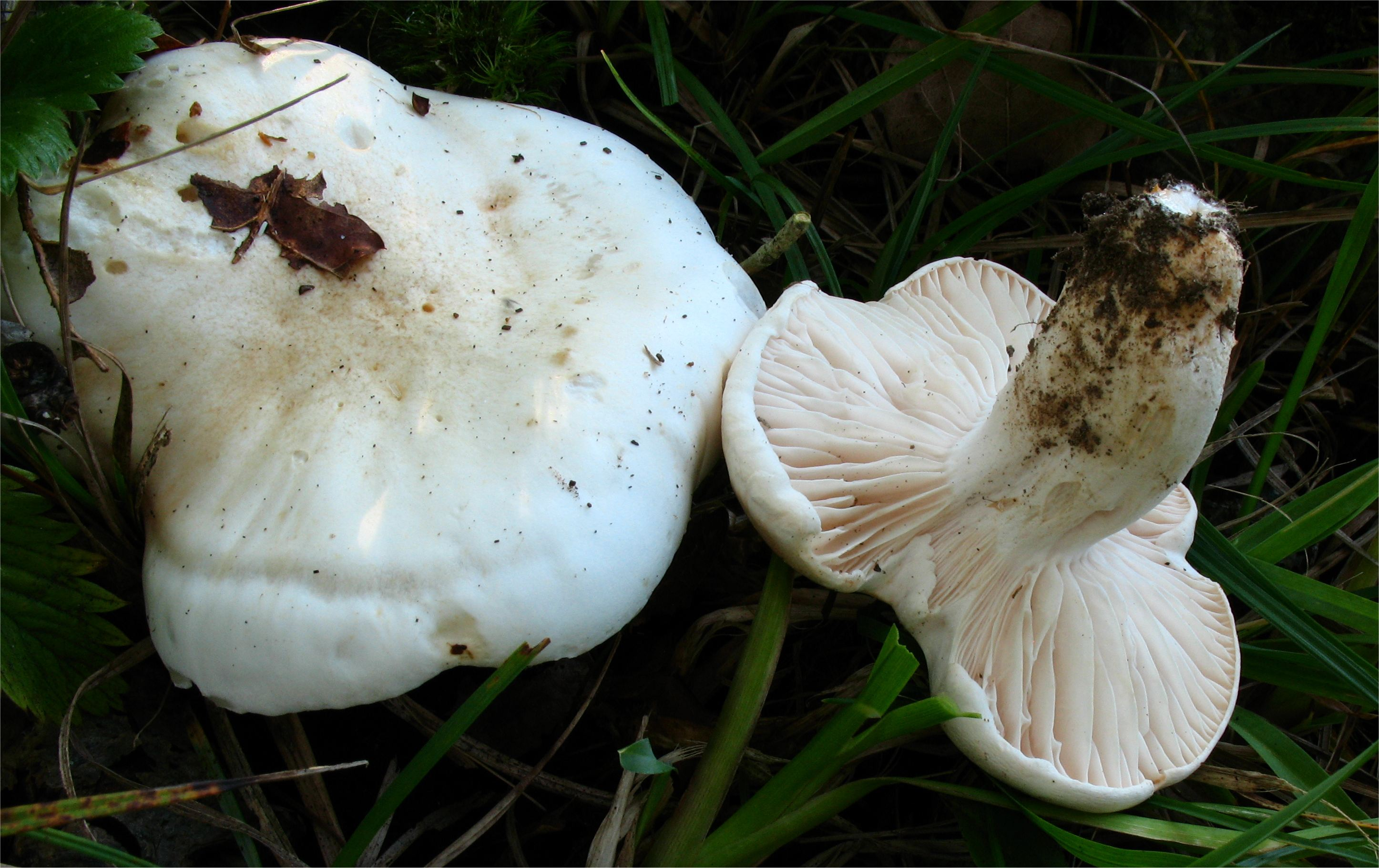

Scientific classification
- Domain: Eukaryota
- Kingdom: Fungi
- Division: Basidiomycota
- Class: Agaricomycetes
- Order: Agaricales
- Family: Hygrophoraceae
- Genus: Hygrophorus
- Species: H. penarioides

Binomial name
- Hygrophorus penarioides Jacobsson & E. Larss. (2007)

= Hygrophorus penarioides =

Species of fungus

Hygrophorus penarioides is a species of mushroom in the Hygrophoraceae. Found in Sweden, it grows in a mycorrhizal association with oak trees. It was formerly identified as Hygrophorus penarius, a similar species typically found in association with both beech and oak; analysis of internal transcribed spacer sequence data demonstrated that the species were different.

== See also ==
- List of Hygrophorus species
