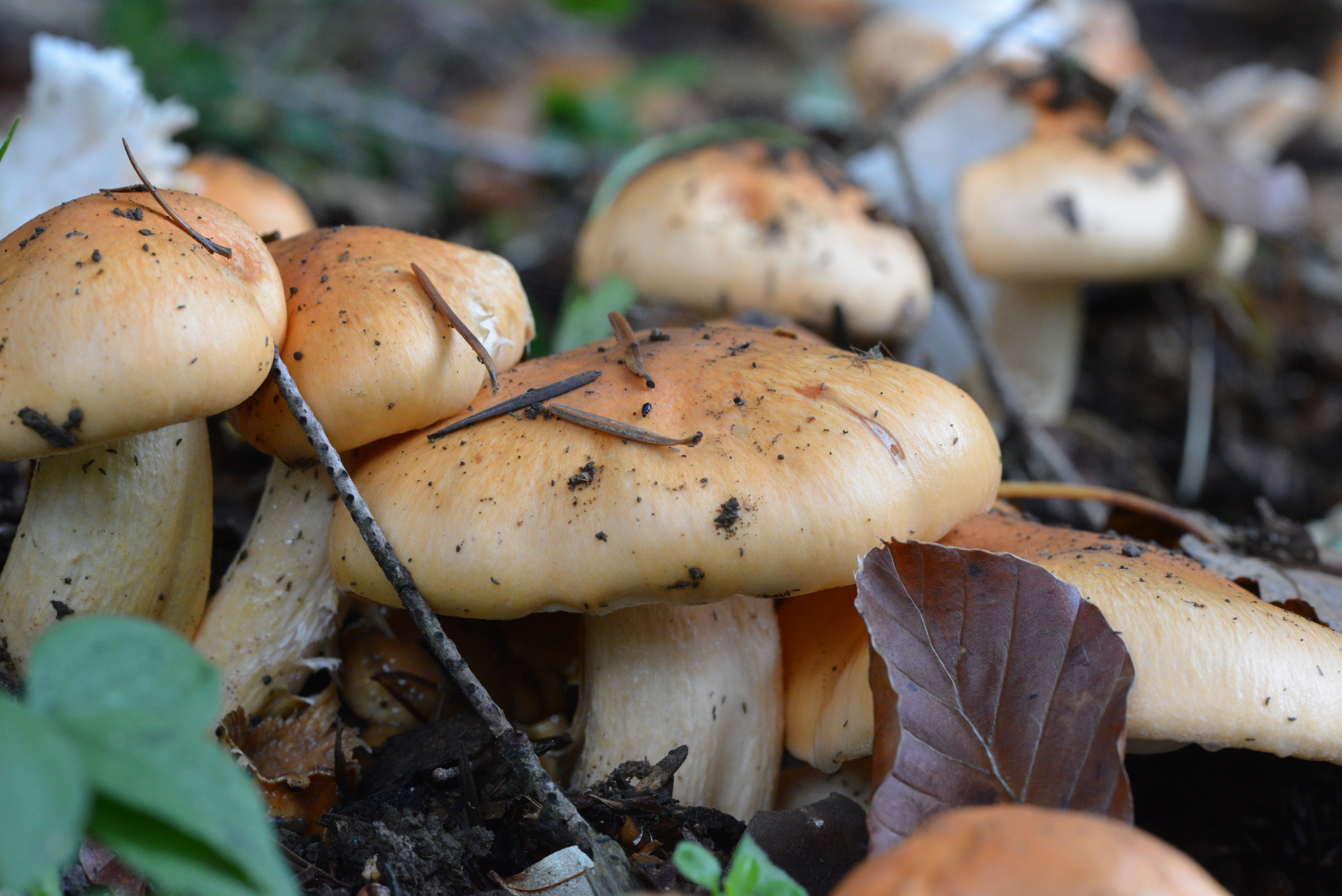

Scientific classification
- Kingdom: Fungi
- Division: Basidiomycota
- Class: Agaricomycetes
- Order: Agaricales
- Family: Hygrophoraceae
- Genus: Hygrophorus
- Species: H. pudorinus

Binomial name
- Hygrophorus pudorinus (Fr.) Fr. (1836)

Synonyms
- Agaricus pudorinus Fr.; Limacium eburneum var. pudorinum (Fr.) P.Kumm.

= Hygrophorus pudorinus =

Species of fungus

Hygrophorus pudorinus Mycological characteristics
- Gills on hymenium
- Cap is convex
- Hymenium is adnate or decurrent
- Stipe is bare
- Spore print is white
- Edibility is edible

Hygrophorus pudorinus, commonly known as the blushing waxycap, turpentine waxycap, or spruce waxy cap, is a species of fungus in the genus Hygrophorus.

== Taxonomy ==
Swedish mycologist Elias Magnus Fries described it as Agaricus pudorinus in his 1821 work Systema Mycologicum. It became Hygrophorus pudorinus with the raising of Hygrophorus to genus rank. The species name is the Latin word pudorinus "blushing".

The species is classified in the subsection Pudorini of genus Hygrophorus, along with the closely related species H. erubescens and H. purpurascens.

== Description ==
The pink to golden cap is 5–12 cm (2–4 3/4 in) wide, convex and with a downrolled margin that is lighter in colour. The cap surface is sticky. The pink to yellow-white gills are decurrent. The thick stipe is 4–16 cm (1 5/8–6 1/4 in) tall and 1–3 cm (3/8–1 1/8 in) wide. The spore print is white and the oval spores measure 7–10 × 5–6 micrometres. The thick flesh is pale pink or orange to white. The mushroom does not bruise red and has no distinctive odour, though it can taste like turpentine.

== Habitat and distribution ==
Hygrophorus pudorinus is found in coniferous woodlands under fir and spruce trees across western and northeastern North America; it is particularly common in Canada and the Rocky Mountains. The mushrooms appear in groups or fairy rings in late summer and autumn. They often grow in boggy places in sphagnum moss.

== Uses ==
Despite its taste, it is edible after cooking. Its variable appearance makes identification difficult and hence raises risk of misidentification.
