= Hygrophorus capreolarius =

Scientific classification
- Kingdom: Fungi
- Division: Basidiomycota
- Class: Agaricomycetes
- Order: Agaricales
- Family: Hygrophoraceae
- Genus: Hygrophorus
- Species: H. capreolarius

Binomial name
- Hygrophorus capreolarius (Kalchbr.) Sacc.

Synonyms
- Hygrophorus erubescens * capreolarius Kalchbr.

Species of fungus

Hygrophorus capreolarius is a species of mushroom in the family Hygrophoraceae.

== Taxonomy ==
Hygrophorus capreolarius was first described by Károly Kalchbrenner in 1874 as Hygrophorus erubescens * capreolarius. In 1887, Pier Andrea Saccardo changed its name to H. capreolarius.

== Description ==
The cap of Hygrophorus capreolarius is reddish to in color and about 3-8 centimeters in diameter. It starts out convex and becomes broadly convex to flat, sometimes with an uplifted margin. When young, it has an inrolled margin. It is slightly slimy when wet. The stipe is about 3-10 centimeters long and 6-10 millimeters wide. When young, it is whitish in color with a slight reddish tinge. As it matures, its color becomes more similar to the cap, with the top often lighter in color. The gills are reddish in color and adnate to subdecurrent. The spore print is whitish.

=== Similar species ===
Hygrophorus piceae is very similar to H. russula, but the latter is more pale, grows under hardwoods, and is larger. H. piceae is considered to be part of the H. russula group.

Hygrophorus capreolarius
- Mycological characteristics
- Gills on hymenium
- Cap is convex or flat
- Hymenium is adnate or subdecurrent
- Stipe is bare
- Spore print is white
- Ecology is mycorrhizal
- Edibility is edible

== Habitat and distribution ==
Hygrophorus piceae is mycorrhizal and grows under spruce, fir, and hemlock. It is found in Europe, the Pacific Northwest, the Northeastern United States, and the Great Lakes area. However, it is not known whether North American material is actually H. piceae or a different species.
