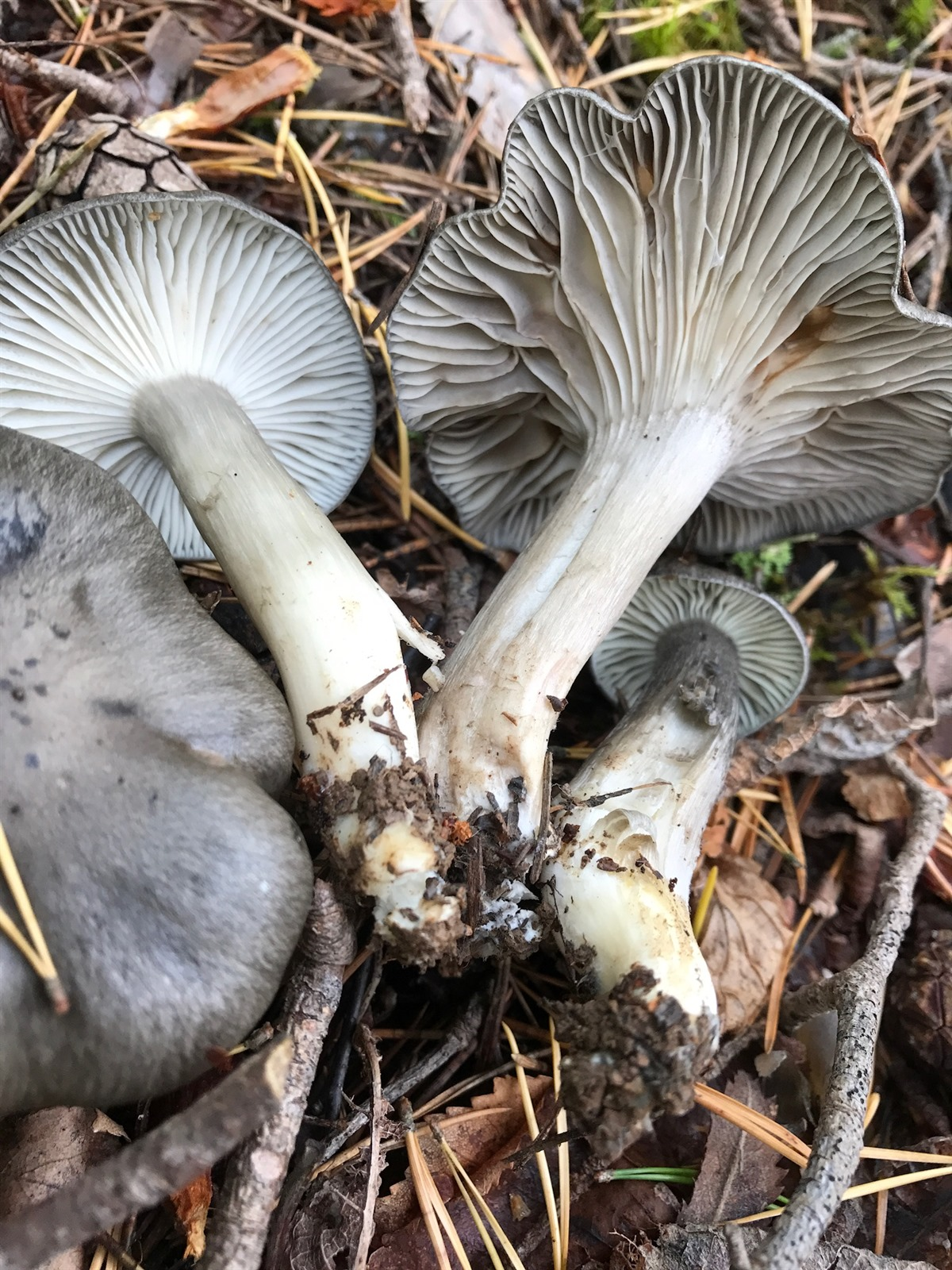

Scientific classification
- Domain: Eukaryota
- Kingdom: Fungi
- Division: Basidiomycota
- Class: Agaricomycetes
- Order: Agaricales
- Family: Hygrophoraceae
- Genus: Hygrophorus
- Species: H. atramentosus

Binomial name
- Hygrophorus atramentosus (Alb. & Schwein.) H. Haas & R. Haller Aar. ex Bon

= Hygrophorus atramentosus =

Species of fungus

Hygrophorus atramentosus, is a species of agaric fungus in the family Hygrophoraceae native to Europe.

== Habitat and morphology ==
Grows in summer and autumn in coniferous (mostly spruce), mixed forests with calcareous soils. It differs from other Hygrophorus sp., esp Hygrophorus camarophyllus, in its habitats - the latter grows in pine forests.

The cap is gray, with a metallic shade, 3.5–8 cm in diameter, irregular shape, prominently flat, concave surface. The stipe is 4–6 cm x 8–20 mm. Radially arranged lamellae are white or greyish. Mild smell. Spores 7–8.5 × 4.5-5.5 μm. The mushroom is not edible.
