= Wildlife of France =

The wildlife of France can be divided into that of Metropolitan France, and that of the French Overseas territories. For more information, see:

- Fauna of Metropolitan France
- Flora of Metropolitan France
- Fungi of Metropolitan France
- Wildlife of French Guiana
- Wildlife of French Polynesia
- Wildlife of Martinique
- Wildlife of Réunion
- Wildlife of Guadeloupe
- Wildlife of Mayotte

== See also ==
- Outline of France
- Glorioso Islands Marine Natural Park
- Gironde estuary and Pertuis sea Marine Nature Park
- Iroise Sea
- Mayotte Marine Natural Park
- Natural Park of the Coral Sea
