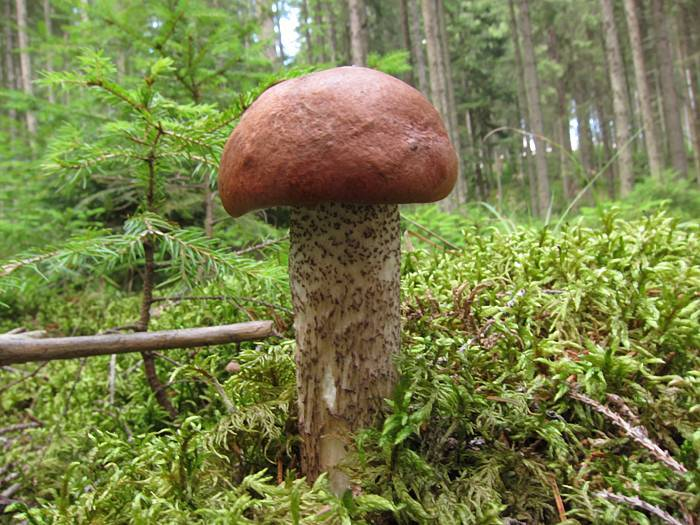

Scientific classification
- Kingdom: Fungi
- Division: Basidiomycota
- Class: Agaricomycetes
- Order: Boletales
- Family: Boletaceae
- Genus: Leccinum
- Species: L. vulpinum

Binomial name
- Leccinum vulpinum Watling (1961)

Synonyms
- Leccinum aurantiacum var. vulpinum (Watling) Pilát (1966); Krombholziella vulpina (Watling) Šutara (1982); Boletus vulpinus (Watling) Hlaváček (1990)

= Leccinum vulpinum =

Species of bolete fungus

Leccinum vulpinum, commonly known as the foxy bolete, is a species of edible mushroom-forming fungus found in Europe. It is characterized by its muted fox-red cap with cocoa-brown tints, cream-coloured pore surface, and stout stipe covered with scales that darken from whitish to dark brown with age. This bolete is distinguished from its close relatives by its consistent association with conifers (especially Scots pine), subdued brown-reddish cap lacking vivid yellow-orange tones, and relatively narrow spores. Originally described by Roy Watling in 1961 from Scotland, it has since been recorded across several European countries including Poland, Portugal, Macedonia, and Montenegro.

== Taxonomy ==
Leccinum vulpinum was erected by Roy Watling in his 1961 revision of British bolete species. It falls within the genus Leccinum, and is part of the Leccinum aurantiacum–Leccinum testaceoscabrum species complex. It is distinguished from its close relatives by its consistent association with conifers (especially Scots pine), its subdued brown‑reddish cap lacking any vivid yellow‑orange tones, and its relatively narrow spores.

== Description ==
The fruit bodies (basidiocarps) have a cap (pileus) measuring 30–90 mm in diameter. The cap is convex at first, later broadly convex, with a dry surface covered in fine, woolly fibrils that are darkest at the centre. Its colour is a muted fox‑red with a cocoa‑brown tint, maturing to a deeper burnt sienna; bruising may produce a purplish‑sienna hue. On the cap underside, the pore surface beneath is pale cream, with small, round pores that may faintly bruise lilac. The tubes are 3–11 mm long and are adnate (broadly attached) to scarcely free from the stipe.

The stipe is 85–135 mm long and 13–22 mm wide (up to 28 mm at the base), stout and stuffed. It is pallid overall, slightly swollen towards the base, and bears fine scales that change from whitish to reddish‑brown and finally to dark brown or chocolate. The stipe base often bruises blue‑green.

Flesh throughout is white and may remain unchanging in the cap; when it does stain, changes are very slow—first to a pale pink or wine tint in the stipe apex, then to a blue‑green in the cortex at the base, and ultimately to a patchy steel‑blue. The odour is mild and pleasant, and the taste is gentle and not distinctive.

Microscopic features include spindle‑shaped (subfusiform) smooth spores, about 12–16.5 by 3–4 μm (brown in mass), four‑spored basidia 16.5–20 by 8–10 μm, and ventricose to fusiform cystidia measuring 30–35 by 10–13.5 μm (with a 2–3 μm‑wide neck).

== Habitat and distribution ==
Leccinum vulpinum is mycorrhizal with Scots pine (Pinus sylvestris). It was originally recorded from dry, upland pine woods in Inverness-shire, Scotland. Specimens were found among bilberry (Vaccinium myrtillus) beneath mature pines in the Rothiemurchus area and Cairngorms National Park, with known collections dating from 1957 to 1960. An edible species, it grows in mycorrhizal association with species of pine and bearberry. The fungus is known to have a broader European distribution and has been recorded from several additional countries, including Poland, Portugal, Macedonia, and Montenegro.

== See also ==
- List of Leccinum species
