= Hygrophorus fuscoalboides =

Scientific classification
- Kingdom: Fungi
- Division: Basidiomycota
- Class: Agaricomycetes
- Order: Agaricales
- Family: Hygrophoraceae
- Genus: Hygrophorus
- Species: H. fuscoalboides

Binomial name
- Hygrophorus fuscoalboides Hesler & A.H. Sm.

Species of fungus

Hygrophorus fuscoalboides, commonly known as sheathed waxy cap, is a species of mushroom in the family Hygrophoraceae. It is found in forests.

== Description ==
The cap of Hygrophorus fuscoalboides is brownish to gray and about 3-10 centimeters in diameter. It starts out round or conical and becomes broadly convex, flat, or umbonate with age. It is slimy. The stipe is fibrillose. It is grayish near the base and whitish at the top. It is also slimy when young. It ranges from about 3.5-5 centimeters long and 8-10 millimeters wide. The gills are white in color and adnate to subdecurrent. The spore print is white.

== Habitat and distribution ==
Hygrophorus fuscoalboides
- Mycological characteristics
- Gills on hymenium
- Cap is convex or umbonate
- Hymenium is adnate or subdecurrent
- Stipe is bare
- Spore print is white
- Ecology is mycorrhizal
- Edibility is edible

Hygrophorus fuscoalboides is found in the Pacific Northwest and Idaho. It is rare in the Pacific Northwest and grows under spruce and other conifers.
