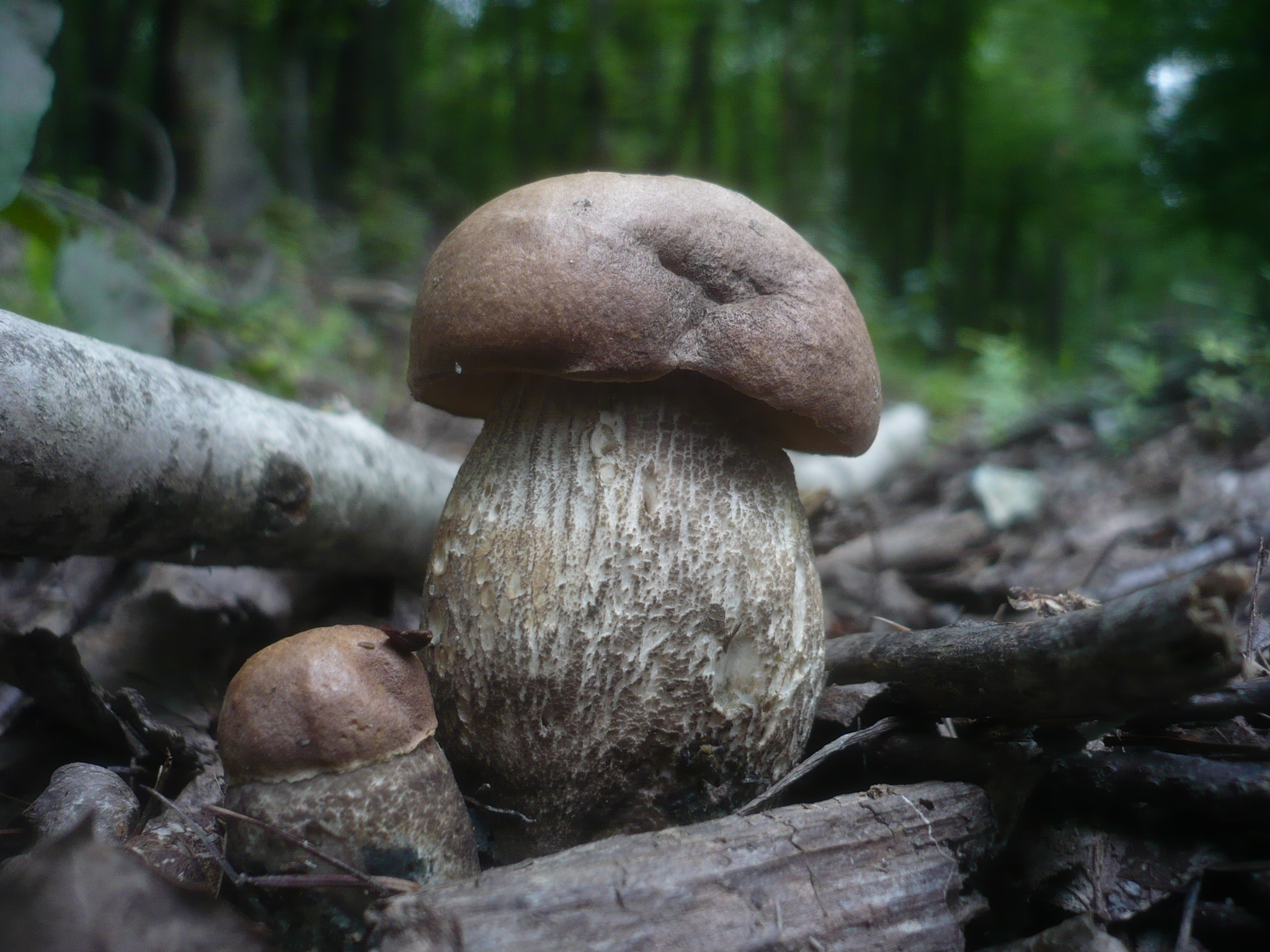

Scientific classification
- Domain: Eukaryota
- Kingdom: Fungi
- Division: Basidiomycota
- Class: Agaricomycetes
- Order: Boletales
- Family: Boletaceae
- Genus: Leccinum
- Species: L. duriusculum

Binomial name
- Leccinum duriusculum (Schulzer ex Kalchbr.) Singer (1947)

Synonyms
- Boletus duriusculus Schulzer (1874); Leccinum aurantiacum subsp. duriusculum (Schulzer ex Kalchbr.) Hlaváček (1958); Krombholzia aurantiaca f. duruiscula (Schulzer ex Kalchbr.) Vassilkov (1956); Krombholzia aurantiaca subsp. duriuscula (Schulzer) Maire (1933); Krombholzia aurantiaca f. duriuscula (Schulzer ex Kalchbr.) Vassilkov (1956)

= Leccinum duriusculum =

Species of fungus

Leccinum duriusculum Mycological characteristics
- Pores on hymenium
- Cap is convex
- Hymenium is adnate
- Stipe is bare
- Ecology is mycorrhizal
- Edibility is edible

Leccinum duriusculum is a bolete mushroom in the genus Leccinum. Originally called Boletus duriusculus by Hungarian–Croatian mycologist Stephan Schulzer von Müggenburg in 1874, it was transferred to Leccinum by Rolf Singer in 1947.

== See also ==
- List of Leccinum species
