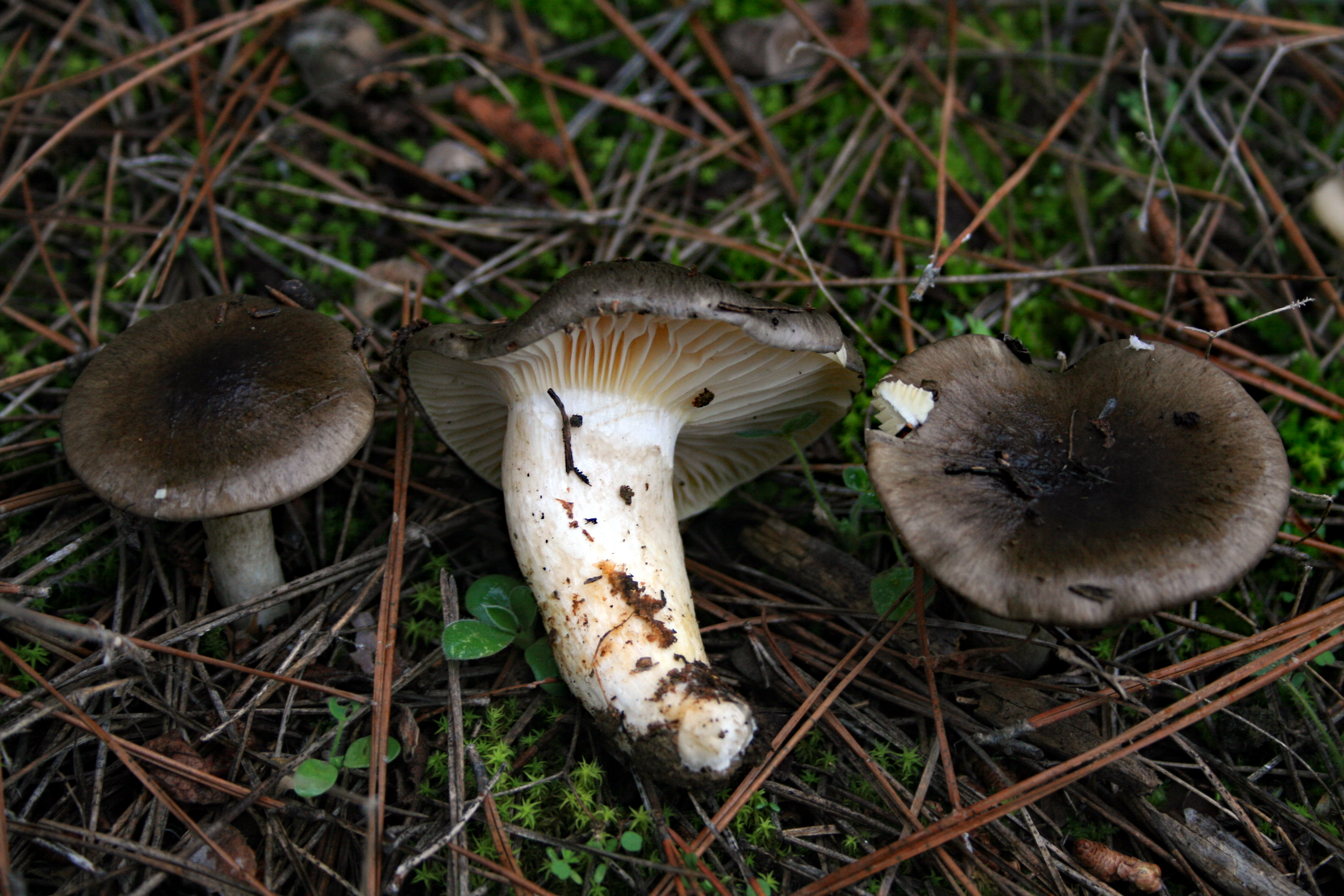

Scientific classification
- Domain: Eukaryota
- Kingdom: Fungi
- Division: Basidiomycota
- Class: Agaricomycetes
- Order: Agaricales
- Family: Hygrophoraceae
- Genus: Hygrophorus
- Species: H. meridionalis

Binomial name
- Hygrophorus meridionalis Loizides, P.-A. Moreau, Athanassiou & Athanasiades (2018)

= Hygrophorus meridionalis =

Species of fungus

Hygrophorus meridionalis is a species of basidiomycete fungus in the family Hygrophoraceae. Described as new to science in 2018, this waxcap is found in abundance on the island of Cyprus and southern Greece, where it grows in association with Pinus brutia and Pinus halepensis on calcareous substrates.
