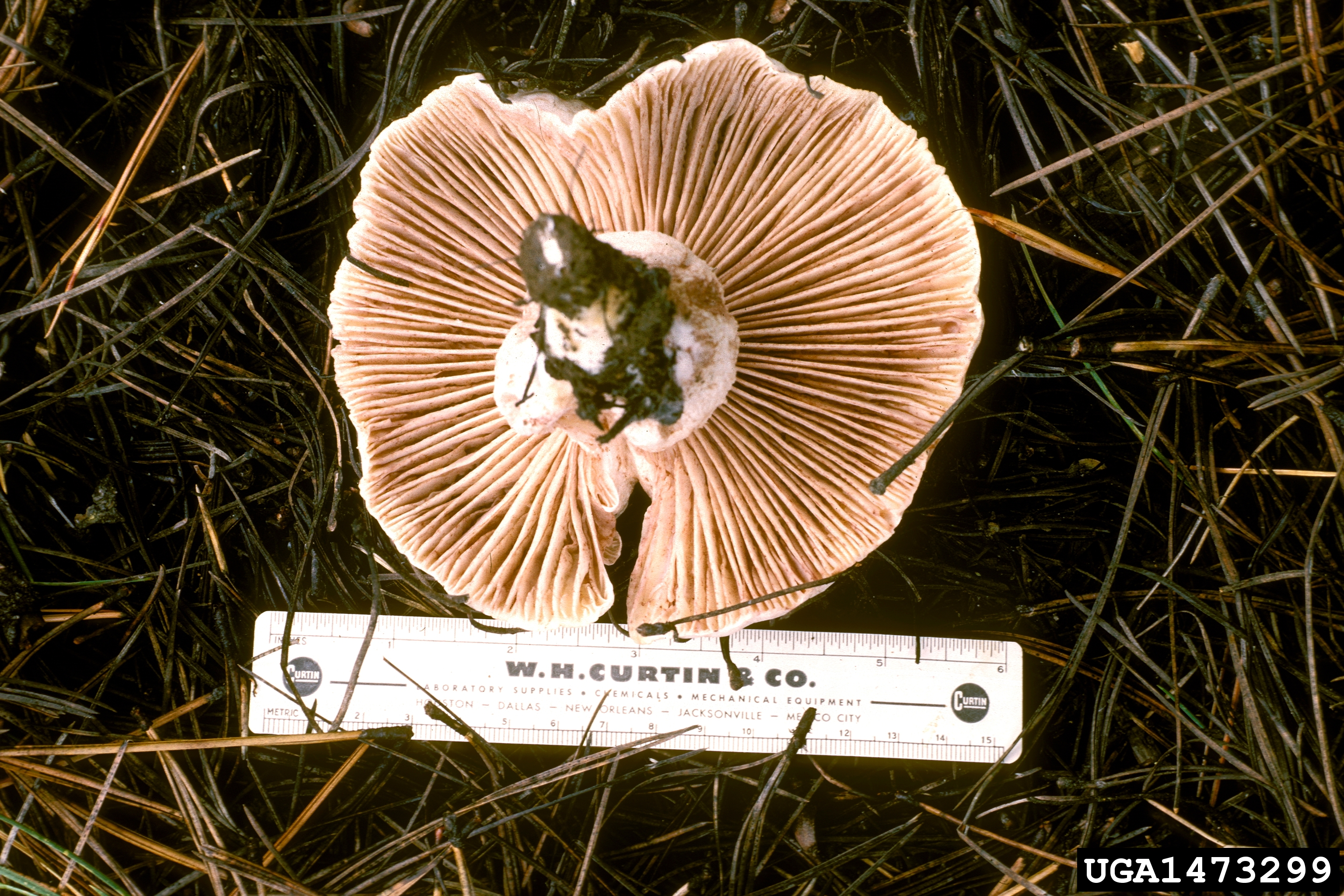

Scientific classification
- Kingdom: Fungi
- Division: Basidiomycota
- Class: Agaricomycetes
- Order: Agaricales
- Family: Hygrophoraceae
- Genus: Hygrophorus
- Species: H. purpurascens

Binomial name
- Hygrophorus purpurascens (Alb. & Schwein.) Fr. (1838)

Synonyms
- Agaricus purpurascens Alb. & Schwein. (1805); Limacium purpurascens (Alb. & Schwein.) P.Kumm. (1871)

= Hygrophorus purpurascens =

Species of fungus

Hygrophorus purpurascens, commonly known as the purple waxy cap or purple-red waxy cap, is a species of agaric fungus in the family Hygrophoraceae. Its cap has a pink background color with streaks of purplish red overlaid, and mature gills have red spots.

== Taxonomy ==
The species was originally described as Agaricus purpurascens by Johannes Baptista von Albertini and Lewis David de Schweinitz in 1805. Elias Fries transferred it to the genus Hygrophorus in 1838. Paul Kummer's 1871 Limacium purpurascens is a synonym. The specific epithet purpurascens means "becoming purple". It is commonly known as the "veiled purple hygrophorus".

== Description ==
The cap is convex to flattened, measuring 6–15 cm (2.4–5.9 in) in diameter. The color is pinkish red in the center to white, often irregularly tinged with pink. The flesh is white. The gills have a decurrent attachment to the stipe and are white to pale pink spotted with pinkish or purplish red. The stipe measures 3–10 cm (1.2–3.9 in) long by 1–2.4 cm (0.4–0.9 in) wide, and is more or less the same color as the cap, often spotted with dark red.

The spore print is white. The spores are thin-walled, elliptical, smooth, and measure 5.5–8 by 3–4.5 μm. The basidia (spore-bearing cells) are narrowly club-shaped, thin-walled, four-spored, and measure 40–56 by 5–8 μm.

=== Similar species ===
Amongst other potential lookalikes in the genus, H. russula can be distinguished by its tendency to bruise yellow and its association with hardwood trees.

== Habitat and distribution ==
The fruit bodies of H. purpurascens grow on the ground in clusters or groups under conifer trees. A snowbank mushroom, it is commonly found fruiting near the edges of snowbanks, or shortly after snowmelt.

Hygrophorus purpurascens
- Mycological characteristics
- Gills on hymenium
- Cap is convex or flat
- Hymenium is adnate or decurrent
- Stipe is bare
- Spore print is white
- Ecology is mycorrhizal
- Edibility is edible, but unpalatable

== Uses ==
The fruit bodies are edible but may be bitter.

== See also ==
- List of Hygrophorus species
