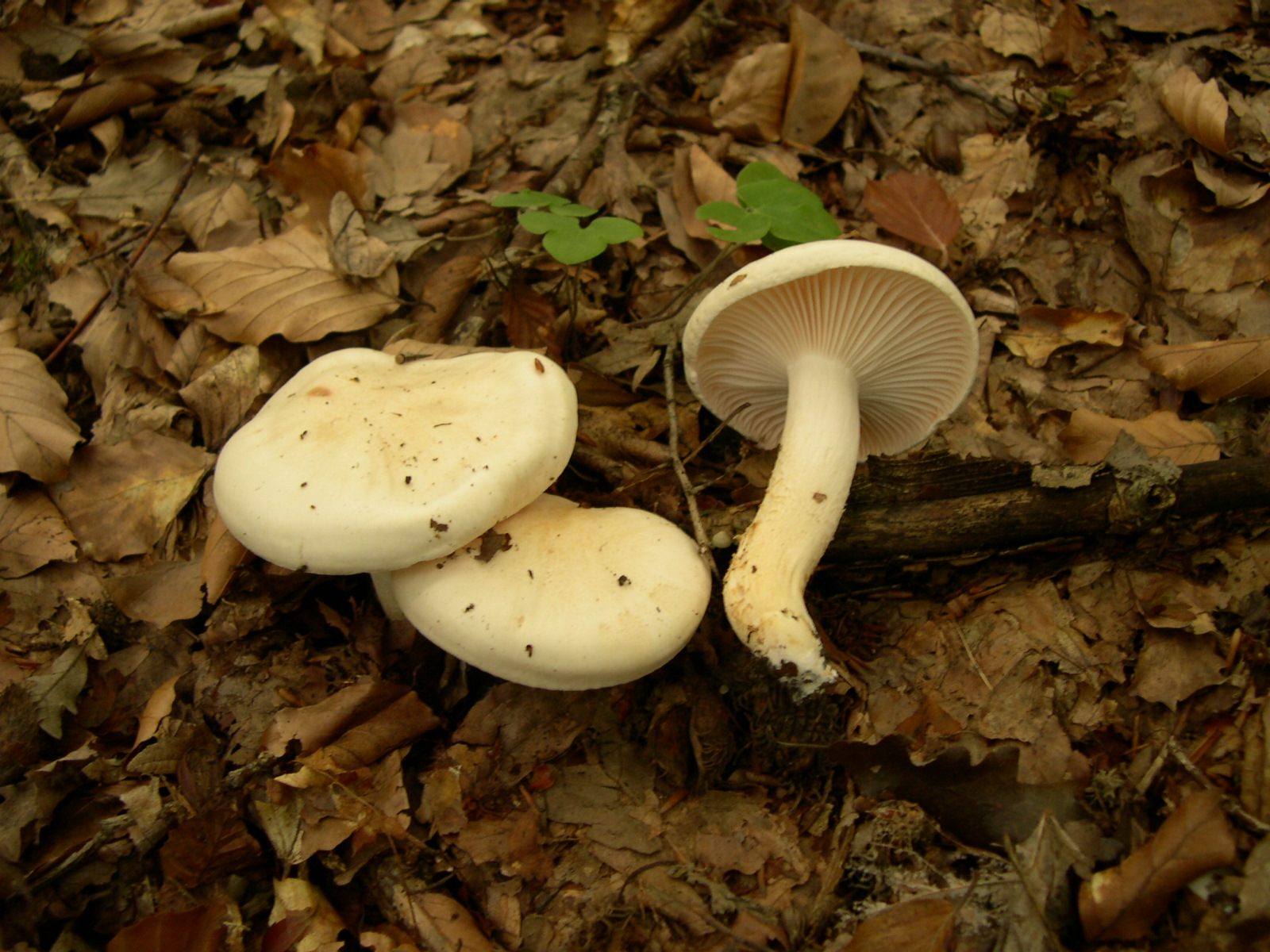

Scientific classification
- Domain: Eukaryota
- Kingdom: Fungi
- Division: Basidiomycota
- Class: Agaricomycetes
- Order: Agaricales
- Family: Hygrophoraceae
- Genus: Hygrophorus
- Species: H. penarius

Binomial name
- Hygrophorus penarius Fr.

= Hygrophorus penarius =

Species of fungus

Hygrophorus penarius is a species of fungus belonging to the family Hygrophoraceae.

It is native to Europe, Northern America, and Japan.
