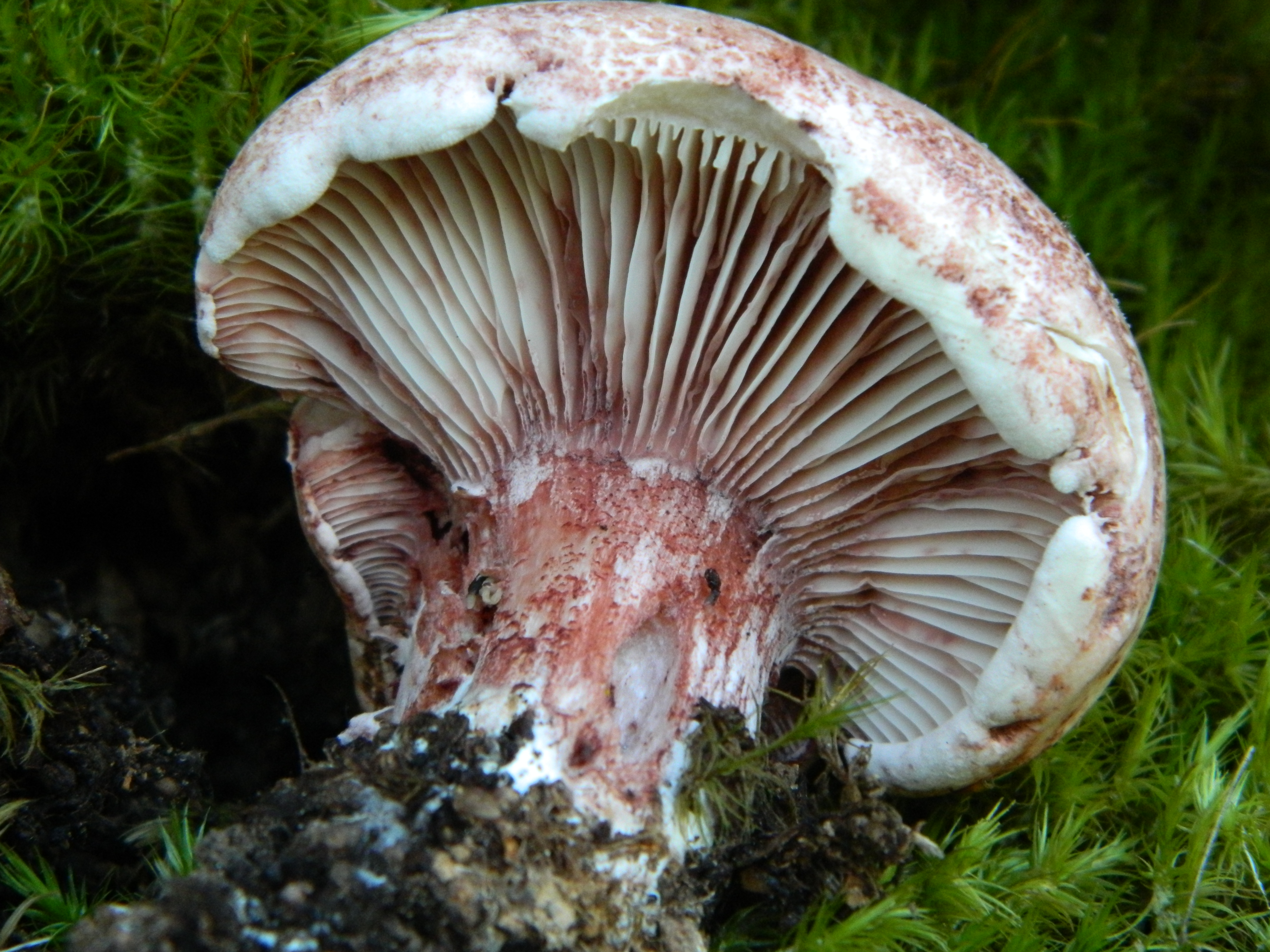

Scientific classification
- Kingdom: Fungi
- Division: Basidiomycota
- Class: Agaricomycetes
- Order: Agaricales
- Family: Hygrophoraceae
- Genus: Hygrophorus
- Species: H. russula

Binomial name
- Hygrophorus russula (Schaeff.) Kauffman (1918)

Synonyms
- Agaricus russula Schaeff. (1774)

= Hygrophorus russula =

Species of fungus

Hygrophorus russula
- Mycological characteristics
- Gills on hymenium
- Cap is convex
- Hymenium is adnate or decurrent
- Stipe is bare
- Spore print is white
- Edibility is choice or edible

Hygrophorus russula, commonly known as the pinkmottle woodwax, false russula, or russula-like waxy cap, is a species of fungus native to the Northern Hemisphere.

== Taxonomy ==
German naturalist Jacob Christian Schäffer described the species as Agaricus russula in 1774. The species name is derived from its reddish coloration, reminiscent of members of the genus Russula. French botanist Claude Casimir Gillet placed it in the genus Tricholoma in 1878, before American naturalist Calvin Henry Kauffman transferred it to Hygrophorus in 1918. Though Kauffman thought it resembled Tricholoma, he held that its waxy gills showed it to be better suited to the genus Hygrophorus.

== Description ==
The cap is hemispherical before flattening out with age, though the cap margin remains inrolled. Reaching 5–12 cm (2–4 3/4 in) in diameter, it has a base colour of white or pink with streaks of pink, wine-red or purple. The cap surface is sticky when young. The firm flesh is pink or white and has a mild scent and flavour. The crowded gills are decurrent. White when young, they become discoloured with pink and wine-red stains. The stipe is 2–10 cm (3/4–4 in) high and 1.5–3.5 cm (1/2–1 1/2 in) wide. The spore print is white, the smooth oval spores measuring 6–8 by 3–5 μm under the microscope.

=== Similar species ===
It can be distinguished from russulas by its non-brittle stipe. The edible but poor Hygrophorus purpurascens is similar but has a veil and grows under conifers.

== Distribution and habitat ==
It is native to Europe, Russia, North America, Japan and Korea. In eastern North America, it appears under oak from August to October, later on the West Coast. It is more common in the east of the continent than the west. The fruit bodies, or mushrooms, can be abundant some years, especially after rainfall, sometimes appearing in arcs or fairy rings.

== Uses ==
The mushroom is edible but sources differ as to its quality.

== See also ==
- List of Hygrophorus species
