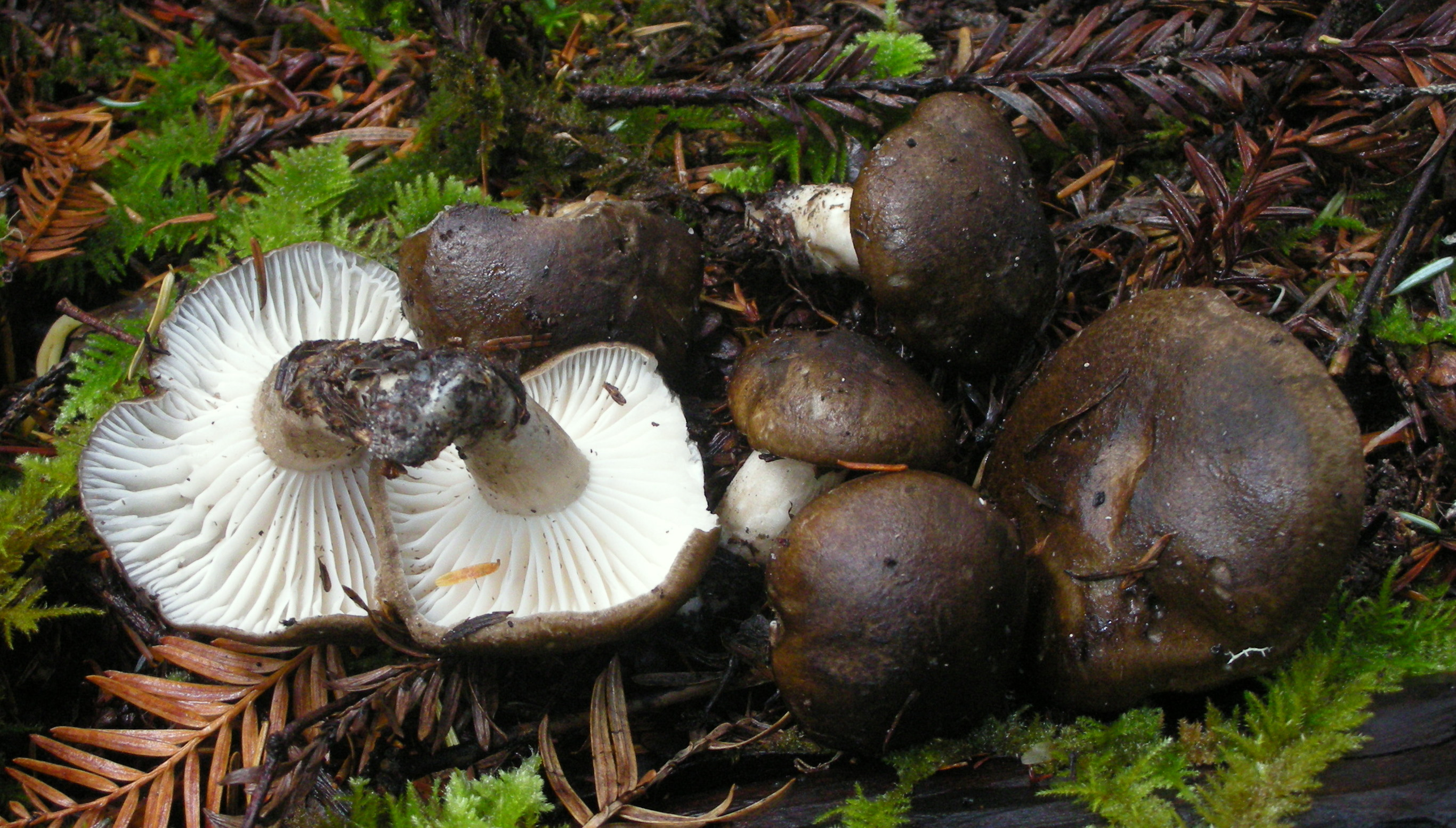

Scientific classification
- Kingdom: Fungi
- Division: Basidiomycota
- Class: Agaricomycetes
- Order: Agaricales
- Family: Hygrophoraceae
- Genus: Hygrophorus
- Species: H. camarophyllus

Binomial name
- Hygrophorus camarophyllus (Alb. & Schwein.) Dumée

= Hygrophorus camarophyllus =

Species of fungus

Hygrophorus camarophyllus, commonly known as the arched woodwax, smoky waxy cap, or sooty brown waxy cap, is a species of edible fungus in the genus Hygrophorus.

== Description ==
The cap of Hygrophorus camarophyllus is grayish to brownish and about 3-10 centimeters in diameter. It starts out round, umbonate, or convex with an inrolled margin. Then, it becomes flat or broadly convex. The stipe is about 2-10 centimeters long and 1-3 centimeters wide and is grayish or beige in color. The gills are adnate or slightly decurrent and whitish in color. The spore print is white.

== Habitat and ecology ==
Hygrophorus camarophyllus
- Mycological characteristics
- Gills on hymenium
- Cap is convex or flat
- Hymenium is adnate or decurrent
- Stipe is bare
- Spore print is white
- Ecology is mycorrhizal
- Edibility is edible

Hygrophorous camarophyllus is found in coniferous forests, where it grows under pine, spruce, and hemlock. It is found in the Northern Hemisphere.
