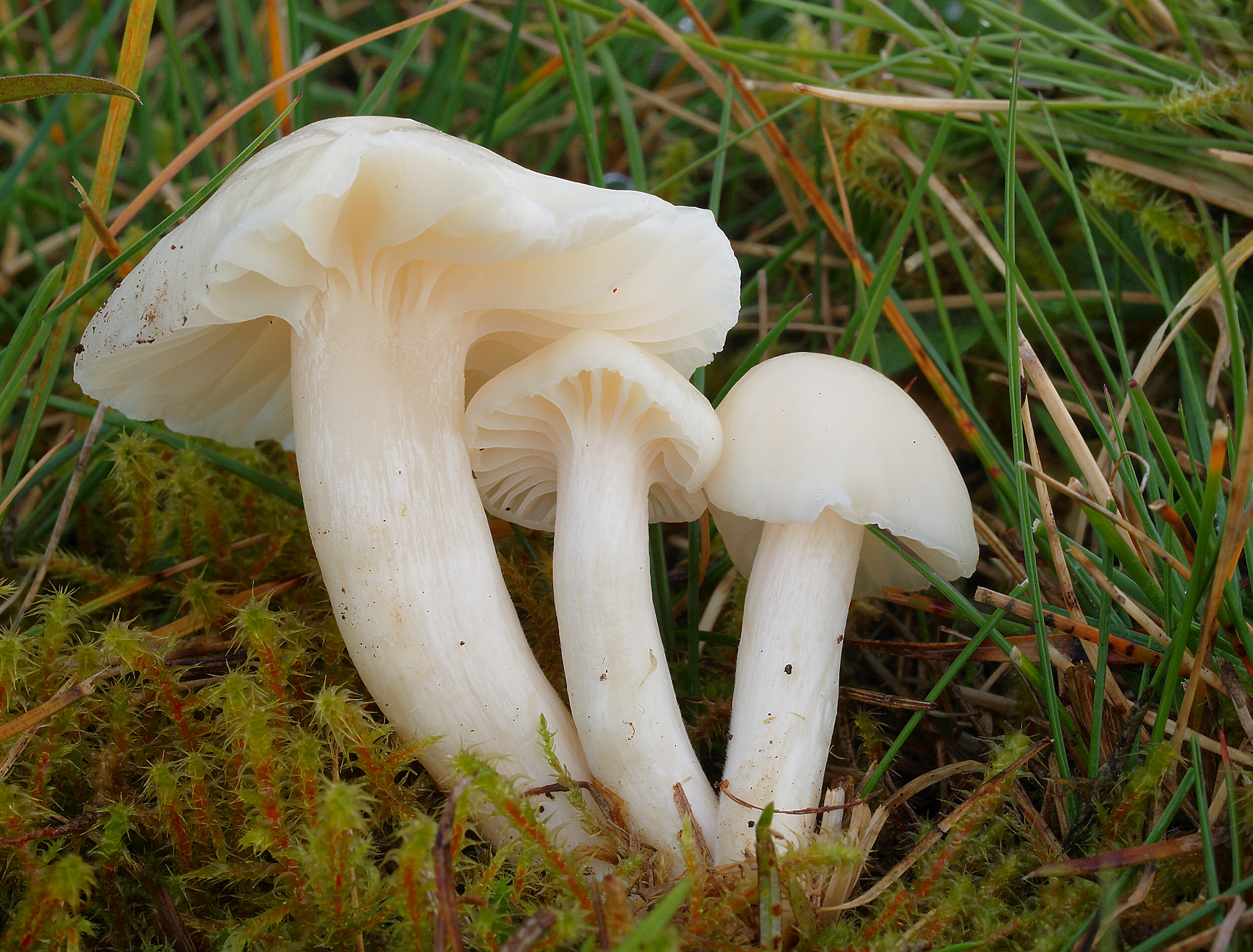

Scientific classification
- Kingdom: Fungi
- Division: Basidiomycota
- Class: Agaricomycetes
- Order: Agaricales
- Family: Hygrophoraceae
- Genus: Cuphophyllus
- Species: C. virgineus

Binomial name
- Cuphophyllus virgineus (Wulfen) Kovalenko (1989)

Synonyms
- Agaricus niveus Scop. (1772); Agaricus virgineus Wulfen (1781); Hygrophorus niveus (Scop.) Fr.) (1838); Hygrophorus virgineus (Wulfen) Fr.) (1838); Camarophyllus virgineus (Wulfen) P.Kumm. (1871); Camarophyllus virginea (Giovanni Antonio Scopoli; Hygrocybe nivea (Scop.) Murrill (1916); Hygrocybe virginea (Wulfen) P.D.Orton & Watling (1969); Cuphophyllus niveus (Scop.) Bon (1984)

= Cuphophyllus virgineus =

Species of fungus

Cuphophyllus virgineus is a species of agaric (gilled mushroom) in the family Hygrophoraceae. Its recommended English common name is snowy waxcap in the UK. The species has a largely north temperate distribution, occurring in grassland in Europe and in woodland in northern Asia and North America. It typically produces basidiocarps (fruit bodies) in the autumn.

== Taxonomy ==
The species was first described in 1781 by the Austrian mycologist Franz Xaver von Wulfen as Agaricus virgineus. It was subsequently combined in a number of different genera, being transferred to Hygrocybe in 1969 before being transferred to Cuphophyllus. The specific epithet comes from Latin "virgineus" (= pure white). Hygrocybe nivea, first described by the Italian mycologist and naturalist Giovanni Antonio Scopoli in 1772, was sometimes distinguished by producing smaller and more slender fruit bodies than H. virginea, but is now regarded as a synonym.

Molecular research published in 2011, based on cladistic analysis of DNA sequences found that Hygrocybe virginea does not belong in Hygrocybe sensu stricto and belongs in the genus Cuphophyllus instead.

== Description ==
Basidiocarps are agaricoid. The cap is convex at first, becoming flat or slightly depressed when expanded, up to 7.5 centimetres (3 in) across. The cap surface is smooth, waxy when damp, hygrophanous and somewhat translucent with a striate margin, white to ivory (rarely with ochre to brownish tints). The lamellae (gills) are waxy, cap-coloured, and decurrent (widely attached to and running down the stipe). The stipe (stem) is up to 7 cm long, smooth, cylindrical or tapering to the base, cap-coloured, and waxy when damp. The flesh is white with a mild smell and bitter to acrid flavor. The spore print is white, the spores (under a microscope) smooth, inamyloid, ellipsoid, about 7.0 to 8.5 by 4.5 to 5.0 μm.

The species is sometimes parasitized by the mould Marquandomyces marquandi, which colours the lamellae violet.

=== Similar species ===
Cuphophyllus russocoriaceus is very similar in appearance, but can be distinguished in the field by its strong smell of sandalwood. C. berkeleyi (sometimes considered a white form of C. pratensis) is also similar, but its fruit bodies are typically larger and non-hygrophanous. C. angustifolius is stockier.

== Distribution and habitat ==
The snowy waxcap is widespread throughout the north temperate zone, occurring in Europe, northern Asia, North America, and Australia. Like other waxcaps, it grows in old, unimproved, short-sward grassland (pastures and lawns) in Europe, but in woodland elsewhere. Recent research suggests waxcaps are neither mycorrhizal nor saprotrophic, but may be associated with mosses.

== Conservation ==
In Europe, Cuphophyllus virgineus is typical of waxcap grasslands, a declining habitat due to changing agricultural practices. Cuphophyllus virgineus is one of the commonest species in the genus and is not considered to be of conservation concern (unlike most other waxcaps). In 1997, the species was featured on a postage stamp issued by the Faeroe Islands.

== Edibility ==
The fruit bodies are considered edible and good.
