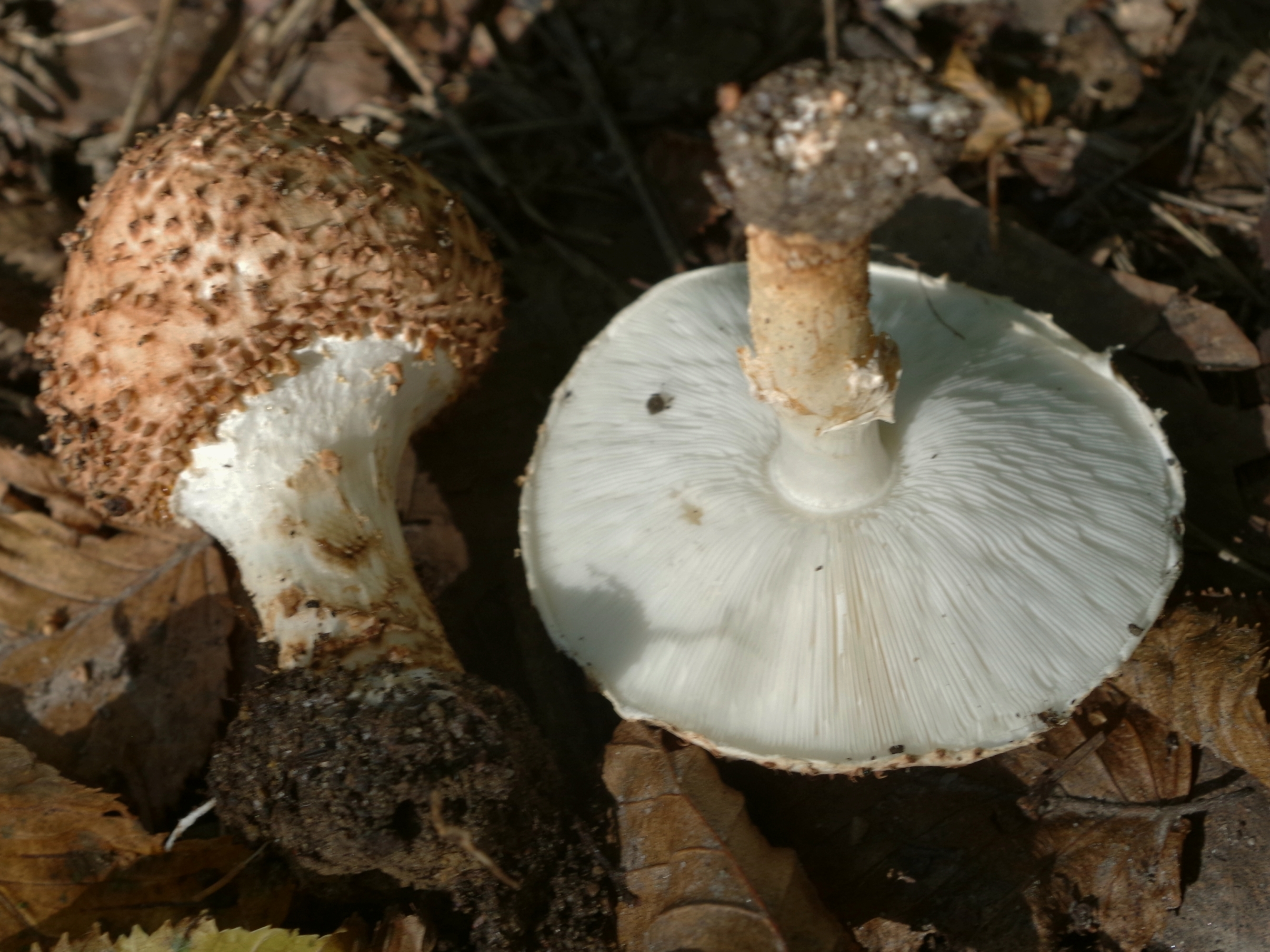
- Echinoderma asperum

Scientific classification
- Kingdom: Fungi
- Division: Basidiomycota
- Class: Agaricomycetes
- Order: Agaricales
- Family: Agaricaceae
- Genus: Echinoderma (Locq. ex Bon) Bon (1991)

Type species
- Echinoderma asperum (Pers.) Bon (1991)

Synonyms
- Cystolepiota subgen. Echinoderma Locq. ex Bon (1981)

= Echinoderma =

Genus of fungi

Echinoderma is a genus of fungi in the family Agaricaceae. Its members were for a long time considered to belong to genus Lepiota and the group was then circumscribed by French mycologist Marcel Bon in 1981 as a subgenus of Cystolepiota before he raised it to generic status in 1991.

== General info ==
This genus belongs to a group of genera allied to Lepiota with a white spore print, free (or almost free) gills, stipe easily separable from the cap and having a partial veil. Amongst the Agaricaceae it is characterized by the white spore powder, cap skin microscopically an epithelium with rounded cells, and a brownish cap and stipe, with brown scales.

The name comes from the Greek "echinos" (ἐχῖνος) meaning a hedgehog or sea-urchin and "derma" (δέρμα) meaning skin, referring to the spiny cap surface. The noun "derma" is neuter and therefore if the species name is an adjective, it needs to take the neuter ending (example: Echinoderma asperum).

== Species ==
- Echinoderma asperum (Pers.) Bon 1991
- Echinoderma boertmannii (Knudsen) Bon 1991
- Echinoderma bonii C.E.Hermos. & Jul.Sánchez 1999
- Echinoderma calcicola (Knudsen) Bon 1991
- Echinoderma carinii (Bres.) Bon 1991
- Echinoderma echinaceum (J.E.Lange) Bon 1991
- Echinoderma efibulis (Knudsen) Bon 1991
- Echinoderma hystrix (F.H.Møller & J.E.Lange) Bon 1991
- Echinoderma jacobi (Vellinga & Knudsen) Gminder 2003
- Echinoderma perplexum (Knudsen) Bon 1991
- Echinoderma pseudoasperulum (Knudsen) Bon 1991
- Echinoderma rubellum (Bres.) Migl. 2000

== See also ==
- List of Agaricaceae genera
- List of Agaricales genera
- A Guide to the Shell and Starfish Galleries: (Mollusca, Polyzoa, Brachiopoda, Tunicata, Echinoderma, and Worms) (1901), British Museum (Natural History). Department of Zoology et al.
