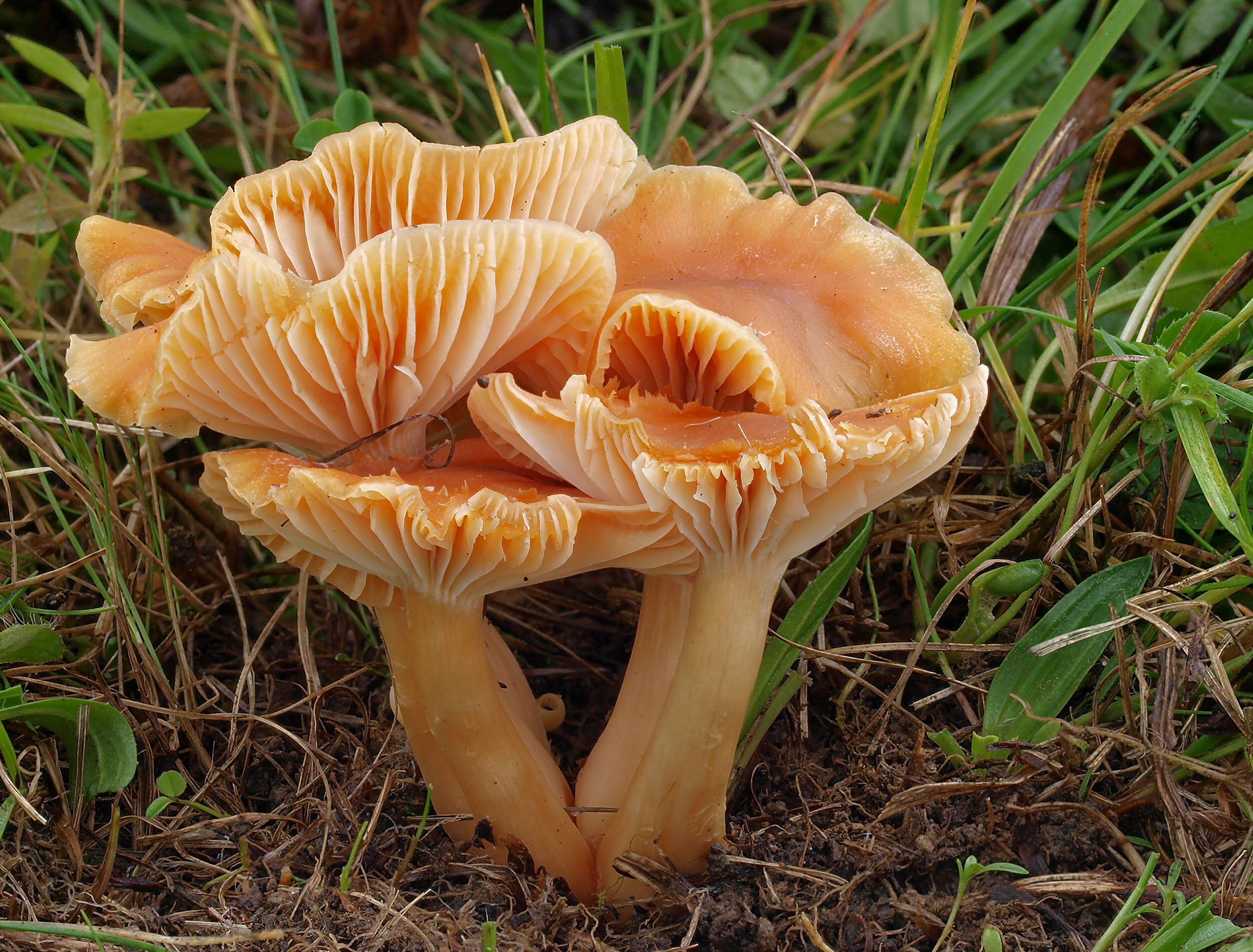

Scientific classification
- Kingdom: Fungi
- Division: Basidiomycota
- Class: Agaricomycetes
- Order: Agaricales
- Family: Hygrophoraceae
- Genus: Cuphophyllus
- Species: C. pratensis

Binomial name
- Cuphophyllus pratensis (Schaeff.) Bon (1985)

Synonyms
- Agaricus pratensis Schaeff. (1774); Hygrophorus pratensis (Schaeff.) Fr.) (1836); Camarophyllus pratensis (Schaeff.) P.Kumm. (1871); Hygrophorus karstenii Sacc. & Cub. (1887); Hygrocybe pratensis (Schaeff.) Murrill (1914)

= Cuphophyllus pratensis =

Species of fungus

Cuphophyllus pratensis
- Mycological characteristics
- Gills on hymenium
- Cap is umbonate or depressed
- Hymenium is decurrent
- Stipe is bare
- Spore print is white
- Ecology is mycorrhizal
- Edibility is choice or edible

Cuphophyllus pratensis is a species of agaric (gilled mushroom) in the family Hygrophoraceae. It has been given the recommended English name of meadow waxcap in the UK and in North America has variously been called the meadow waxy cap, salmon waxy cap, and butter meadowcap.

The species has a widespread, mainly temperate distribution, occurring in grassland in Europe and in woodland elsewhere. The basidiocarps (fruit bodies) are edible and are occasionally collected and sold commercially.

== Taxonomy ==
The species was first described in 1774 by the German mycologist and naturalist Jacob Christian Schäffer as Agaricus pratensis. It was subsequently combined in a number of different genera, before being transferred to Hygrocybe in 1914. The specific epithet comes from Latin "pratensis" (= growing in meadows). Molecular research, based on cladistic analysis of DNA sequences, has found that Hygrocybe pratensis does not belong in Hygrocybe sensu stricto but to the genus Cuphophyllus.

== Description ==
The basidiocarps are agaricoid. The cap is convex at first, becoming flat, umbonate, or slightly depressed when expanded, up to 6 centimetres (2 1/4 in) across. The cap surface is smooth and dry, pale salmon to orange-buff. The lamellae (gills) are waxy, pale, and decurrent (widely attached to and running down the stipe). The stipe (stem) is up to 7 cm (2 3/4 in) long, smooth, cylindrical or tapering to the base, and creamy in colour. The flesh is whitish with a mild smell and taste (sometimes unpleasant). The spore print is white, the spores (under a microscope) smooth, inamyloid, ellipsoid, about 5.5 to 6.5 by 4.0 to 5.0 μm.

=== Similar species ===
Cuphophyllus berkeleyi is very similar, but fruit bodies are white (sometimes being considered a variety of C. pratensis). The placeholder species C. graveolens is similar, as is C. colemannianus. Hygrophorus nemoreus is an ectomycorrhizal species, growing in woodland with oaks, and has a distinctly mealy smell. There is also H. pudorinus.

== Distribution and habitat ==
The meadow waxcap has a widespread distribution, mainly occurring in temperate zones. It has been recorded in Europe, North Africa, North and South America, northern Asia, Australia, and New Zealand. Like other waxcaps, it grows in old, unimproved, short-sward grassland (pastures and lawns) in Europe, but in woodland elsewhere. Recent research suggests waxcaps are neither mycorrhizal nor saprotrophic but may be associated with mosses.

== Conservation ==
In Europe, C. pratensis is typical of waxcap grasslands, a declining habitat due to changing agricultural practices. Though the species is one of the commoner members of the genus, it nonetheless appears on the official or provisional national red lists of threatened fungi in a few European countries, including the Czech Republic, Germany (Bavaria), and Poland.

== Edibility ==
The fruit bodies are edible and in some countries are seasonally collected for commercial sale in local markets.
