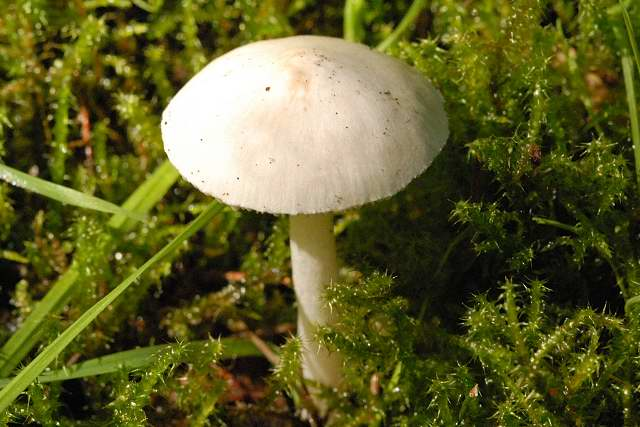

Scientific classification
- Domain: Eukaryota
- Kingdom: Fungi
- Division: Basidiomycota
- Class: Agaricomycetes
- Order: Agaricales
- Family: Agaricaceae
- Genus: Cystolepiota
- Species: C. seminuda

Binomial name
- Cystolepiota seminuda (Lasch) Bon 1976

= Cystolepiota seminuda =

Species of fungus

Cystolepiota seminuda is an inedible, common mushroom of the genus Cystolepiota. It can be found on humus, often along forest roads.

== Description ==
The cap is convex to bell shaped; white, evenly grainy, often with a fringed margin and up to 2 cm in diameter. The gills are white and crowded, with white spores. The stem is white, turning slightly purple when bruised, flaky and grainy.

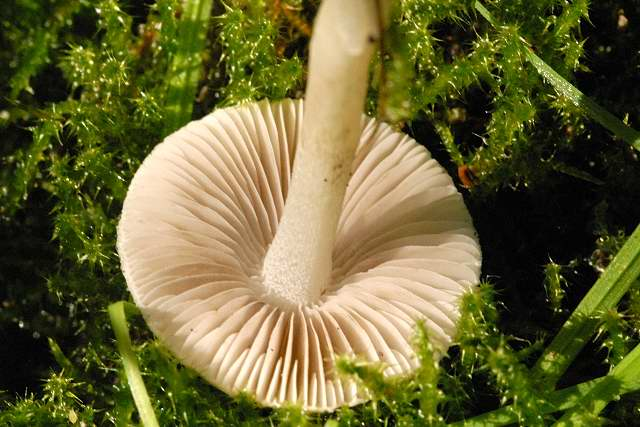
The underside of the mushroom
