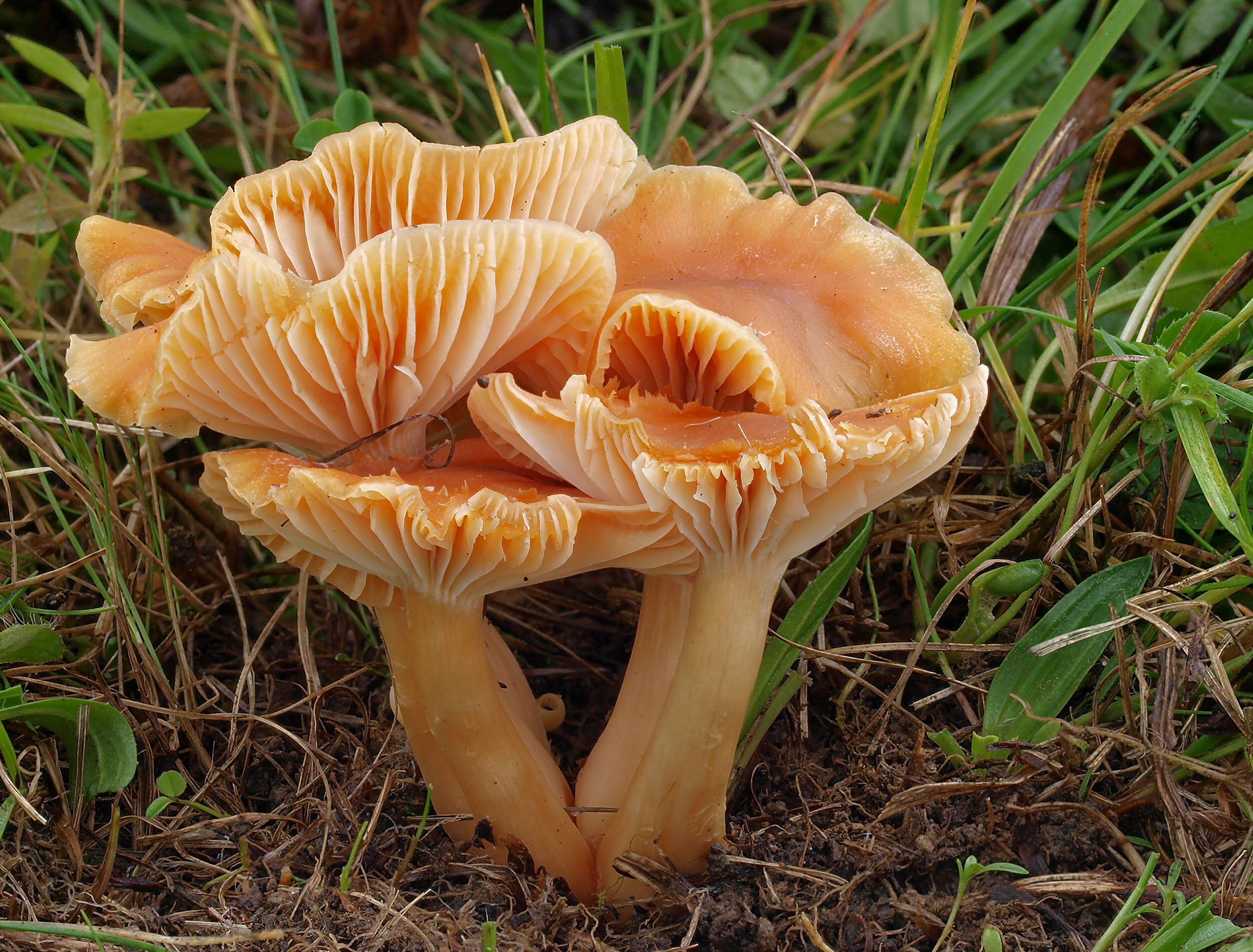
- Cuphophyllus pratensis

Scientific classification
- Kingdom: Fungi
- Division: Basidiomycota
- Class: Agaricomycetes
- Order: Agaricales
- Family: Hygrophoraceae
- Genus: Cuphophyllus (Donk) Bon (1985)

Type species
- Cuphophyllus pratensis (Pers.) Bon (1985)

= Cuphophyllus =

Genus of fungi

Cuphophyllus is a genus of agaric fungi in the family Hygrophoraceae. Cuphophyllus species belong to a group known as waxcaps in English, sometimes also waxy caps in North America or waxgills in New Zealand. In Europe, Cuphophyllus species are typical of waxcap grasslands, a declining habitat due to changing agricultural practices. As a result, six species, Cuphophyllus atlanticus (as C. canescens), C. colemannianus, C. flavipes, C. lacmus, C. lepidopus, and C. radiatus, are of global conservation concern and are listed as "vulnerable" on the IUCN Red List of Threatened Species.

== Taxonomy ==
=== History ===
The genus was described by French mycologist Marcel Bon in 1985, though it was subsequently synonymized with Hygrocybe by some authorities. Cuphophyllus species have sometimes been referred to the genus Camarophyllus (Fr.) P.Kumm. Donk (1962) argued that the type species of Camarophyllus must be Agaricus camarophyllus Alb. & Schwein. the species from which the genus takes its name. This would imply that Camarophyllus sensu stricto is a synonym of Hygrophorus, since A. camarophyllus is a Hygrophorus species (Hygrophorus camarophyllus). This is now accepted by all standard authorities. However, H. camarophyllus is not a species name included in the protologue of Camarophyllus, and Singer (1951) proposed Agaricus pratensis (= Cuphophyllus pratensis) as the type species of Camarophyllus. If Singer's typification is followed, then Camarophyllus (published in 1871) would be the correct name for Cuphophyllus.

=== Current status ===
Recent molecular research, based on cladistic analysis of DNA sequences, indicates that Cuphophyllus is monophyletic and forms a natural group distinct from Hygrocybe sensu stricto.

== Description ==
Species are distinguished from most other waxcaps by producing non-viscid, typically white, grey, or brownish basidiocarps (fruit bodies) often with decurrent lamellae (gills). Species of the genus Chromosera are superficially similar, though often more brightly coloured.

== Habitat and distribution ==
In Europe, Cuphophyllus species are typically found in agriculturally unimproved, short-sward grasslands (including pastures and lawns). Elsewhere, they are most frequently found in woodland. The genus is cosmopolitan.

== Economic usage ==
Fruit bodies of one of the commoner European waxcap species, C. pratensis, are edible and widely collected, sometimes being offered for sale in local markets.

== Species ==
The following species are recognised in the genus Cuphophyllus:

- C. acutoides (A.H. Sm. & Hesler) Lodge, Matheny & Sánchez-García (2013)
- C. adonis (Singer) Lodge & M.E. Sm. (2013)
- C. albidocinereus (Kalamees) Bon (1990)
- C. apricosus (E. Horak) J.A. Cooper (2023)
- C. atlanticus J.B. Jordal & E. Larss. (2021)
- C. aurantiopallens (E. Horak) J.A. Cooper (2023)
- C. aurantius (Murrill) Lodge, K.W. Hughes & Lickey (2013)
- C. austropratensis (A.M. Young) J.A. Cooper (2023)
- C. basidiosus (Peck) Lodge & Matheny (2013)
- C. bicolor (Dennis) Lodge & S.A. Cantrell (2013)
- C. bondii Lebeuf & I. Saar (2021)
- C. borealis (Peck) Bon ex Courtec. (1985)
- C. canescens (A.H. Sm. & Hesler) Bon (1990)
- C. canus (E. Horak) J.A. Cooper (2023)
- C. carcharias (E. Horak) J.A. Cooper (2023)
- C. cheelii (A.M. Young) J.A. Cooper (2023)
- C. cinerellus (Kühner) Bon (1985)
- C. colemannianus (A. Bloxam) Bon (1985)
- C. comosus (Bas & Arnolds) Lodge, Boertm. & E. Larss. (2020)
- C. delicatus (E. Horak) J.A. Cooper (2023)
- C. esteriae Voitk, I. Saar & E. Larss. (2020)
- C. flavipes (Britzelm.) Bon (1985)
- C. flavipesoides J.B. Jordal & E. Larss. (2021)
- C. fornicatus (Fr.) Lodge, Padamsee & Vizzini (2013)
- C. gloriae (G. Stev.) J.A. Cooper (2023)
- C. griseorufescens (E. Horak) Lodge & Padamsee (2013)
- C. impurus (E. Horak) J.A. Cooper (2023)
- C. lacmus (Schumach.) Bon (1985)
- C. lamarum Voitk, Boertm. & I. Saar (2020)
- C. laranja Desjardin & B.A. Perry (2020)
- C. lepidopus (Rea) A.M. Ainsw. (2017)
- C. neopratensis Courtec. & Fiard (2005)
- C. patinicolor (E. Horak) J.A. Cooper (2023)
- C. pegleri Lodge (1999)
- C. pratensis (Pers.) Bon (1985)
- C. pseudopallidus (Hesler & A.H. Sm.) Lodge, Boertm. & E. Larss. (2020)
- C. rainierensis (Hesler & A.H. Sm.) Lebeuf (2018)
- C. recurvatus (Peck) Lebeuf (2018)
- C. roseascens (E. Ludw. & J.G. Svenss.) Lebeuf (2018)
- C. roseipes (Massee) Lüderitz (2018)
- C. russocoriaceus (Berk. & T.K. Mill.) Bon (1985)
- C. salmonipes (G. Stev.) J.A. Cooper (2023)
- C. virgineus (Wulfen) Kovalenko (1989)
- C. yacurensis Barili, C.W. Barnes & Ordoñez (2017)
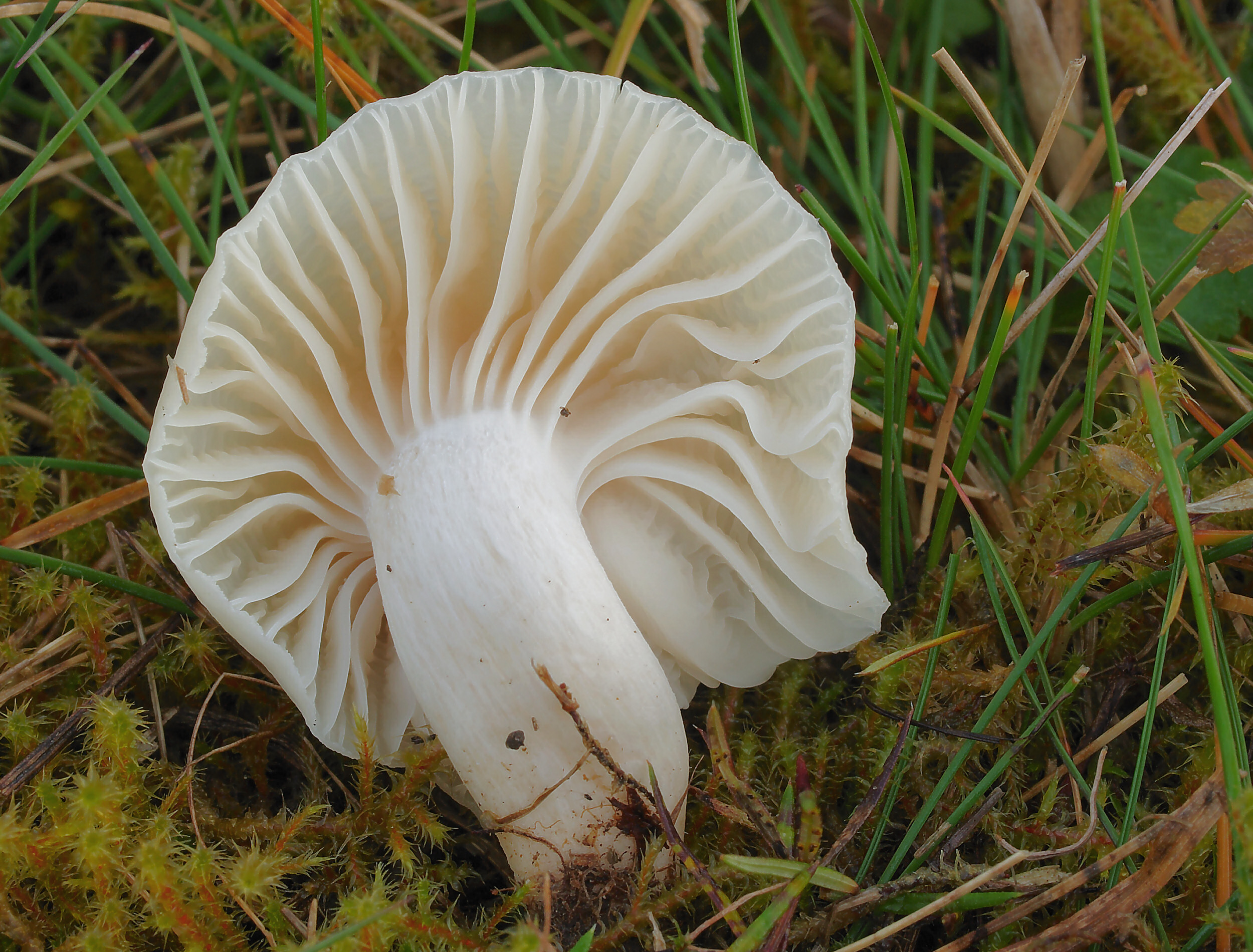
Cuphophyllus virgineus

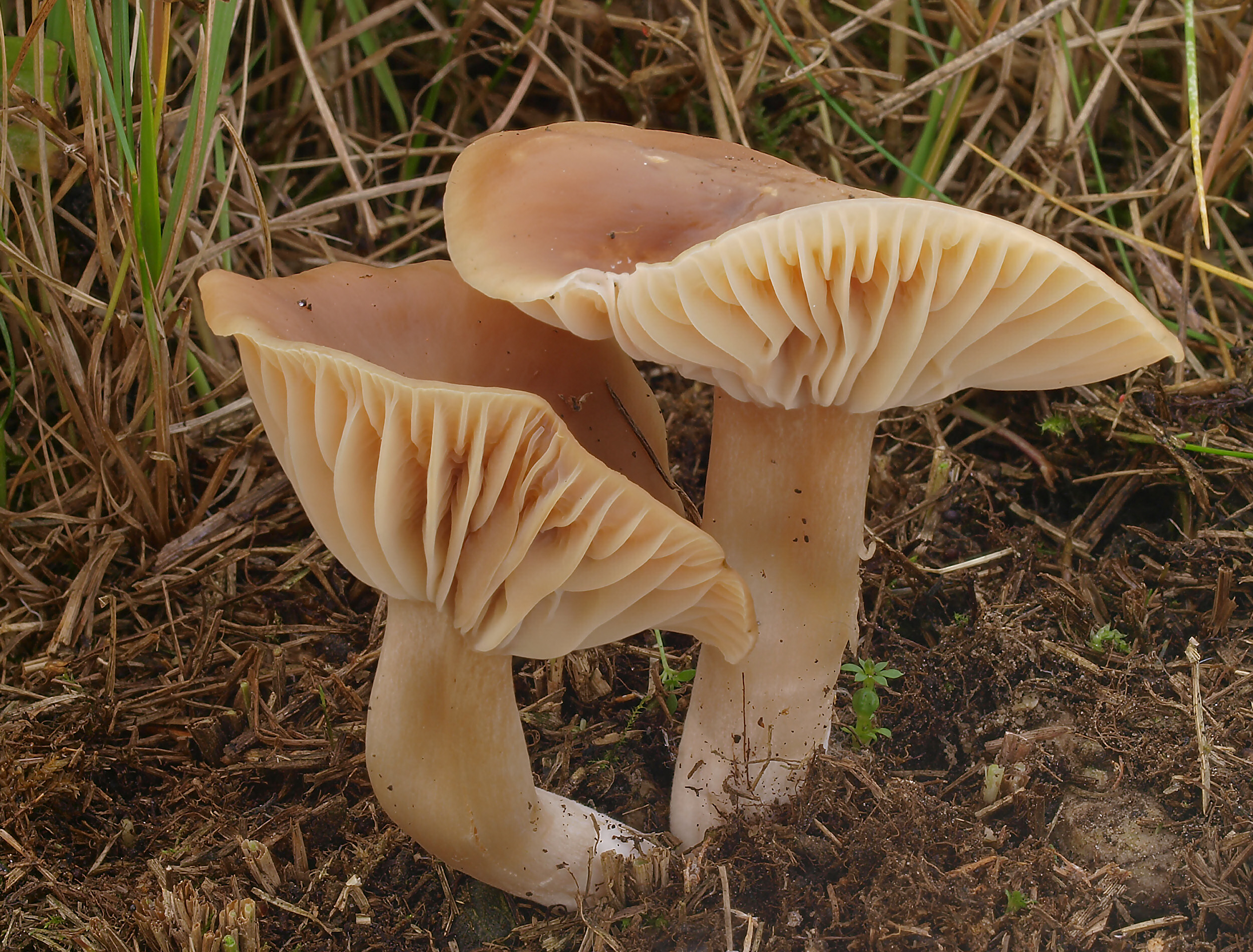
Cuphophyllus colemannianus

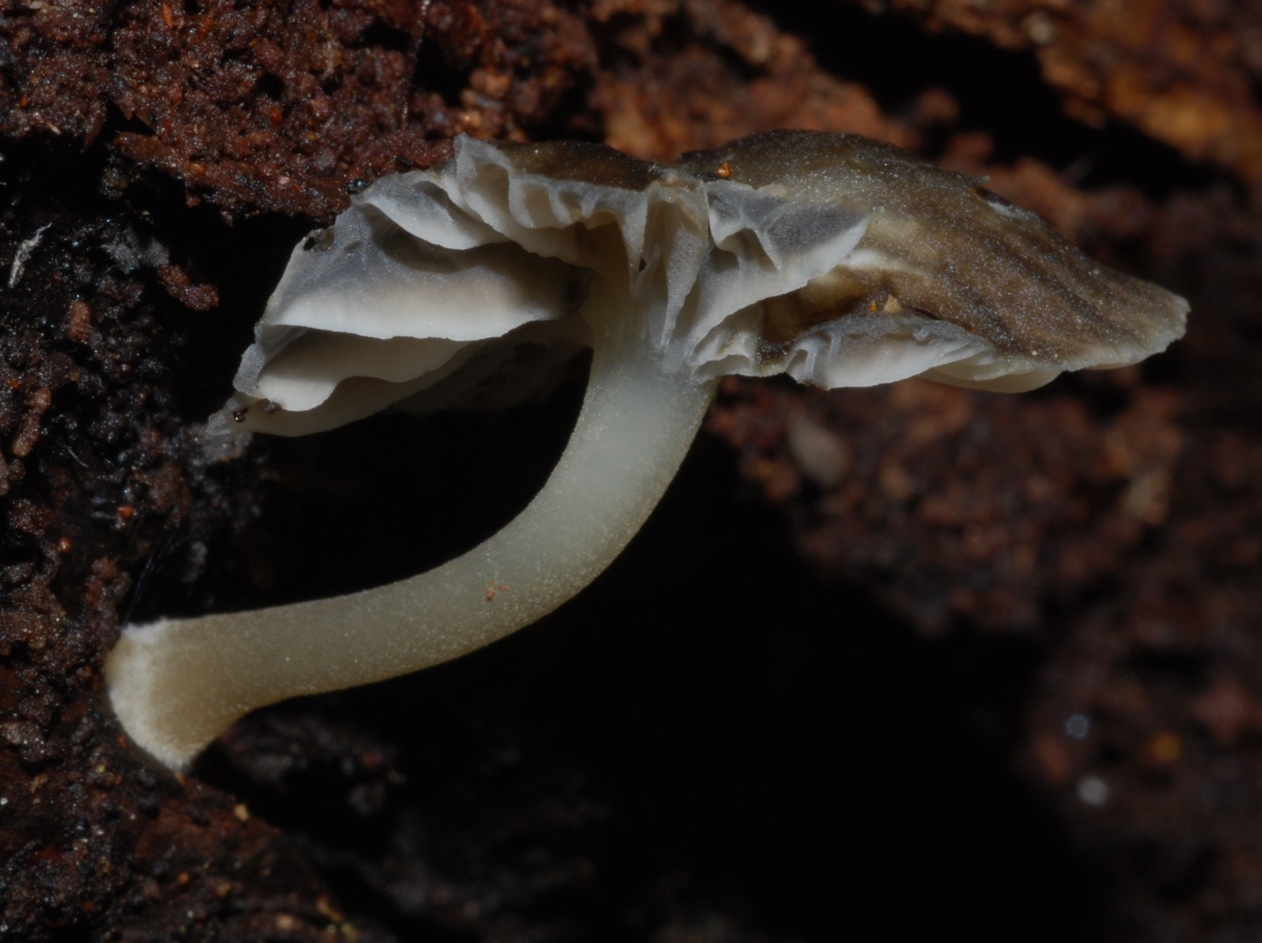
Cuphophyllus griseorufescens

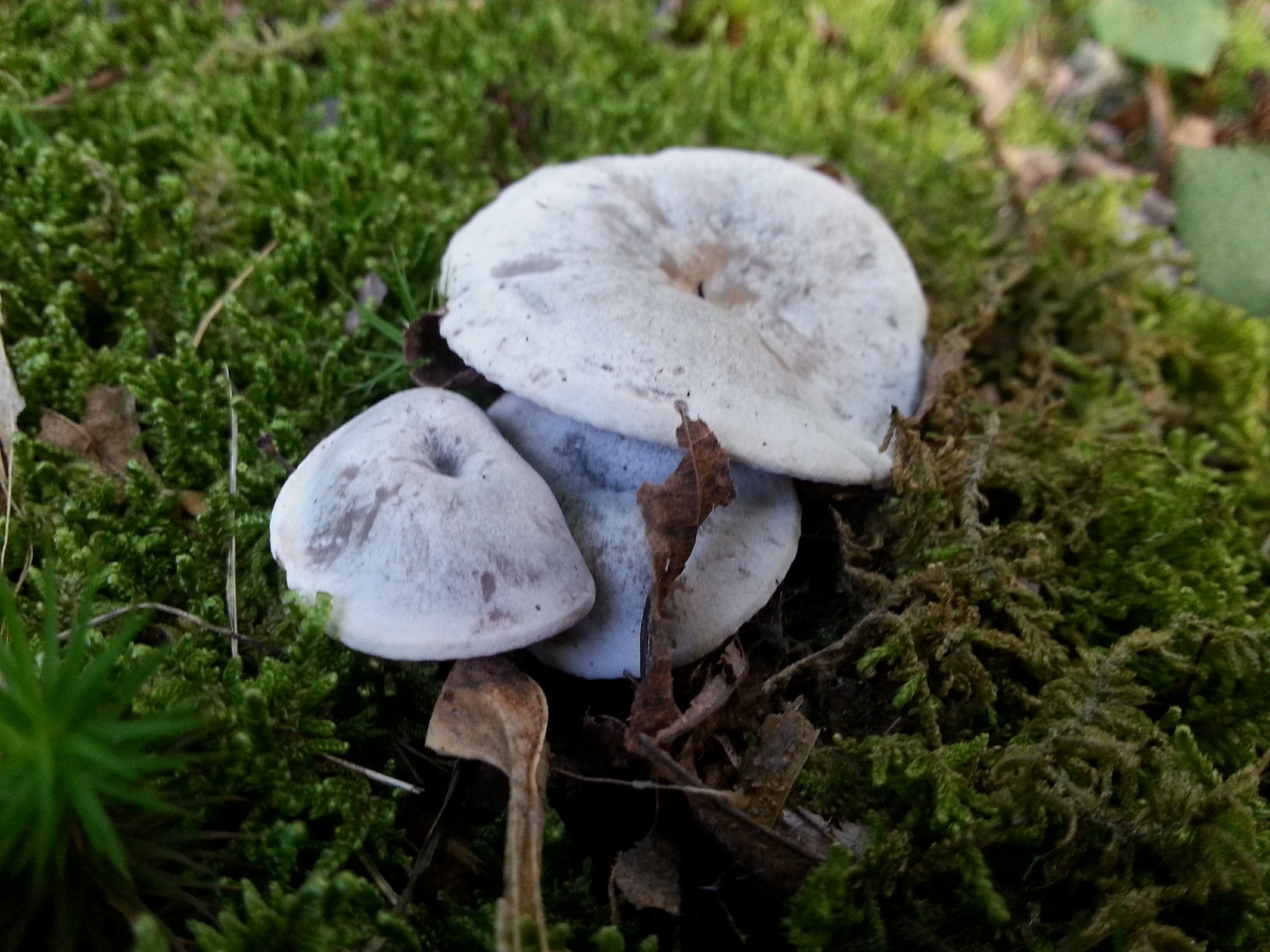
Cuphophyllus canescens

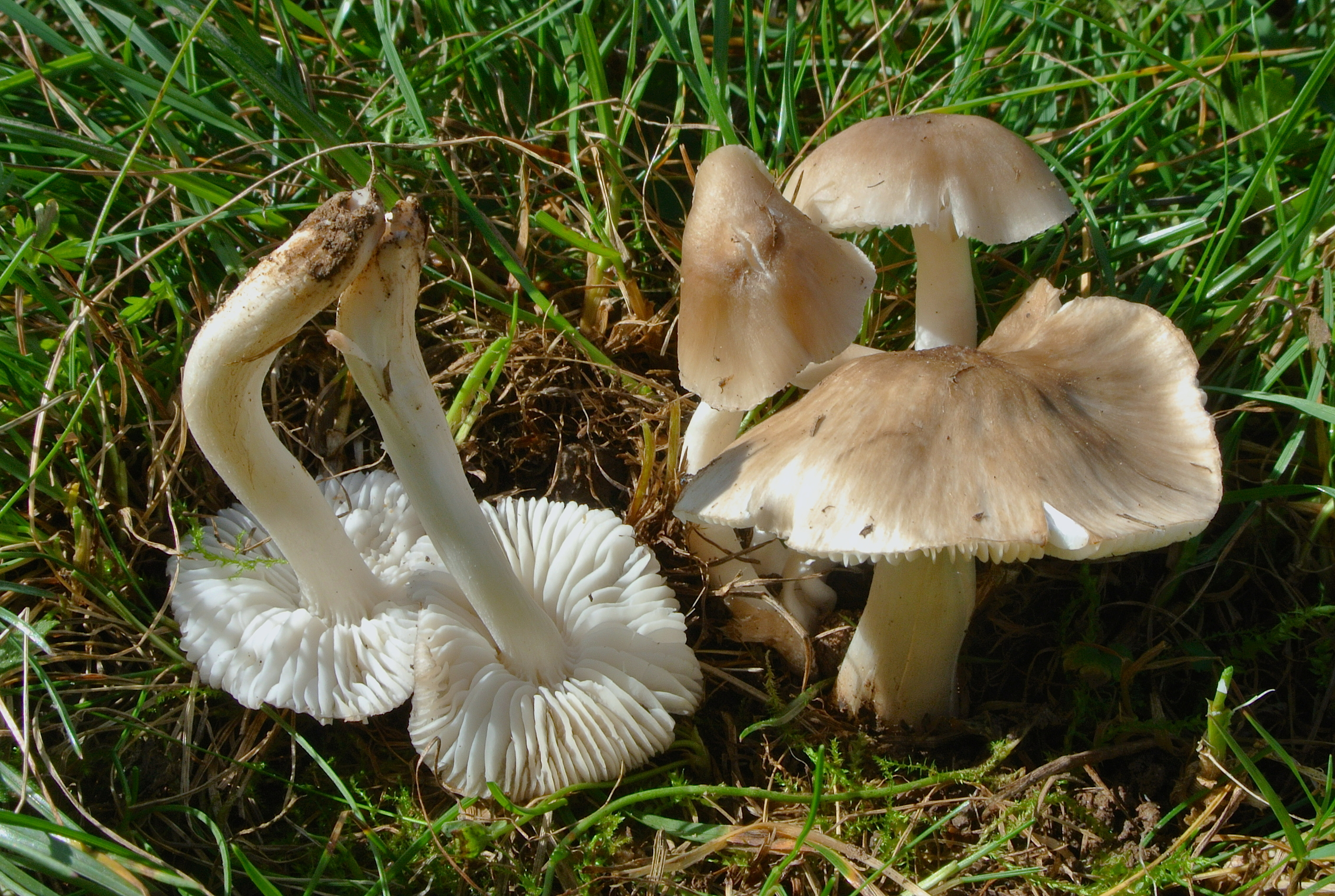
Cuphophyllus fornicatus

== See also ==
- List of Agaricales genera
