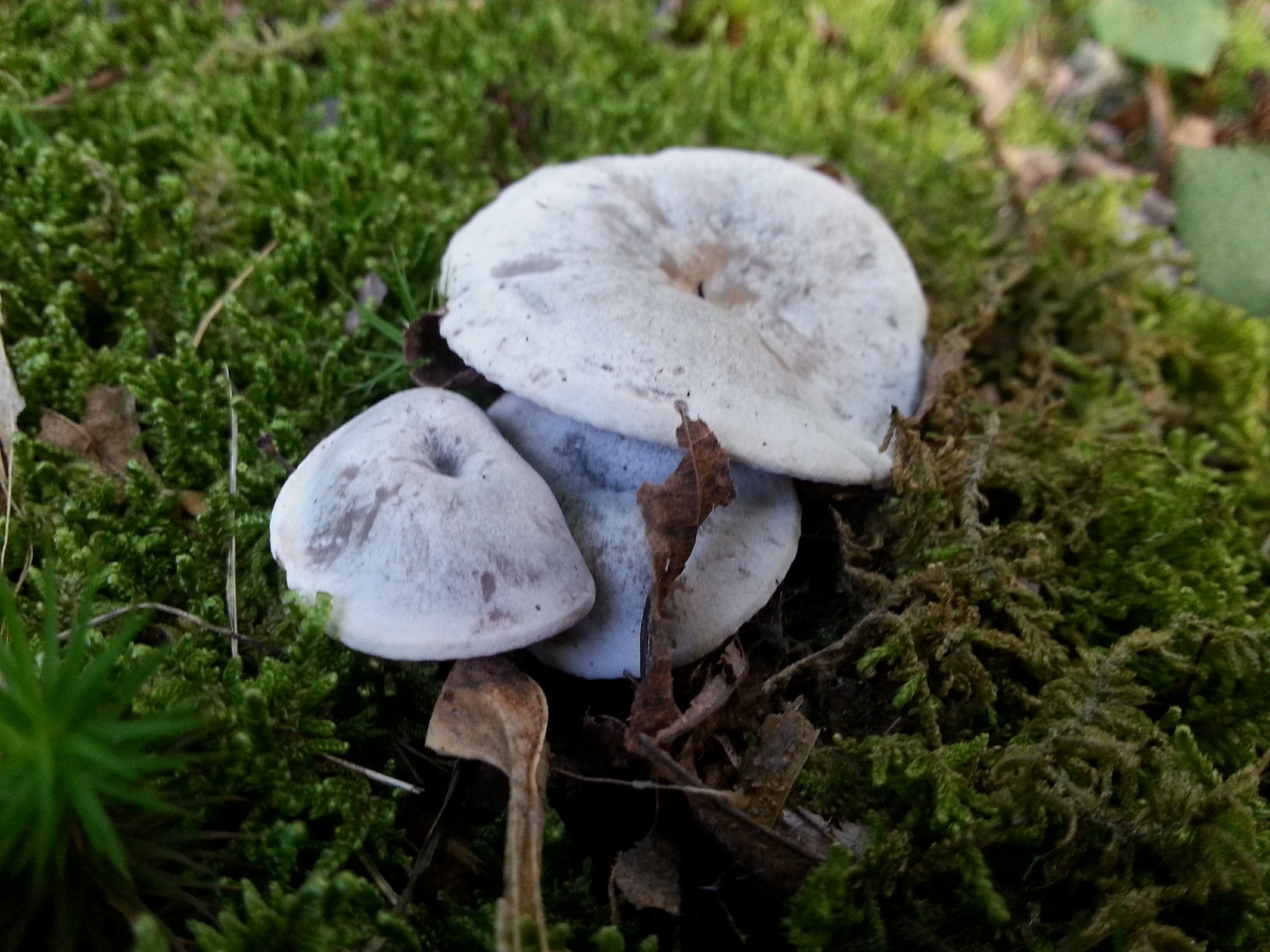
- Cuphophyllus canescens, Pennsylvania

Conservation status
- Vulnerable (IUCN 3.1)

Scientific classification
- Kingdom: Fungi
- Division: Basidiomycota
- Class: Agaricomycetes
- Order: Agaricales
- Family: Hygrophoraceae
- Genus: Cuphophyllus
- Species: C. canescens

Binomial name
- Cuphophyllus canescens (A.H.Sm. & Hesler) Bon (1990)

Synonyms
- Hygrophorus canescens; Camarophyllus canescens; Hygrocybe canescens

= Cuphophyllus canescens =

Species of fungus

Cuphophyllus canescens is a species of agaric (gilled mushroom) in the family Hygrophoraceae, known from North America. In its wide sense (including the recently separated C. atlanticus) it has been assessed as globally "vulnerable" on the IUCN Red List of Threatened Species.

== Taxonomy ==
The species was first described from North Carolina in 1942 by American mycologists Alexander H. Smith and Lexemuel Ray Hesler as Hygrophorus canescens. It was transferred to the genus Cuphophyllus by French mycologist Marcel Bon in 1990, at which time it was thought also to occur in northern Europe. As a result of molecular research, based on cladistic analysis of DNA sequences, Cuphophyllus canescens has, however, been found to be restricted to North America.

=== Similar species ===
Cuphophyllus atlanticus is very similar, but is said to have a pure gray to bluish gray cap and (microscopically) larger, subglobose spores.

== See also ==
- List of fungi by conservation status
