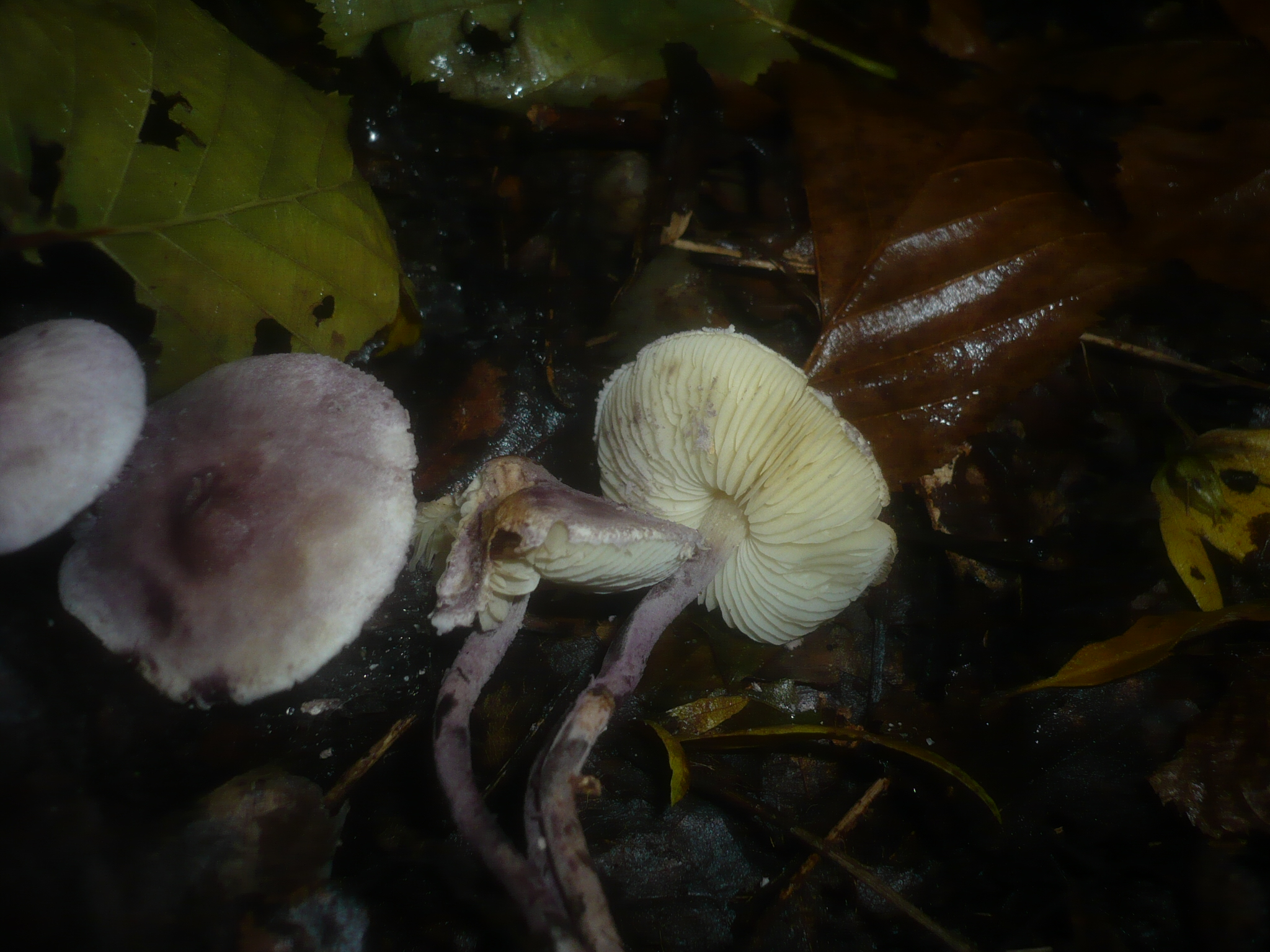

Scientific classification
- Domain: Eukaryota
- Kingdom: Fungi
- Division: Basidiomycota
- Class: Agaricomycetes
- Order: Agaricales
- Family: Agaricaceae
- Genus: Cystolepiota
- Species: C. bucknallii

Binomial name
- Cystolepiota bucknallii (Berk. & Broome) Singer & Clémençon (1972)

Synonyms
- Agaricus bucknallii Berk. & Broome (1881); Lepiota bucknallii (Berk. & Broome) Sacc. (1887); Lepiota seminuda var. lilacina Quél. (1877); Lepiota lilacina (Quél.) Mussat (1900); Cystoderma bucknallii (Berk. & Broome) Singer (1939); Cystolepiota bucknallii var. lilacina (Quél.) Bon (1993)

= Cystolepiota bucknallii =

Cystolepiota bucknallii Mycological characteristics
- Gills on hymenium
- Cap is convex
- Hymenium is free
- Stipe is bare
- Spore print is white
- Ecology is saprotrophic
- Edibility is inedible

Cystolepiota bucknallii is a species of basidiomycete fungus of the genus Cystolepiota. Found throughout Europe, it is a rare fungus occurring in deciduous forests. The small fruit bodies bear a distinctive smell of coal gas and appear in autumn on damp ground. It is not an edible mushroom.

== Description ==
The fruit body of Cystolepiota bucknallii is a relatively small, thin-fleshed agaric. The cap is at first hemispherical and becomes convex with maturity. It bears a broad central umbo and reaches 5 cm in diameter. The cap cuticle is white with a lilac or violet tinge. The gills are crowded and not attached to the stipe. Their colour is cream to pale yellow. The stipe is comparatively long (up to 6 cm), slender and bare, tinged lilac or violet except for the uppermost section where it is pallid. Both cap and stipe are covered with a mealy powder which is easily rubbed off. All parts are fragile. The flesh is white, thin and does not bear a distinctive taste.

The spore mass is white. With the aid of a light microscope, the spores are seen ellipsoid, smooth and colourless. When Melzer's reagent is applied, the spore walls barely stain; hence, the spores are weakly dextrinoid. Their dimensions are 7.5–10 μm by 1–3.5 μm.

Cystolepiota bucknallii has a characteristically pungent odour, reminiscent of coal gas or sulphur. Indole is present in this as well as in other similar-scented fungi: Tricholoma inamoenum, Tricholoma lascivum, Tricholoma sulphureum and others.

While its edibility is not known, there exists speculation about possible toxicity.

== Habitat ==
C. bucknallii has been recorded in various countries in central and northern Europe including France, Belgium, Switzerland, Austria, Germany, Denmark, Norway, Sweden and Russia. It is a terrestrial decomposer which occurs in deciduous forests with moist, calcareous soils rich in nutrients and especially nitrogen. Fruit bodies appear in autumn. Moreover, C. bucknallii is an uncommon or rare fungus whose populations are found in communities harbouring a diversity of other rare species. A population may serve as an indicator for rich, conservable biotopes.
