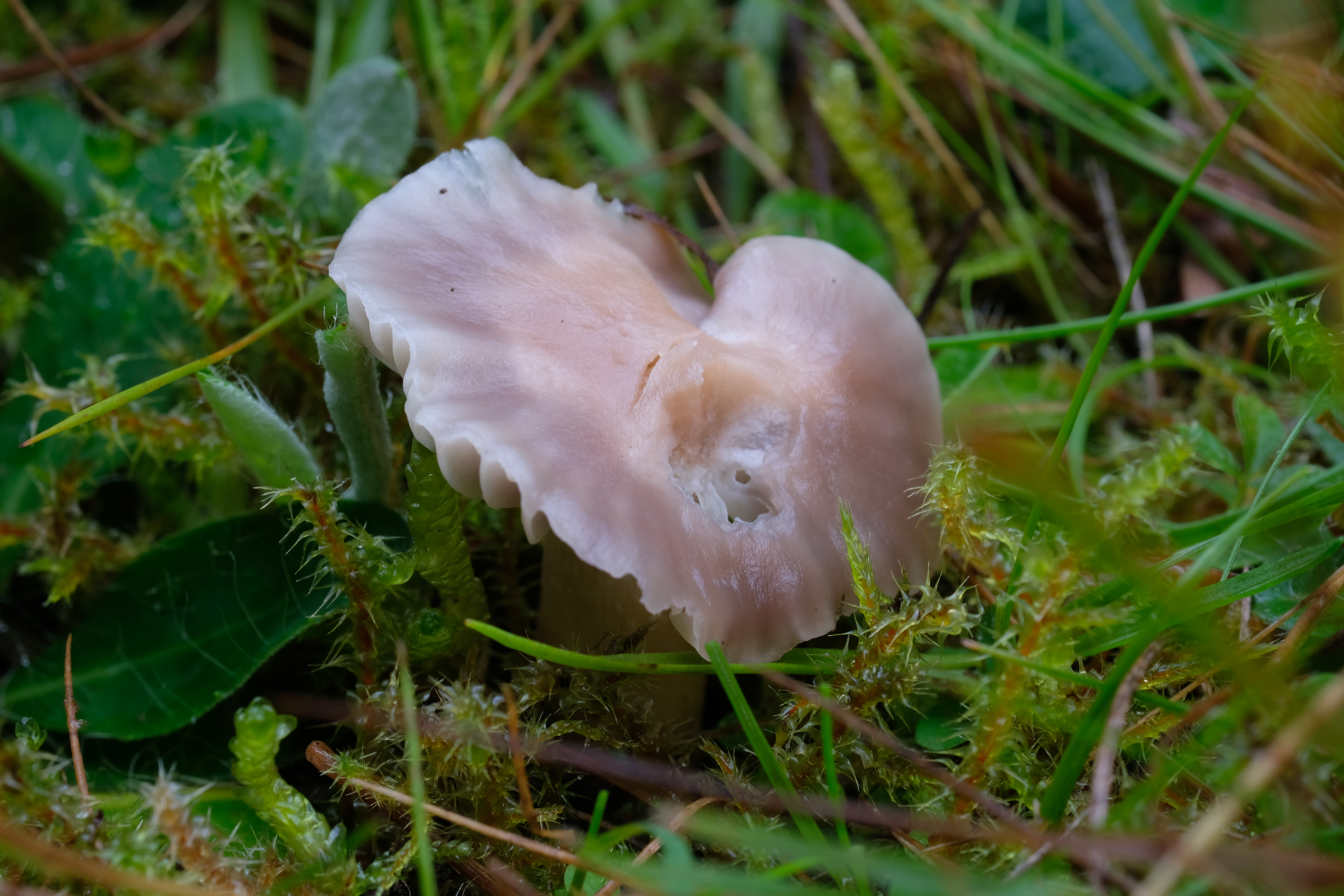

Conservation status
- Vulnerable (IUCN 3.1)

Scientific classification
- Kingdom: Fungi
- Division: Basidiomycota
- Class: Agaricomycetes
- Order: Agaricales
- Family: Hygrophoraceae
- Genus: Cuphophyllus
- Species: C. flavipes

Binomial name
- Cuphophyllus flavipes (Britzelm.) Bon (1985)

Synonyms
- Hygrophorus flavipes Britzelm. (1891); Camarophyllus flavipes (Britzelm.) Clémençon (1982); Hygrocybe flavipes (Britzelm.) Bon (1984)

= Cuphophyllus flavipes =

Species of fungus

Cuphophyllus flavipes is a species of agaric (gilled mushroom) in the family Hygrophoraceae. It has been given the recommended English name of yellow foot waxcap. The species has a European distribution, occurring mainly in agriculturally unimproved grassland. Threats to its habitat have resulted in the species being assessed as globally "vulnerable" on the IUCN Red List of Threatened Species.

== Taxonomy ==
The species was first described from Germany in 1891 by mycologist Max Britzelmayr as Hygrophorus flavipes. It was transferred to the genus Cuphophyllus by the French mycologist Marcel Bon in 1985.

Recent molecular research, based on cladistic analysis of DNA sequences, has confirmed that Cuphophyllus flavipes is a distinct species.

== Description ==
Basidiocarps are agaricoid, up to 60mm (3 in) tall, the cap broadly conical to flat or slightly depressed when expanded, up to 40mm (2 in) across. The cap surface is smooth, slightly greasy when damp, grey to brownish grey. The lamellae (gills) are waxy, thick, decurrent (running down the stipe), pale to dark grey. The stipe (stem) is smooth, pale greyish to white but yellow towards the base, lacking a ring. The spore print is white, the spores (under a microscope) smooth, inamyloid, ellipsoid, c. 6 to 7.5 by 5 to 6 μm.

=== Similar species ===
The recently described, Scandinavian Cuphophyllus flavipesoides is very similar, having the lower part of the stipe flushed yellow, but has slightly narrower spores. Cuphophyllus lacmus is similarly coloured, but lacks the yellow base to the stem.

== Distribution and habitat ==
The yellow foot waxcap is widespread but uncommon throughout Europe. Like most other European waxcaps, Cuphophyllus flavipes occurs in old, agriculturally unimproved, short-sward grassland (pastures and lawns).

Recent research suggests waxcaps are neither mycorrhizal nor saprotrophic but may be associated with mosses.

== Conservation ==
Cuphophyllus lacmus is typical of waxcap grasslands, a declining habitat due to changing agricultural practices. As a result, the species is of global conservation concern and is listed as "vulnerable" on the IUCN Red List of Threatened Species.
