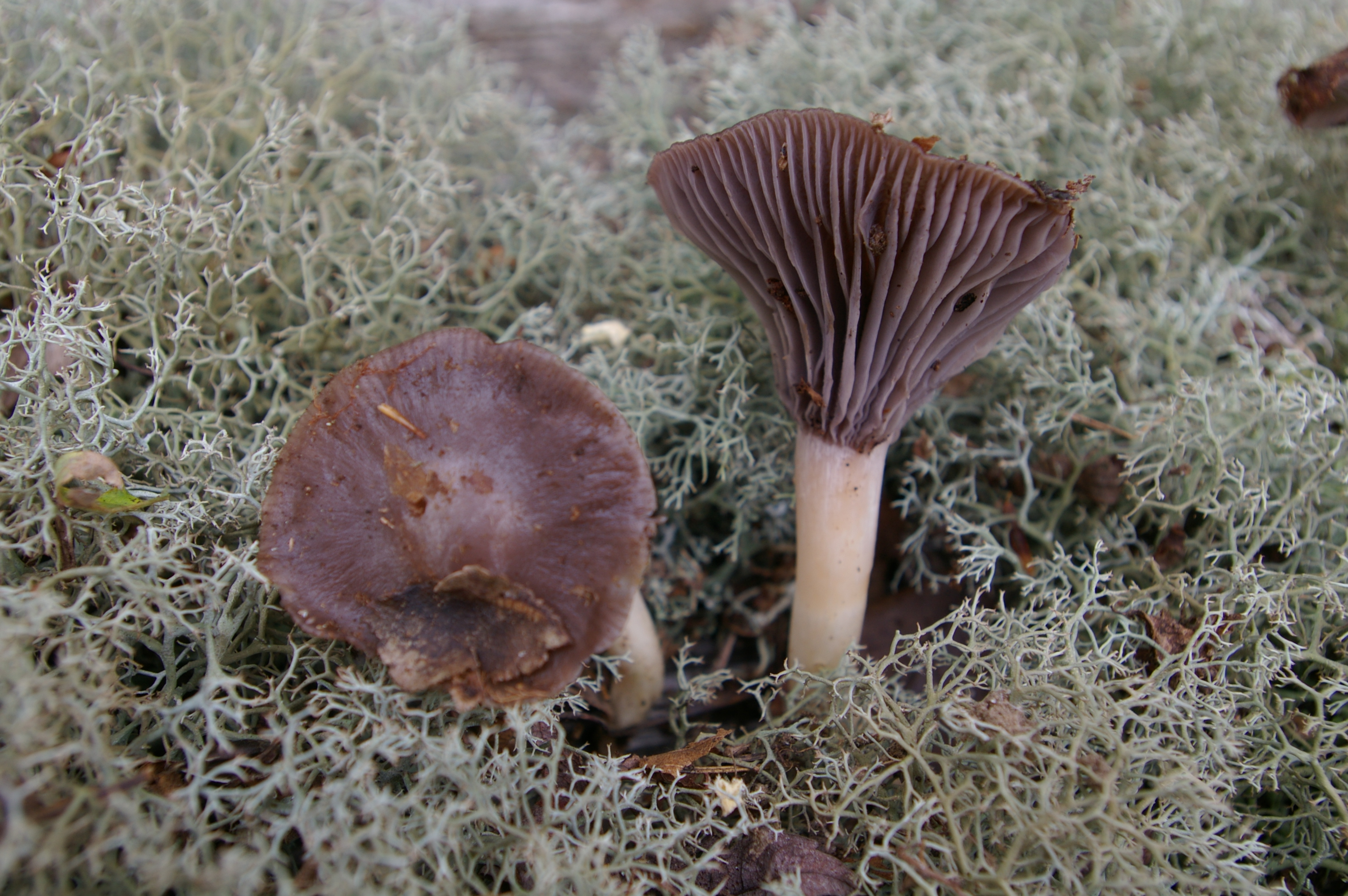

Conservation status
- Vulnerable (IUCN 3.1)

Scientific classification
- Kingdom: Fungi
- Division: Basidiomycota
- Class: Agaricomycetes
- Order: Agaricales
- Family: Hygrophoraceae
- Genus: Cuphophyllus
- Species: C. lacmus

Binomial name
- Cuphophyllus lacmus (Schumach.) Bon (1985)

Synonyms
- Agaricus lacmus Schumach. (1803); Hygrophorus lacmus (Schumach.) Kalchbr. (1873); Camarophyllus lacmus (Schumach.) J.E. Lange (1938); Hygrocybe lacmus (Schumach.) P.D. Orton & Watling (1969)

= Cuphophyllus lacmus =

grey waxcap

Species of fungus

Cuphophyllus lacmus is a species of agaric (gilled mushroom) in the family Hygrophoraceae. It has been given the recommended English name of grey waxcap. The species has a European distribution, occurring mainly in agriculturally unimproved grassland. Threats to its habitat have resulted in the species being assessed as globally "vulnerable" on the IUCN Red List of Threatened Species.

== Taxonomy ==
The species was first described from Denmark in 1803 by naturalist Heinrich Schumacher as Agaricus lacmus. It was transferred to the genus Cuphophyllus by the French mycologist Marcel Bon in 1985.

Recent molecular research, based on cladistic analysis of DNA sequences, has confirmed that Cuphophyllus lacmus is a distinct species, but within a group (including Cuphophyllus subviolaceus) that requires further research.

== Description ==
Basidiocarps are agaricoid, up to 70mm (5 in) tall, the cap hemispherical at first, becoming broadly convex to flat when expanded, up to 60mm (3 in) across. The cap surface is smooth, slightly greasy when damp, grey to bluish grey. The lamellae (gills) are waxy, thick, decurrent (running down the stipe), pale to dark grey. The stipe (stem) is smooth, white, lacking a ring. The spore print is white, the spores (under a microscope) smooth, inamyloid, ellipsoid, c. 7 to 8 by 4.5 to 6 μm.

=== Similar species ===
The Yellow Foot Waxcap Cuphophyllus flavipes and the Scandinavian Cuphophyllus flavipesoides are superficially similar, but in both species the lower part of the stipe is flushed yellow. Cuphophyllus subviolaceus, long considered a synonym of C. lacmus, has been shown to be a distinct species occurring in both Europe and North America, but further research is required to distinguish it morphologically.

== Distribution and habitat ==
The Grey Waxcap is widespread but generally rare throughout Europe. It is also known from Greenland. Like most other European waxcaps, Cuphophyllus lacmus occurs in old, agriculturally unimproved, short-sward grassland (pastures and lawns).

Recent research suggests waxcaps are neither mycorrhizal nor saprotrophic but may be associated with mosses.

== Conservation ==
Cuphophyllus lacmus is typical of waxcap grasslands, a declining habitat due to changing agricultural practices. As a result, the species is of global conservation concern and is listed as "vulnerable" on the IUCN Red List of Threatened Species. Cuphophyllus lacmus also appears on the official or provisional national red lists of threatened fungi in several European countries, including Croatia, Czech Republic, Denmark, Finland, Germany, Norway, and Sweden.

== See also ==
- List of fungi by conservation status
