= Pulverolepiota petasiformis =

Scientific classification
- Kingdom: Fungi
- Division: Basidiomycota
- Class: Agaricomycetes
- Order: Agaricales
- Family: Agaricaceae
- Genus: Cystolepiota
- Species: P. petasiformis

Binomial name
- Pulverolepiota petasiformis (Murrill) H. Qu, Damm & Z.W. Ge

Synonyms
- Lepiota petasiformis Murrill; Cystolepiota petasiformis (Murrill) Singer (1975); Cystolepiota petasiformis (Murrill) Vellinga (2006)

Pulverolepiota petasifo Mycological characteristics
- Gills on hymenium
- Cap is campanulate or convex
- Hymenium is adnexed or free
- Spore print is white
- Edibility is unknown

Pulverolepiota petasiformis, commonly known as the duncecap powderhead, is a species of mushroom in the genus Pulverolepiota. It is found in Europe and Africa, and rare in the Pacific Northwest.

== Taxonomy ==
Pulverolepiota petasiformis was first described as Lepiota petasiformis by William Murrill in 1912. Later, it was transferred to the genus Cystolepiota, and subsequently to Pulverolepiota in 2023.

== Description ==
The cap of Pulverolepiota petasiformis is 1–5 centimeters in diameter. It can be beige or white, and often has a tan spot in the middle. When young, it is covered in a white powder, but it gets smoother with age. The stipe is 2–7 centimeters long and 2–5 millimeters wide. The gills are whitish when young, but will sometimes turn tan as the mushroom gets older.

== Habitat and ecology ==
In the Pacific Northwest, Pulverolepiota petasiformis grows in alder leaf litter and under western redcedar trees.
