= Cystolepiota albogilva =

Scientific classification
- Domain: Eukaryota
- Kingdom: Fungi
- Division: Basidiomycota
- Class: Agaricomycetes
- Order: Agaricales
- Family: Agaricaceae
- Genus: Cystolepiota
- Species: C. albogilva

Binomial name
- Cystolepiota albogilva Singer (1989)

Species of fungus

Cystolepiota albogilva Mycological characteristics
- Gills on hymenium
- Cap is convex
- Hymenium is free
- Stipe is bare
- Spore print is white
- Ecology is saprotrophic
- Edibility is unknown

Cystolepiota albogilva is a species of mushroom producing fungus in the family Agaricaceae.

== Taxonomy ==
It was described in 1989 by the German mycologist Rolf Singer who classified it as Cystolepiota albogilva.

== Description ==
Cystolepiota albogilva is a small white mushroom with white flesh.

Cap: Up to 1cm wide, convex and flattening with age finally with a slight depression in the centre. The surface is covered with woolly scales (floccosus) which are white at the margins and discolouring yellow towards the centre. Gills: Free, crowded and whitish or pale cream. Stem: 1.5-1.9cm tall and 1-2mm wide.The surface is white and appears smooth and bare but it has a subtle frosted coating that may be more visible with a lens. The stem runs equally to the base where whitish mycelium may be present. There is no stem ring. Spores: Ellipsoidal. Nonamyloid, hyaline or yellowish in KOH. 3.8-5.5 x 2.5 μm. Basidia: 11-13 x 3.5-4.5 μm. Four spored. Smell: Indistinct.

== Habitat and distribution ==
The specimens studied by Singer were found growing on the ground near Igapó forests in Ponta Negra, Brazil.
