= Cuphophyllus rainierensis =

Scientific classification
- Kingdom: Fungi
- Division: Basidiomycota
- Class: Agaricomycetes
- Order: Agaricales
- Family: Hygrophoraceae
- Genus: Cuphophyllus
- Species: C. rainierensis

Binomial name
- Cuphophyllus rainierensis (Hesler & A.H. Sm.) Leabeuf

Synonyms
- Hygrophorus rainierensis Hesler & A.H. Sm.

Species of fungus

Cuphophyllus rainierensis is a species of mushroom in the family Hygrophoraceae.

== Taxonomy ==
Cuphophyllus russocoriaceus was first described by Lexemuel Ray Hesler and Alexander H. Smith in 1963. In 2018, it was formally transferred to the genus Cuphophyllus.

== Description ==
The cap of Cuphophyllus rainierensis is lilac to purplish gray in color, and has a slightly slimy to moist texture. It is flat at maturity, and 1–3.5 centimeters in diameter. The stipe is 4–8.5 centimeters long and 3-7 millimeters wide. It is whitish in color. The gills are decurrent and range in color from whitish to purplish gray. The spore print is white. The mushroom smells like green corn.

=== Similar species ===
Cuphophyllus lacmus is very similar, and may actually be the same species, but it is found in Europe, bruises yellow at the stipe base, and lacks the scent of C. rainierensis. C. nordmanensis is similar as well, but it is found in Idaho and eastern Washington and has larger spores.

Cuphophyllus rainierensis
- Mycological characteristics
- Gills on hymenium
- Cap is flat
- Hymenium is decurrent
- Stipe is bare
- Spore print is white
- Edibility is unknown

== Habitat and distribution ==
Cuphopjyllus rainierensis is found in southern Canada and the northern United States. It was originally described from Mt. Rainier, Washington. It often grows under conifers, though its ecological role is unknown.
