= Cystolepiota potassiovirens =

Scientific classification
- Domain: Eukaryota
- Kingdom: Fungi
- Division: Basidiomycota
- Class: Agaricomycetes
- Order: Agaricales
- Family: Agaricaceae
- Genus: Cystolepiota
- Species: C. potassiovirens

Binomial name
- Cystolepiota potassiovirens Singer (1989)

Species of fungus

Cystolepiota potassiovirens Mycological characteristics
- Gills on hymenium
- Cap is convex
- Hymenium is free
- Ecology is saprotrophic
- Edibility is unknown

Cystolepiota potassiovirens is a species of mushroom producing fungus in the family Agaricaceae.

== Taxonomy ==
It was described in 1989 by the German mycologist Rolf Singer who classified it as Cystolepiota potassiovirens.

== Description ==
Cystolepiota potassiovirens is a very small brownish mushroom with brown flesh.

Cap: 1cm wide and convex with a small umbo. The surface is brown to dark brown with a pale orange umbo covered with furfuraceous (bran like) scales. Gills: Free, dark brown and close to crowded. They have a slight ventricose bulge in the middle. Stem: 1.7cm tall and 0.8-1mm thick and subequal. The surface is dark brown with a pruinose (powdery) coating. Spores: Ellipsoidal without a germ pore, hyaline, non-amyloid but greenish in KOH. 3.3-4 x 2.5-3μm. Basidia: 15-21 x 5 μm. Four spored. Smell: Indistinct.

== Etymology ==
The specific epithet potassiovirens derives from the Latin potassio meaning potassium and virens meaning green. This is in reference to the green colouration the spores develop in Potassium Hydroxide (KOH).

== Habitat and distribution ==
The specimens studied by Singer were found growing solitary or gregariously on the ground in the tropical forests of Brazil, 30km North of Manaus.
