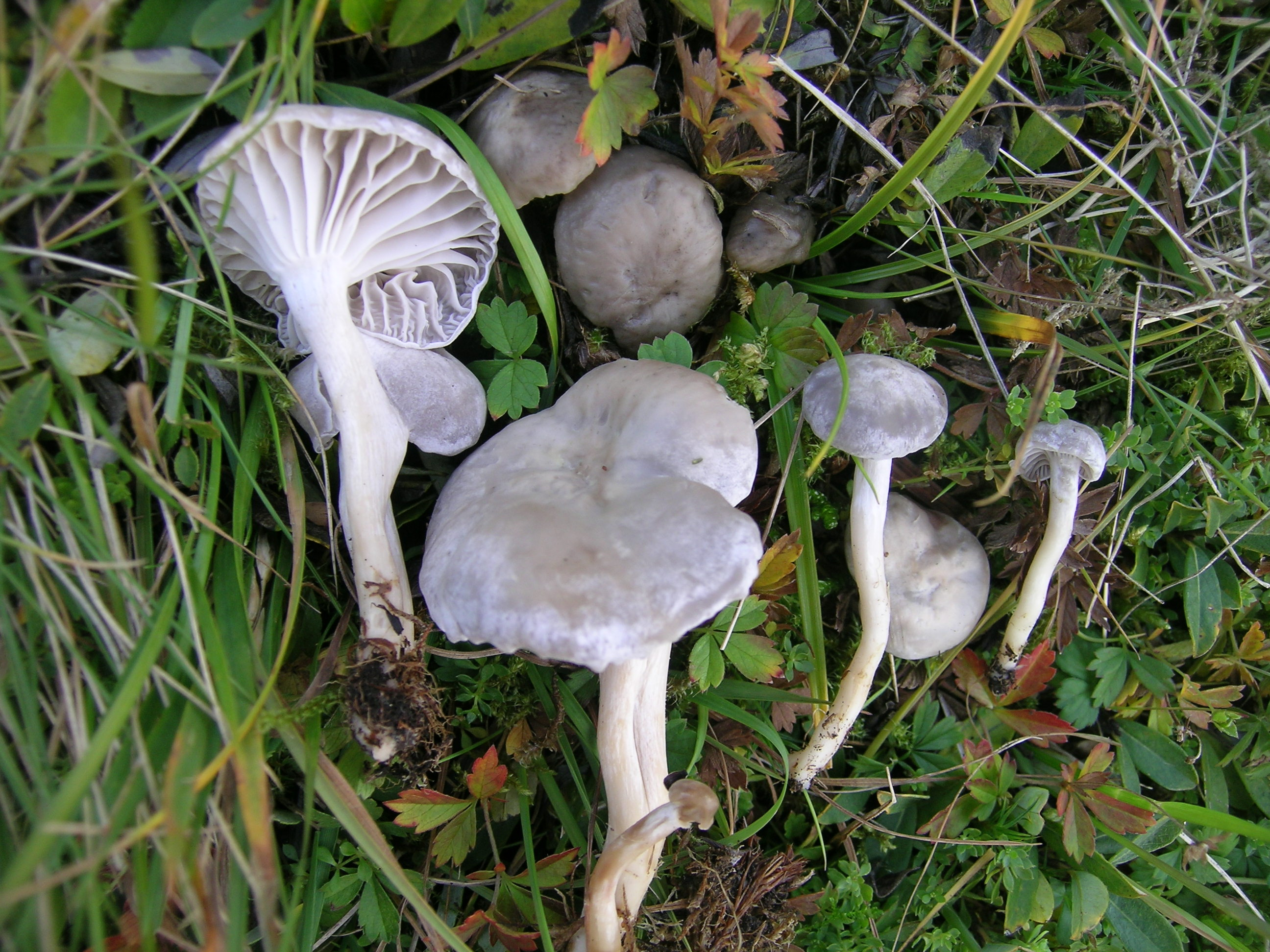
- Cuphophyllus atlanticus, Norway

Conservation status
- Vulnerable (IUCN 3.1)

Scientific classification
- Kingdom: Fungi
- Division: Basidiomycota
- Class: Agaricomycetes
- Order: Agaricales
- Family: Hygrophoraceae
- Genus: Cuphophyllus
- Species: C. atlanticus

Binomial name
- Cuphophyllus atlanticus J.B. Jordal & E. Larss. (2021)

= Cuphophyllus atlanticus =

Felted waxcap

Species of fungus

Cuphophyllus atlanticus is a species of agaric (gilled mushroom) in the family Hygrophoraceae. Until recently (2021), the species was considered to be conspecific with the North American Cuphophyllus canescens, but DNA sequencing has shown that it is distinct. As C. canescens, it has been given the recommended English name of felted waxcap in the United Kingdom. Cuphophyllus atlanticus has a European and North American distribution, occurring in Europe mainly in agriculturally unimproved grassland. Threats to its habitat have resulted in C. canescens (including C. atlanticus) being assessed as globally "vulnerable" on the IUCN Red List of Threatened Species.

== Taxonomy ==
The species was first described from Norway in 2021 as a result of molecular research, based on cladistic analysis of DNA sequences. Previously, European specimens had been referred to the similar Cuphophyllus canescens, but the latter species appears to be confined to North America.

== Description ==
Basidiocarps are agaricoid, up to 40mm (1.5 in) tall, the cap broadly convex to flat when expanded, up to 40mm (1.5 in) across. The cap surface is smooth, dry, slightly felted, grey to bluish grey. The lamellae (gills) are thick, decurrent (running down the stipe), pale grey. The stipe (stem) is smooth, white to pale grey, lacking a ring. The spore print is white, the spores (under a microscope) smooth, inamyloid, subglobose, c. 5.5 to 6 by 4.5 to 5 μm.

=== Similar species ===
In Europe, the felted waxcap is distinguished from other grey species of Cuphophyllus by its dry, slightly felted cap that is never viscid or greasy. In North America, C. canescens is very similar, but is said to have drab or brownish tints in the cap and (microscopically) smaller, more globose spores measuring 4 to 5 μm across.

== Distribution and habitat ==
In Europe, DNA studies have confirmed the presence of the felted waxcap in Norway, Sweden, and Scotland. This is the same northerly distribution previously noted for "C. canescens" in Europe. In North America, C. atlanticus has been confirmed from the United States (North Carolina) and Canada.

Recent research suggests waxcaps are neither mycorrhizal nor saprotrophic but may be associated with mosses.

== Conservation ==
In Europe, Cuphophyllus atlanticus is typical of waxcap grasslands, a declining habitat due to changing agricultural practices. As a result, the species is of global conservation concern and (as C. canescens sensu lato) is listed as "vulnerable" on the IUCN Red List of Threatened Species.

== See also ==
- List of fungi by conservation status
