= Cystolepiota amazonica =

Scientific classification
- Domain: Eukaryota
- Kingdom: Fungi
- Division: Basidiomycota
- Class: Agaricomycetes
- Order: Agaricales
- Family: Agaricaceae
- Genus: Cystolepiota
- Species: C. amazonica

Binomial name
- Cystolepiota amazonica Singer (1989)

Species of fungus

Cystolepiota amazonica Mycological characteristics
- Gills on hymenium
- Cap is campanulate
- Hymenium is free or adnexed
- Stipe is bare
- Spore print is white
- Ecology is saprotrophic
- Edibility is unknown

Cystolepiota amazonica is a species of mushroom-producing fungus in the family Agaricaceae.

== Taxonomy ==
It was described in 1989 by the German mycologist Rolf Singer who classified it as Cystolepiota amazonica.

== Description ==
Cystolepiota amazonica is a very small brownish mushroom with white flesh.

Cap: 3mm wide and high and campanulate (bell shaped). The surface is redddish-brown to light chesnut colour. It is not hygrophanous or viscid ad is wrinkled (rugulose) or smooth with subsulcate striations at the margins. Gills: Free or narrowly adnexed, subconfluent. White but drying to pale or dirty brown. Stem: 1.2 cm tall and 0.8mm thick tapering slightly with a thinner apex. The surface is chestnut colour and smooth with white mycelium at the base. No stem ring was observed by Singer. Spores: Globose or subglobose. Dextrinoid, cyanophilic, hyaline, not metachromatic. 2.5-2.8 x 2-2.2μm. Basidia: 11–12.5 x 3.5-4.5 μm. Four spored. Smell: Indistinct.

== Habitat and distribution ==
The specimens studied by Singer were found growing solitary on fallen, rotting leaves of Dicotyledon plants in the tropical forests of Brazil, 30 km North of Manaus.
