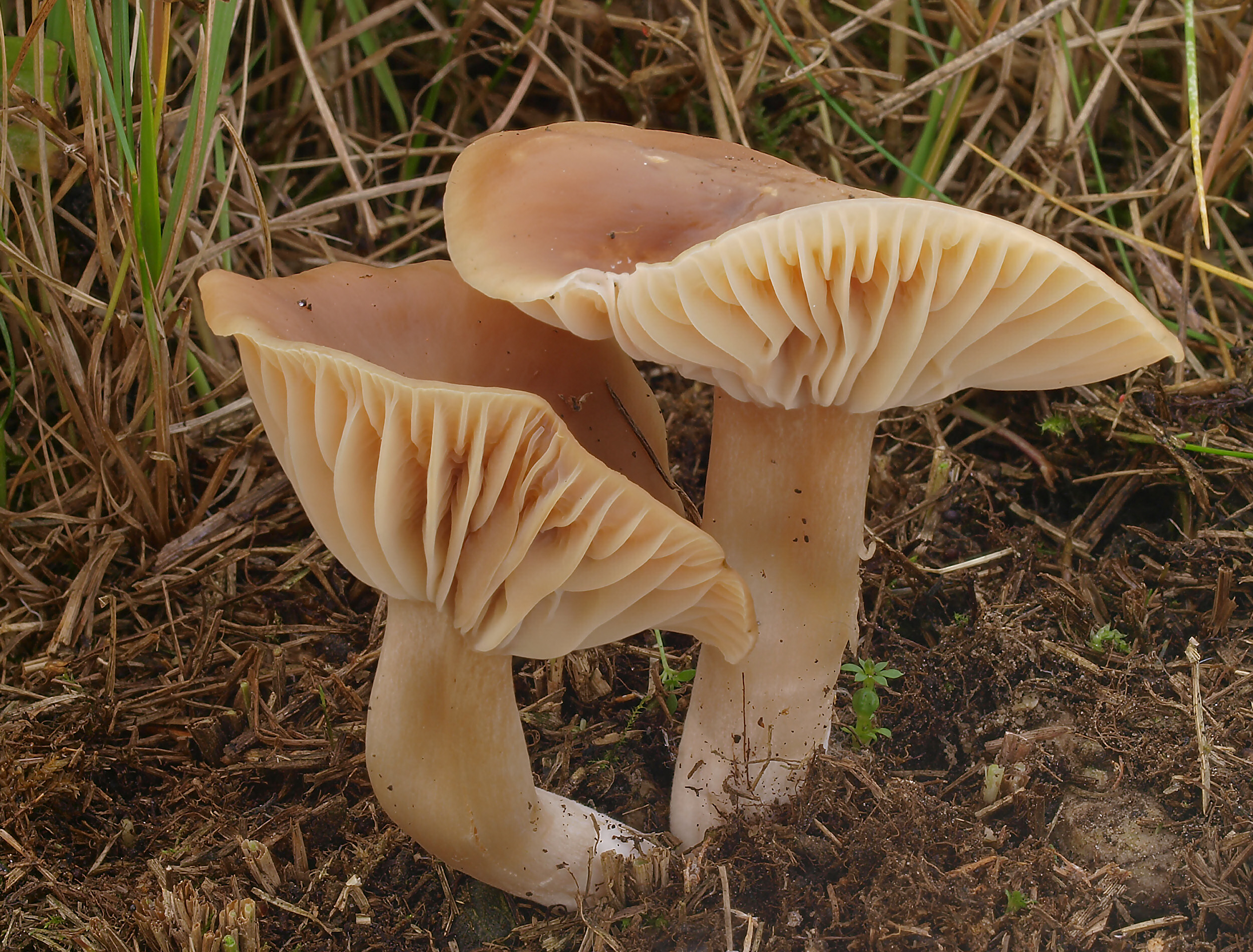

Conservation status
- Vulnerable (IUCN 3.1)

Scientific classification
- Kingdom: Fungi
- Division: Basidiomycota
- Class: Agaricomycetes
- Order: Agaricales
- Family: Hygrophoraceae
- Genus: Cuphophyllus
- Species: C. colemannianus

Binomial name
- Cuphophyllus colemannianus (A. Bloxam) Bon (1985)

Synonyms
- Hygrophorus colemannianus A. Bloxam (1854); Camarophyllus colemannianus (A. Bloxam) Ricken (1920); Hygrocybe colemanniana (A. Bloxam) P.D. Orton & Watling (1969)

= Cuphophyllus colemannianus =

toasted waxcap

Species of fungus

Cuphophyllus colemannianus is a species of agaric (gilled mushroom) in the family Hygrophoraceae. It has been given the recommended English name of toasted waxcap. The species has a European distribution, occurring mainly in agriculturally unimproved grassland. Threats to its habitat have resulted in the species being assessed as globally "vulnerable" on the IUCN Red List of Threatened Species.

== Taxonomy ==
The species was first described from Britain in 1854 by naturalist Andrew Bloxam as Hygrophorus colemannianus. It was transferred to the genus Cuphophyllus by the French mycologist Marcel Bon in 1985.

Recent molecular research, based on cladistic analysis of DNA sequences, has confirmed that Cuphophyllus colemannianus is a distinct species.

== Description ==
Basidiocarps are agaricoid, up to 50mm (2 in) tall, the cap hemispherical at first, becoming broadly convex to flat when expanded, up to 50mm (3 in) across. The cap surface is smooth, slightly greasy when damp, brown with paler margin. The lamellae (gills) are waxy, thick, decurrent (running down the stipe), white to pale buff. The stipe (stem) is smooth, white, lacking a ring. The spore print is white, the spores (under a microscope) smooth, inamyloid, ellipsoid, c. 7.5 to 9 by 5 to 6μm.

== Distribution and habitat ==
The Toasted Waxcap is widespread but generally rare throughout Europe. It is also known from Greenland. Like most other European waxcaps, Cuphophyllus colemannianus occurs in old, agriculturally unimproved, short-sward grassland (pastures and lawns), with a marked preference for calcareous sites.

Recent research suggests waxcaps are neither mycorrhizal nor saprotrophic but may be associated with mosses.

== Conservation ==
Cuphophyllus colemannianus is typical of waxcap grasslands, a declining habitat due to changing agricultural practices. As a result, the species is of global conservation concern and is listed as "vulnerable" on the IUCN Red List of Threatened Species. Cuphophyllus colemannianus also appears on the official or provisional national red lists of threatened fungi in several European countries, including Croatia, Czech Republic, Denmark, Finland, Germany, Norway, and Sweden.

== See also ==
- List of fungi by conservation status
