= Paecilomyces marquandii =

Scientific classification
- Domain: Eukaryota
- Kingdom: Fungi
- Division: Ascomycota
- Class: Eurotiomycetes
- Order: Eurotiales
- Family: Thermoascaceae
- Genus: Paecilomyces
- Species: P. marquandii

Binomial name
- Paecilomyces marquandii (Massee) S. Hughes (1951)

Synonyms
- Verticillium marquandii Massee (1898); Spicaria violacea E.V. Abbott (1926); Metarhizium marquandii (Massee) Kepler, Rehner & Humber (2014)

Species of fungus

Paecilomyces marquandii is a soil-borne filamentous fungus distributed throughout temperate to tropical latitudes worldwide including forest, grassland, sewage sludge and strongly metal polluted area characterized by high tolerance in heavy metals. Simultaneous toxic action of zinc and alachlor result an increase in uptake of metal in this fungus but disrupts the cell membrane. Paecilomyces marquandii is known to parasitize the mushroom, Cuphophyllus virgineus, in the family, Hygrophoraceae. Paecilomyces marquandii is categorised as a biosafety risk group 1 in Canada and is not thought to be a significant pathogen of humans or animals.

== History ==
The genus Verticillium was erected by British mycologist G.E. Massee in 1898 to accommodate Verticillium marquandii. This species was initially thought conspecific with Spicaria violacea based on its pattern of cell wall division. The fungus was transferred to the genus Paecilomyces as Paecilomyces marquandii by Canadian mycologist Stanley John Hughes in 1951 because of its morphological inconsistency with the emerging, modern concept of Verticillium Paecilomyces marquandii is often confused with Purpureocillium lilacinum because of their similar brownish-violet colony colors and bright yellow reverse pigmentation. In 2014, Metarhizium marquandii was introduced to accommodate this species, but it is considered a synonym.

== Growth and morphology ==
Paecilomyces marquandii is an anamorphic eurotiomycete. It forms brush-like conidiophores borne on thin-walled, hyaline, and smooth-walled stalks that reach lengths from 50 to 300 μm and 2.5 to 3 μm wide. Conidiophores of P. marquandii resemble those of the genus Penicillium where brush-like conidiophores terminate with phialides with swollen bases and tapered necks 8 to 15 μm long and 1.5 to 2 μm wide. Conidia are produced in connected chains consisting of smooth walled hyaline broadly ellipsoidal to spindle-shaped spores, 3 to 3.5 μm long and 2.2 μm wide. Single phialides are not associated with conidiophores but may arise on vegetative aerial hyphae. Globe to ellipsoid chlamydospores 3.5 μm in diameter may be produced submerged in the growth medium beneath the mycelium. No sexual state is known. Colonies are odorless.

Paecilomyces marquandii can grow at wide range of temperature from 5–30 °C (41–86 °F) with optimal growth at 25 °C but no growth above 37 °C. Temperature tolerance is a characteristic that distinguishes Paecilomyces marquandii from Purpureocillium lilacinum with the latter exhibiting growth above 37 °C. Colonies of P. marquandii grown on malt agar reach 5–7 cm in diameter in 14 days at 25 °C with a velvety, brownish-violet aerial mycelium occasionally producing short tufts of conidiophores called synnemata. Colonies begin as white becoming violet then dark vinaceous brown with bright yellow to orange yellow reverse at maturity. Optimal growth of P. marquandii occurs at a water potential of 45 bars. Growth is inhibited at atmospheric concentrations of carbon dioxide less than 3%. Paecilomyces marquandii exhibits antagonism towards Rhizoctonia solani and other fungi. However, it exerts stimulatory effects on some crop plants including corn.

== Physiology ==
Paecilomyces marquandii utilizes starch, gelatin, chitin, and nitrite. Cellulose decomposition is absent or very poor. Paecilomyces marquandii is characterised by high tolerance to metals such as zinc, copper and lead. This fungus is proficient at taking up minerals and heavy metals from soil particularly at high pH conditions, although very high concentrations of metals disrupt the cell membrane. This species is also able to take up and decompose the banned herbicide alachlor and break it down by nitrogen acetyl oxidation. P. marquandii produces highly active, specific keratinases. In presence of keratin chips with phosphate and magnesium ions, it forms large quantities of struvite crystals. Oxygen uptake of P. marquandii is reduced by saturated 8-11 carbon chain fatty acids as a sole carbon source but favoured by compounds with shorter or longer fatty acid chains. Optimum pH for P. marquandii growth is 5-6. It is sensitive to organic chemicals like carbon disulfide.

== Habitat and ecology ==
Paecilomyces marquandii has been isolated from soils in Netherlands, Austria, Czech Republic, Russia, United States, Canada, Spain, Turkey, Israel, Syria, Zaire, central Africa, the Ivory Coast, South Africa, India, Pakistan, Nepal, Jamaica, the Bahamas, Brazil, Central America, New Zealand, and Japan. It has been found in various types of soils including forest soils, under aspen forests, mixed hardwood with high humus accumulation, grasslands particularly in the upper soil layers, soils with steppe-type vegetation, arable and other cultivated soils down to a depth of 40 cm. This species has been found in agricultural fields treated with sewage sludge, in sewage sludge itself, streams with a lower degree of pollution, river sediments, estuarine slit, sand dunes, carst caves, and bat guano. It has been also isolated from pine litter, pine humus, peat, truffle grounds, roots of strawberry, the rhizosphere of corn, wheat, grasses, Beta vulgaris, and sugar cane and the rhizosphere of Lupinus angustifolius. Conidia of P. marquandii have been observed to germinate near roots of peas and radish. This effect is inhibited in the presence of the fungicide, miconazole.

== Human and animal disease ==
This species has been reported as an agent of cellulitis on the leg of an immunosuppressed kidney transplant patient receiving corticosteroid therapy. Successful control of disseminated P. marquandii infection was obtained with miconazole. The fungus has exhibited tolerance to amphotericin B and flucytosine. It is not thought to be a significant pathogen of humans or animals.
