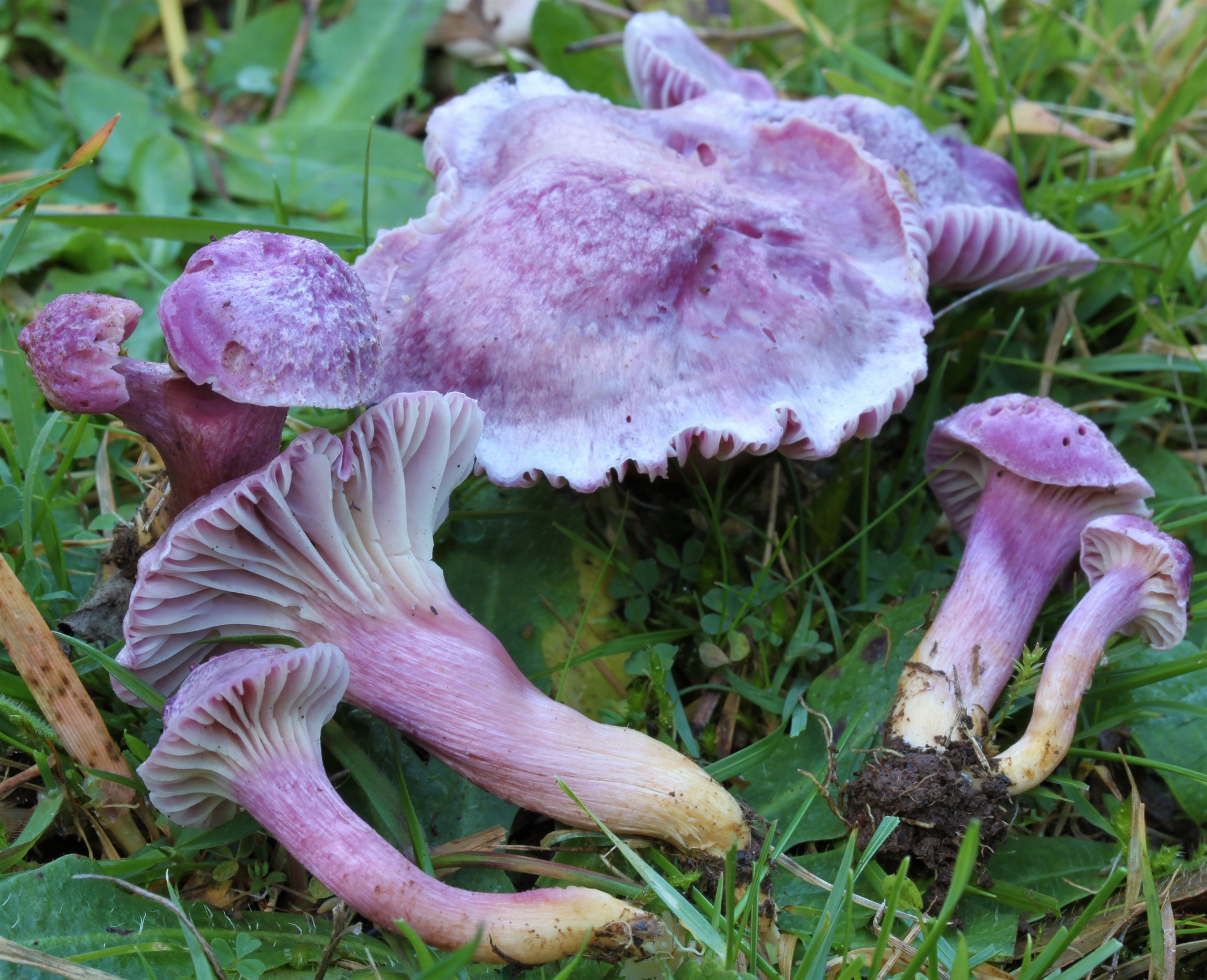

Scientific classification
- Domain: Eukaryota
- Kingdom: Fungi
- Division: Basidiomycota
- Class: Agaricomycetes
- Order: Agaricales
- Family: Hygrophoraceae
- Genus: Cuphophyllus
- Species: C. cheelii

Binomial name
- Cuphophyllus cheelii (A.M. Young) J.A. Cooper 2023

Synonyms
- Cantharellus lilacinus Cleland & Cheel (1919); Camarophyllus lilacinus (Cleland & Cheel) E.Horak (1990); Hygrocybe cheelii A.M.Young (1999)

= Cuphophyllus cheelii =

Species of fungus

Cuphophyllus cheelii is a species of fungus in the family Cantharellaceae. First described in 1919 by botanists John Burton Cleland and Edwin Cheel, the fungus is found in Australia.
