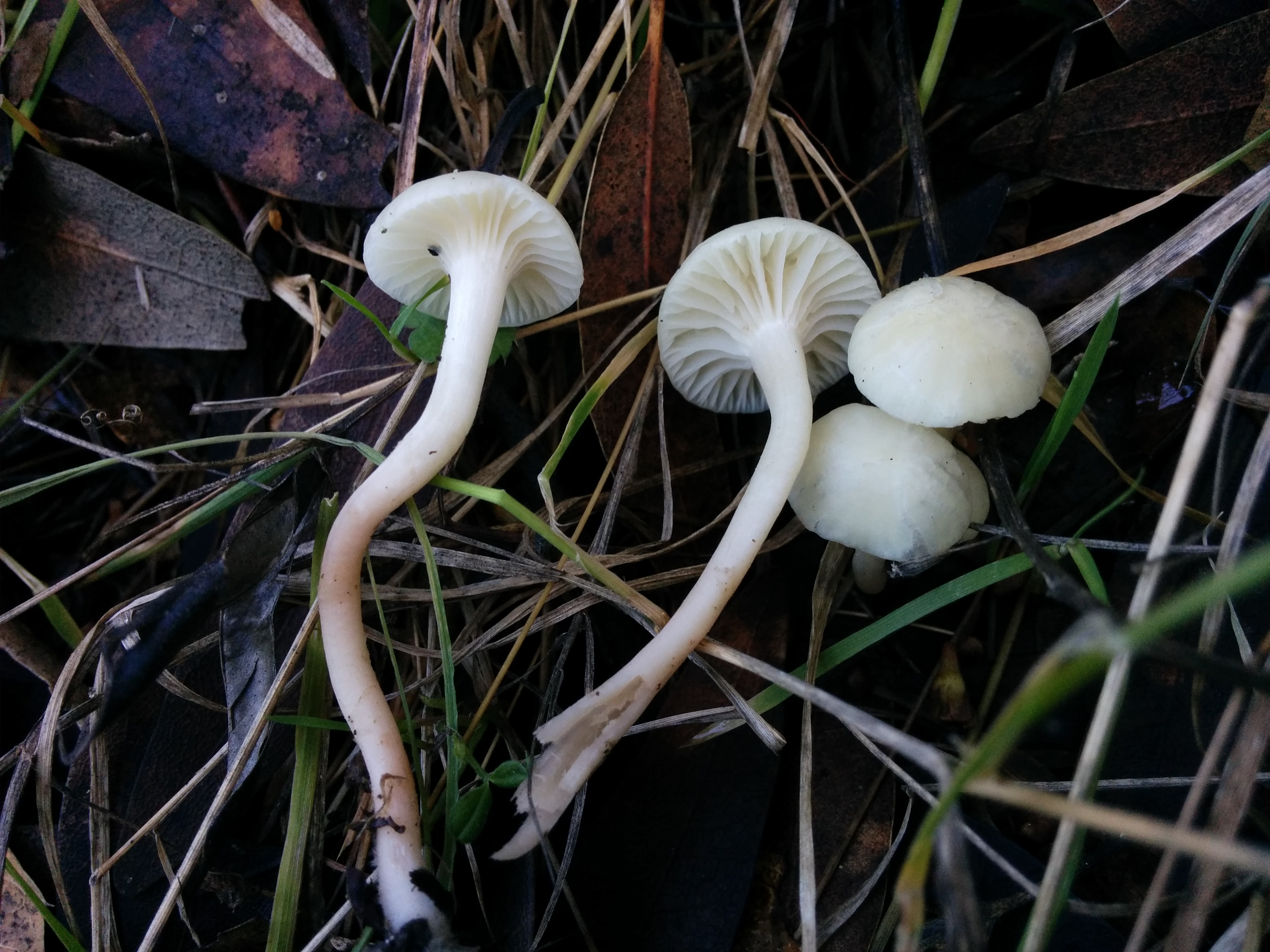

Scientific classification
- Kingdom: Fungi
- Division: Basidiomycota
- Class: Agaricomycetes
- Order: Agaricales
- Family: Hygrophoraceae
- Genus: Cuphophyllus
- Species: C. russocoriaceus

Binomial name
- Cuphophyllus russocoriaceus (Berk. & Jos.K. Mill.) Bon

Synonyms
- Hygrophorus russocoriaceus Berk. and Jos.K. Mill. Hygrophorus russocoriacea Berk. & T.K. Mill. Camarophyllus russocoriaceus (Berk. & T.K. Mill.) J.E. Lange

= Cuphophyllus russocoriaceus =

Species of fungus

Cuphophyllus russocoriaceus, commonly known as the cedar waxy cap, cedar-scented waxy cap, or cedarwood waxy cap, is a species of mushroom in the family Hygrophoraceae.

== Taxonomy ==
Cuphophyllus russocoriaceus was first described by Miles Joseph Berkeley and T.K. Miller in 1848 as Hygrophorus russocoriaceus. It was later transferred to the genus Cuphophyllus.

== Description ==
The cap of Cuphophyllus russocoriaceus is white in color, often with a yellowish or tannish tint in the center. It is about 1-3 centimeters in diameter and can be convex, flat, depressed, or umbonate. It is not slimy, but it is smooth. The stipe is about 4-10 centimeters long and 0.2-1 centimeters wide. It is whitish, though the base can become pinkish as the mushroom matures. The stipe can be fibrillose or smooth. The gills are white and decurrent, with a greasy texture. The spore print is white, and the spores are ellipsoid. Cuphophyllus russocoriaceus has a distinctive smell, reminiscent of cedar wood or Russian leather.

=== Similar species ===
Cuphophyllus russocoriaceus is similar to C. virgineus, but that species lacks the distinctive smell.

Cuphophyllus russocoriaceus
- Mycological characteristics
- Gills on hymenium
- Cap is convex or flat
- Hymenium is decurrent
- Stipe is bare
- Spore print is white
- Edibility is unknown

== Habitat and distribution ==
Cuphophyllus russocoriaceus is found in Europe and North America. However, the Pacific Northwest version is genetically distinct, and may be reclassified as a different species. In the Pacific Northwest, it is found in forests, where it often grows under western redcedar. In England and the Outer Hebrides, it often grows in grasslands.
