= Cuphophyllus lepidopus =

scalyfoot waxcap

Conservation status
- Vulnerable (IUCN 3.1)

Scientific classification
- Kingdom: Fungi
- Division: Basidiomycota
- Class: Agaricomycetes
- Order: Agaricales
- Family: Hygrophoraceae
- Genus: Cuphophyllus
- Species: C. lepidopus

Binomial name
- Cuphophyllus lepidopus (Rea) A.M. Ainsw. (2017)

Synonyms
- Hygrophorus lepidopus Rea (1927); Hygrocybe lepidopus (Rea) P.D. Orton & Watling (1969); Hygrocybe fornicata var. lepidopus (Rea) Boertm. & N. Barden (2007)

Species of fungus

Cuphophyllus lepidopus is a species of agaric (gilled mushroom) in the family Hygrophoraceae. It has been given the recommended English name of scalyfoot waxcap. The species has a European distribution, occurring mainly in agriculturally unimproved grassland. Threats to its habitat have resulted in the species being assessed as globally "vulnerable" on the IUCN Red List of Threatened Species.

== Taxonomy ==
The species was first described from England in 1927 by mycologist Carleton Rea as Hygrophorus lepidopus. It was known only by an illustration of Rea's collection until rediscovered in England in 2004. It was then considered a variety of Hygrocybe fornicata, but subsequent molecular research, based on cladistic analysis of DNA sequences, has indicated that Cuphophyllus lepidopus is a distinct species.

== Description ==
Basidiocarps are agaricoid, up to 100mm (4 in) tall, the cap broadly conical at first, becoming broadly convex when expanded, up to 75mm (3 in) across. The cap surface is slightly greasy when damp, cream with pale buff to greyish centre, wholly or partly speckled with fine brownish scales. The lamellae (gills) are waxy, thick, adnexed, white to cream. The stipe (stem) is whitish, speckled with fine brownish scales, lacking a ring. The spore print is white, the spores (under a microscope) smooth, inamyloid, broadly ellipsoid, c. 5.5 to 7.5 by 4 to 5 μm.

=== Similar species ===
The earthy waxcap Cuphophyllus fornicatus is very similar, but lacks scales on cap or stipe. The two species have been confused in the past and further research is required to distinguish them morphologically.

== Distribution and habitat ==
The scalyfoot waxcap is only known with certainty from England, but is presumed to be more widespread in Europe. Like most other European waxcaps, Cuphophyllus lepidopus occurs in old, agriculturally unimproved, short-sward grassland (pastures and lawns).

Recent research suggests waxcaps are neither mycorrhizal nor saprotrophic but may be associated with mosses.

== Conservation ==
Cuphophyllus lepidopus is typical of waxcap grasslands, a declining habitat due to changing agricultural practices. As a result, the species is of global conservation concern and is listed as "vulnerable" on the IUCN Red List of Threatened Species.

== See also ==
- List of fungi by conservation status
