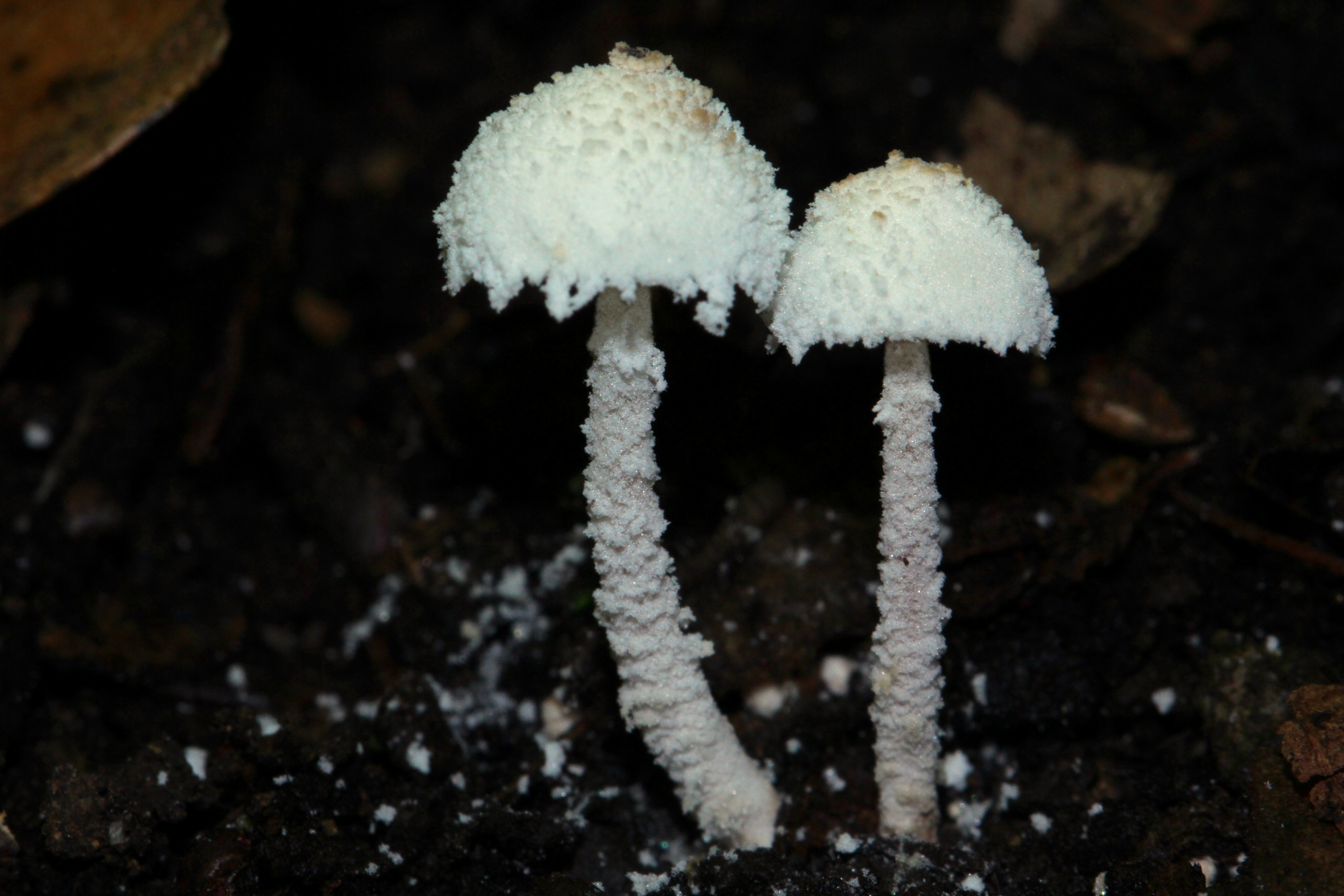
- Cystolepiota seminuda

Scientific classification
- Domain: Eukaryota
- Kingdom: Fungi
- Division: Basidiomycota
- Class: Agaricomycetes
- Order: Agaricales
- Family: Agaricaceae
- Genus: Cystolepiota; Singer (1952)

Type species
- Cystolepiota constricta Singer (1952)

Synonyms
- Pulverolepiota Bon (1993)

= Cystolepiota =

Genus of fungi

Cystolepiota is a genus of mushroom-forming fungi in the family Agaricaceae.

== Taxonomy ==
The genus was circumscribed by mycologist Rolf Singer in 1952, who originally included three species: C. brunneotingens, C. luteifolia, and the type species C. constricta.

== Species ==
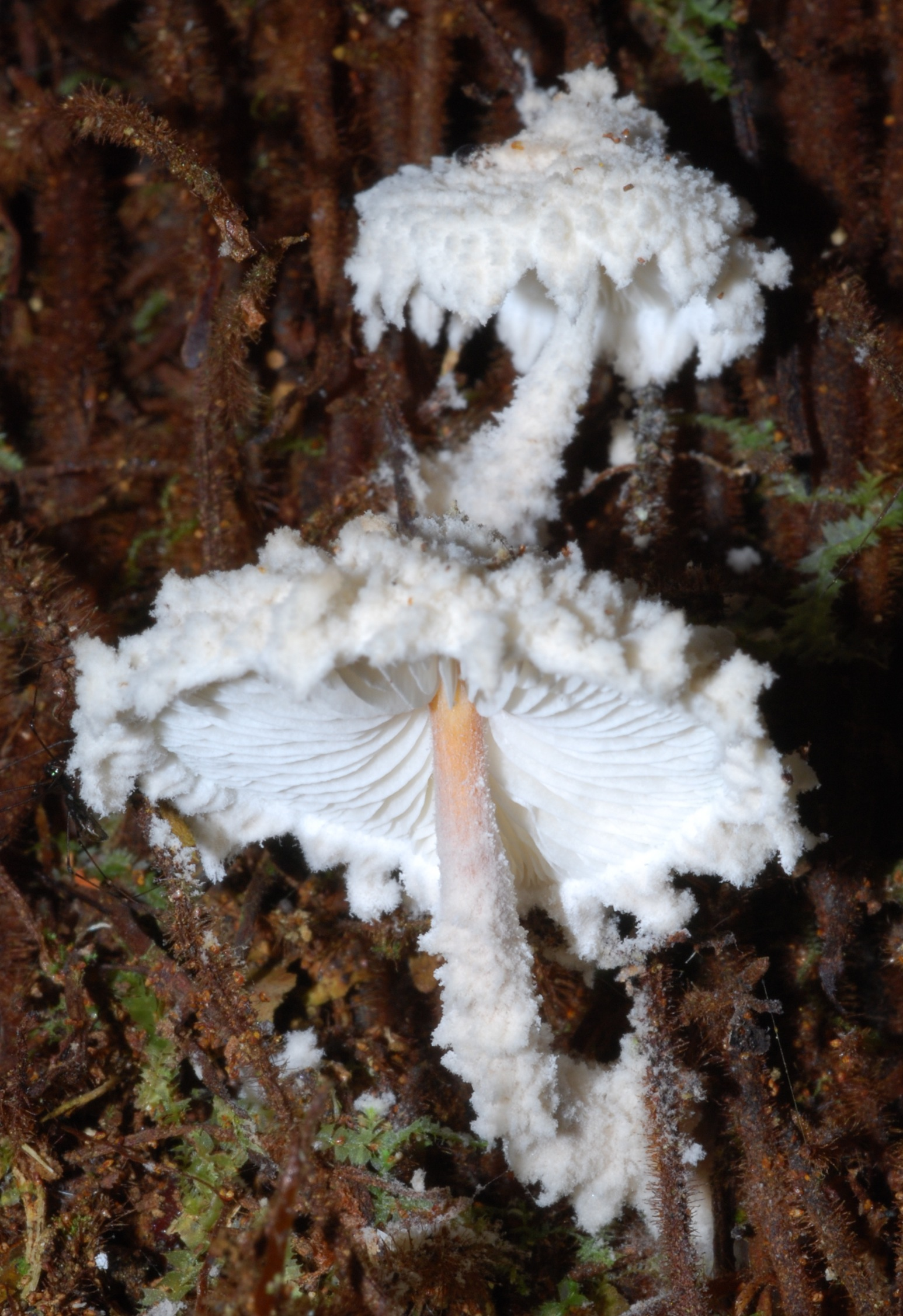
Cystolepiota mushrooms growing from the base of a native New Zealand tree fern Dicksonia fibrosa

As of January 2016, Index Fungorum lists 43 species in Cystolepiota:

- Cystolepiota adulterina (F.H.Møller) Bon (1976) – Great Britain
- Cystolepiota albogilva Singer (1989)
- Cystolepiota amazonica Singer (1989)
- Cystolepiota aurantica Singer (1973)
- Cystolepiota aureola Raithelh. (1985)
- Cystolepiota australis Singer (1969)
- Cystolepiota brunneotingens Singer (1952)
- Cystolepiota bucknallii (Berk. & Broome) Singer & Clémençon (1972)
- Cystolepiota cinereofusca Singer (1982)
- Cystolepiota constricta Singer (1952)
- Cystolepiota cystophora (Malençon) Bon (1976)
- Cystolepiota eriophora (Peck) Knudsen (1978)
- Cystolepiota fumosifolia (Murrill) Vellinga (2006)
- Cystolepiota furfuracea T.K.A.Kumar & Manim. (2009) – India
- Cystolepiota hemisclera (Berk. & M.A.Curtis) Pegler (1983)
- Cystolepiota hetieri (Boud.) Singer (1973)
- Cystolepiota hetieriana Locq.) Bresinsky & H.Haas (1976)
- Cystolepiota hispida (Gillet) Bon (1977)
- Cystolepiota icterina F.H.Møller ex Knudsen (1978)
- Cystolepiota luteifolia Singer (1952)
- Cystolepiota luteohemisphaerica (Dennis) I.Saar & Læssøe (2008)
- Cystolepiota luteophylla (Sundb.) Knudsen (1978)
- Cystolepiota marthae Singer (1969)
- Cystolepiota microspora (Murrill) Singer & Clémençon (1973)
- Cystolepiota moelleri Knudsen (1978)
- Cystolepiota ompnera (Berk. & Broome) Pegler (1986)
- Cystolepiota oregonensis (H.V.Sm.) Vellinga (2006)
- Cystolepiota petasiformis (Murrill) Vellinga (2006)
- Cystolepiota potassiovirens Singer (1989)
- Cystolepiota pseudogranulosa (Berk. & Broome) Pegler (1986)
- Cystolepiota pulverulenta (Huijsman) Vellinga (1992)
- Cystolepiota pumanquensis Singer (1971)
- Cystolepiota purpureoconia (G.F.Atk.) Bon (1993)
- Cystolepiota pusilla (Nezdojm.) Wasser (1985)
- Cystolepiota pusillomyces (Peck) Redhead (1987)
- Cystolepiota rosea Singer (1969)
- Cystolepiota rubra Singer (1952)
- Cystolepiota sacchariolens Nonis (1983)
- Cystolepiota seminuda (Lasch) Bon (1976)
- Cystolepiota sinopica (Romagn.) Bon (1981)
- Cystolepiota sistrata (Fr.) Singer ex Bon & Bellù (1985)
- Cystolepiota subadulterina Bon (1976)
- Cystolepiota violaceogrisea (Rick) Singer (1973)
