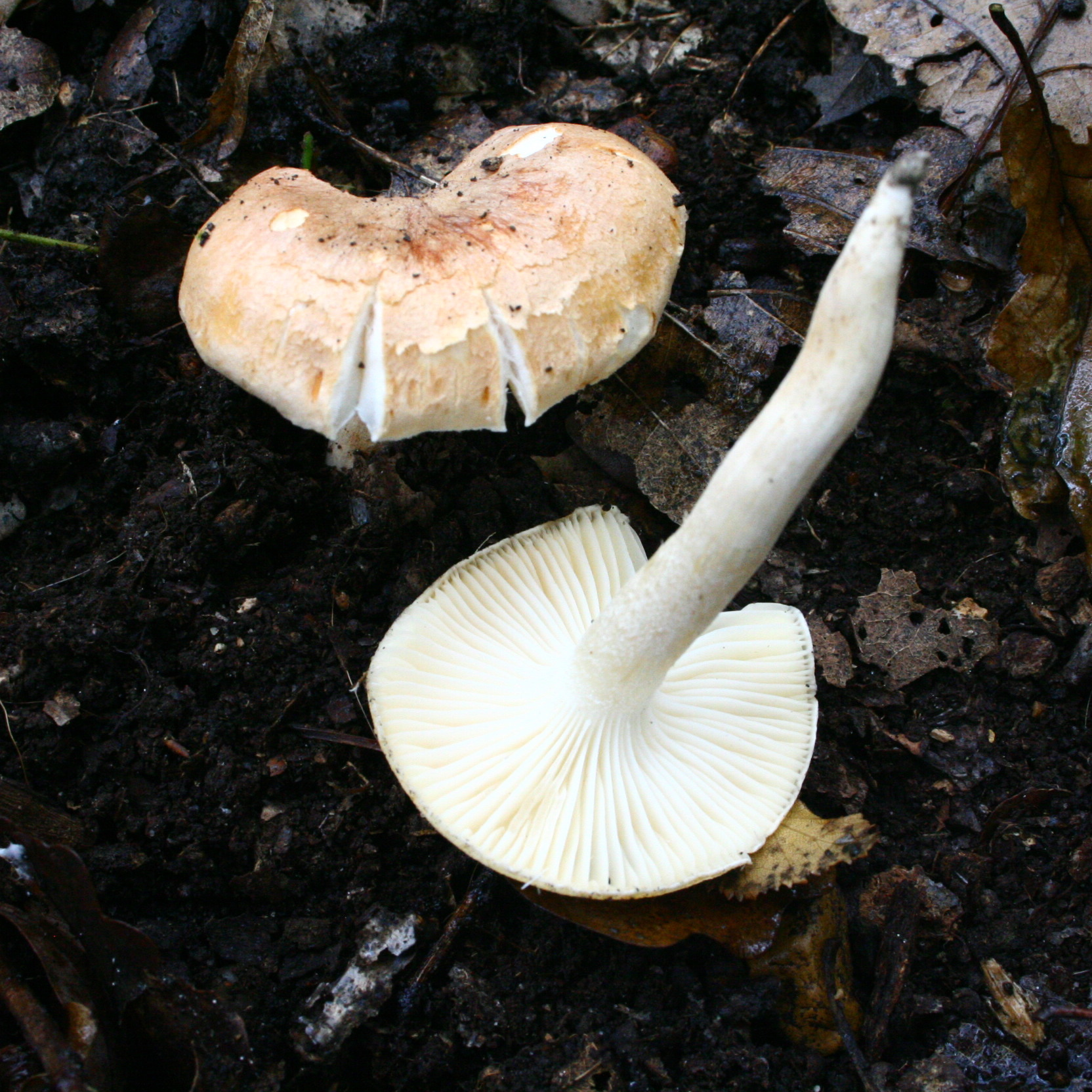

Scientific classification
- Domain: Eukaryota
- Kingdom: Fungi
- Division: Basidiomycota
- Class: Agaricomycetes
- Order: Agaricales
- Family: Hygrophoraceae
- Genus: Hygrophorus
- Species: H. nemoreus

Binomial name
- Hygrophorus nemoreus (Pers.) Fr. (1838)

Synonyms
- Agaricus nemoreus Pers. (1801); Camarophyllus nemoreus (Pers.) P. Kumm. (1871)

= Hygrophorus nemoreus =

Species of fungus

Hygrophorus nemoreus is an edible species of fungus in the genus Hygrophorus.
