= Marcel Bon =

English botanist

- Born: 17 March 1925; Picardy
- Died: 11 May 2014 (aged 89); Woincourt
- Scientific career
- Fields: Fungi
- Author abbrev. (botany): Bon

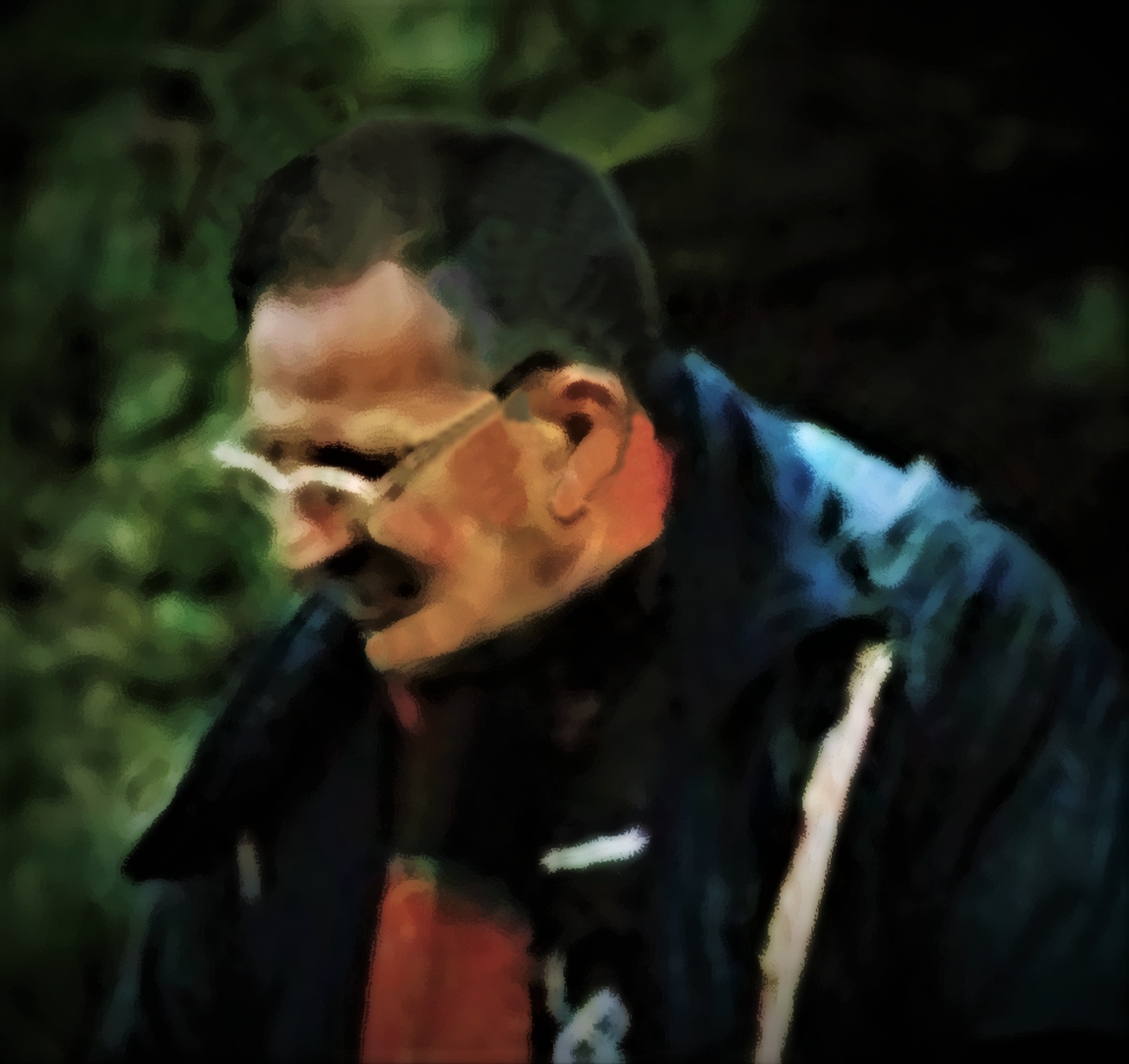
Marcel Bon

Marcel Bon (1925 – 2014) was one of France's best known field mycologists. He was born in Picardy in 1925 and came to mycology through general botany, and pharmacology. He lived at Saint-Valery-sur-Somme, a small town on the mouth of the river Somme, in Picardy, Northern France, which was a former artists' and writers' retreat.

In 1987, along with two artists (John Wilkinson, and Denys Ovenden) he produced a comprehensive field guide for mycologists, The Mushrooms and Toadstools of Britain and North-western Europe. His other skills were as a pianist, an artist, and a skier.

== Bibliography ==
- The Mushrooms and Toadstools of Britain and North Western Europe, Bon M., (1987) pub. Hodder and Stoughton.
  - ISBN 0 340 39935 X (paperback)
  - ISBN 0 340 39953 8 (hardback).
- Les tricholomes de France et d'Europe occidentale, Bon. M, (1984) pub. Lechevalier (Paris).
- Fungorum Rariorum Icones Coloratae, Part 15 Corinarius, Bon. M, (1986) pub. Lubrecht & Cramer Ltd.
- Collins Pocket Guide; Mushrooms and Toadstools of Britain and North-Western Europe (Paperback), (2004) pub. HarperCollins Canada.

== List of fungi taxons dedicated to Marcel Bon ==
- Agaricus bonii Wasser, Doc. Mycol. 25 (n°98/100): 470 (1995).
- Cortinarius bonii Bidaud, Moënne-Locc. & Reumaux, in Bidaud et al., Atlas des Cortinaires 11: 571 (2001).
- Echinoderma bonii C.E. Hermos. & Jul. Sánchez, Est. Mus. Cienc. Nat. de Alava, Ser. Micol. 14: 83 (1999).
- Leucoagaricus bonii A. Caball., in Bon & Caballero, Doc. Mycol. 27 (n° 106): 40 1997).
- Lyophyllum bonii Contu, Doc. Mycol. 26 (n° 102): 67 (1996).
- Marasmiellus bonii Segedin, Doc. Mycol. 25 (n° 98/100): 438 (1995).
- Peziza pseudoammophila var. bonii Donadini, Riousset & G. Riousset, in Donadini, Bull. Soc. linn. Provence 30: 60 (« 1977 », publ. 1978).
- Ramaria bonii Estrada, Doc. Mycol. 25 (n° 98/100): 168 (1995).
- Russula bonii Buyck, Doc. Mycol. 25 (n° 98/100): 107 (1995).
- Tricholoma bonii Basso & Candusso, Doc. Mycol. 27 (n° 107): 64 (1997).

== See also ==
- List of mycologists
