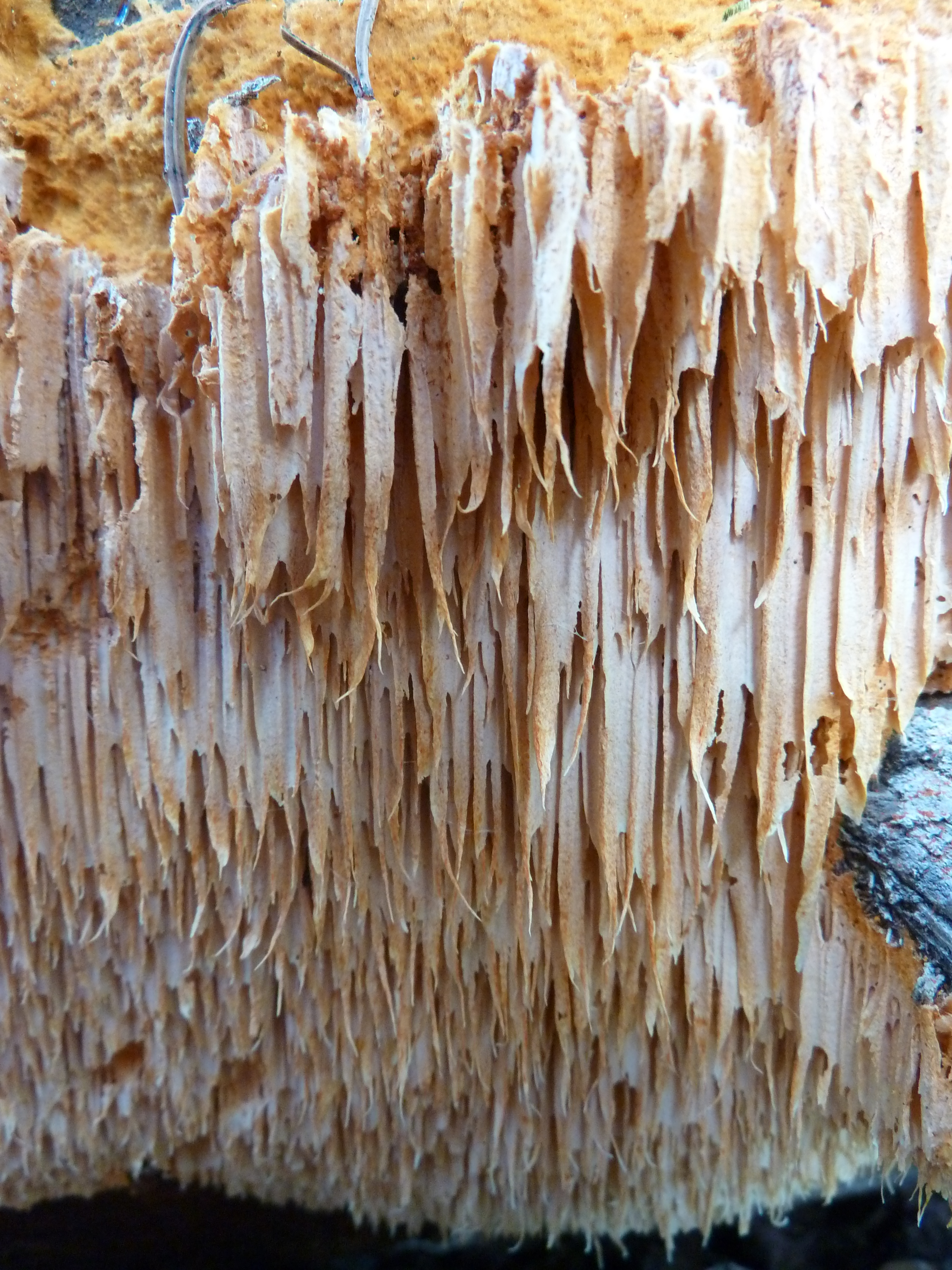

Scientific classification
- Kingdom: Fungi
- Division: Basidiomycota
- Class: Agaricomycetes
- Order: Polyporales
- Family: Fomitopsidaceae
- Genus: Pycnoporellus
- Species: P. alboluteus

Binomial name
- Pycnoporellus alboluteus (Ellis & Everh.) Kotl. & Pouzar (1963)

Synonyms
- Fomes alboluteus Ellis & Everh. (1895); Polyporus alboluteus (Ellis & Everh.) Ellis & Everh. (1898); Scindalma alboluteum (Ellis & Everh.) Kuntze (1898); Aurantiporellus alboluteus (Ellis & Everh.) Murrill (1905); Aurantiporus alboluteus (Ellis & Everh.) Murrill (1905); Phaeolus alboluteus (Ellis & Everh.) Pilát (1937); Hapalopilus alboluteus (Ellis & Everh.) Bondartsev & Singer (1941)

= Pycnoporellus alboluteus =

Species of fungus

Pycnoporellus alboluteus, commonly known as the orange sponge polypore, is a species of polypore fungus in the family Fomitopsidaceae. The soft, spongy orange fruit bodies grow spread out on the surface of fallen logs. Mature specimens have tooth-like or jagged pore edges.

Distributed throughout the boreal conifer zone, the fungus is found in mountainous regions of western North America and in Europe. It causes a brown cubical rot of conifer wood, especially spruce, but also fir and poplar. A snowbank mushroom, it can often be found growing on logs or stumps protruding through melting snow.

Several species of beetles use the fungus as a food source. Its edibility to humans is unknown.

== Taxonomy ==
The species was originally described as Fomes alboluteus by Job Bicknell Ellis and Benjamin Matlack Everhart in 1895. Collected by botanist Charles Spencer Crandall, the type specimens were found growing on the charred trunks of Abies subalpina in the mountains of Colorado, at an elevation of 3,000 metres (10,000 ft). In its taxonomic history, it has been transferred to several genera. The original authors moved it to Polyporus in 1898, considering it allied to Polyporus leucospongia. They also noted that the pores developed teeth-like elongations like those of genus Irpex. Other generic transfers include Scindalma by Otto Kuntze in the same year, Aurantiporellus by William Alphonso Murrill in 1895, Aurantiporus by Murrill in 1905, Phaeolus by Albert Pilát in 1937, and Hapalopilus by Appollinaris Semenovich Bondartsev and Rolf Singer in 1943. It was given its current name in 1963 when Czech mycologists František Kotlaba and Zdeněk Pouzar placed it in Pycnoporellus.

The generic name Pycnoporellus is Ancient Greek for "with countless pores". The specific epithet alboluteus is a combination of the Latin words for "white" and "yellow". Curtis Gates Lloyd did not approve of the name, opining:

I hardly see how Ellis could have given it a worse name if he had tried, for it is neither "white" nor "yellow", but orange as Ellis described it. The young growth may possibly be white, but not when developed.

The fungus is commonly known as the "orange sponge polypore".

== Description ==
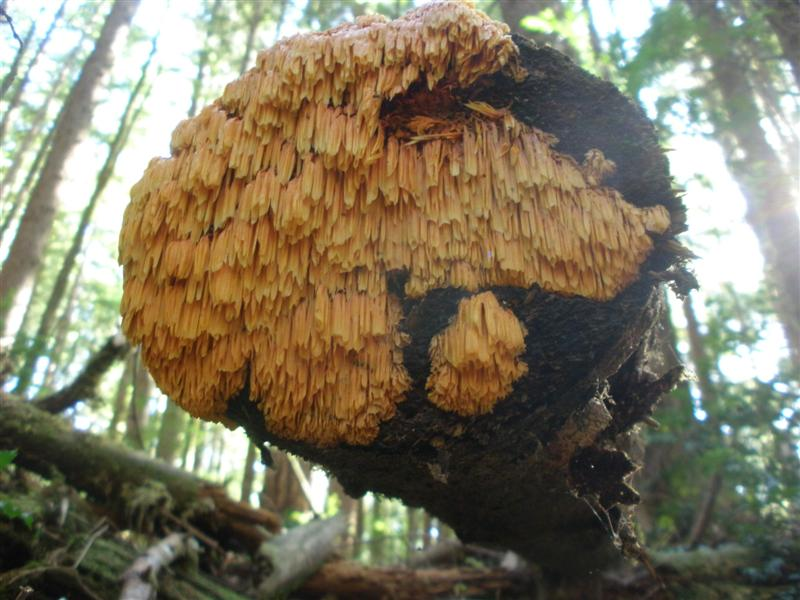
The fruit bodies, which grow spread out on the surface of the substrate, can be readily removed in large sheets.

The fruit bodies of P. alboluteus are annual, and are resupinate; they can be spread out on the substrate surface for up to 1 m (3 1/2 ft). Fresh fruit bodies are bright orange, finely grooved, and have a soft and spongy upper surface. The pore surface is orange with angular pores that are usually larger than 1 mm in diameter. It features thin partitions that split to form a teeth-like layer. The flesh is soft and pale orange, up to 2 mm thick, with a felt-like texture. The tubes are the same color as the pores, and continuous with the flesh, measuring up to 2 cm (3/4 in) thick. Bruised pores sometimes turn black. All tissues of the fungus turn bright red if a drop of dilute potassium hydroxide is applied. Fresh fruit bodies retain considerable moisture and can be squeezed of liquid like a sponge. The fruit body can be readily removed in large sheets from the wood it grows on. The edibility of the fruit body is unknown. It has a fragrant odor.

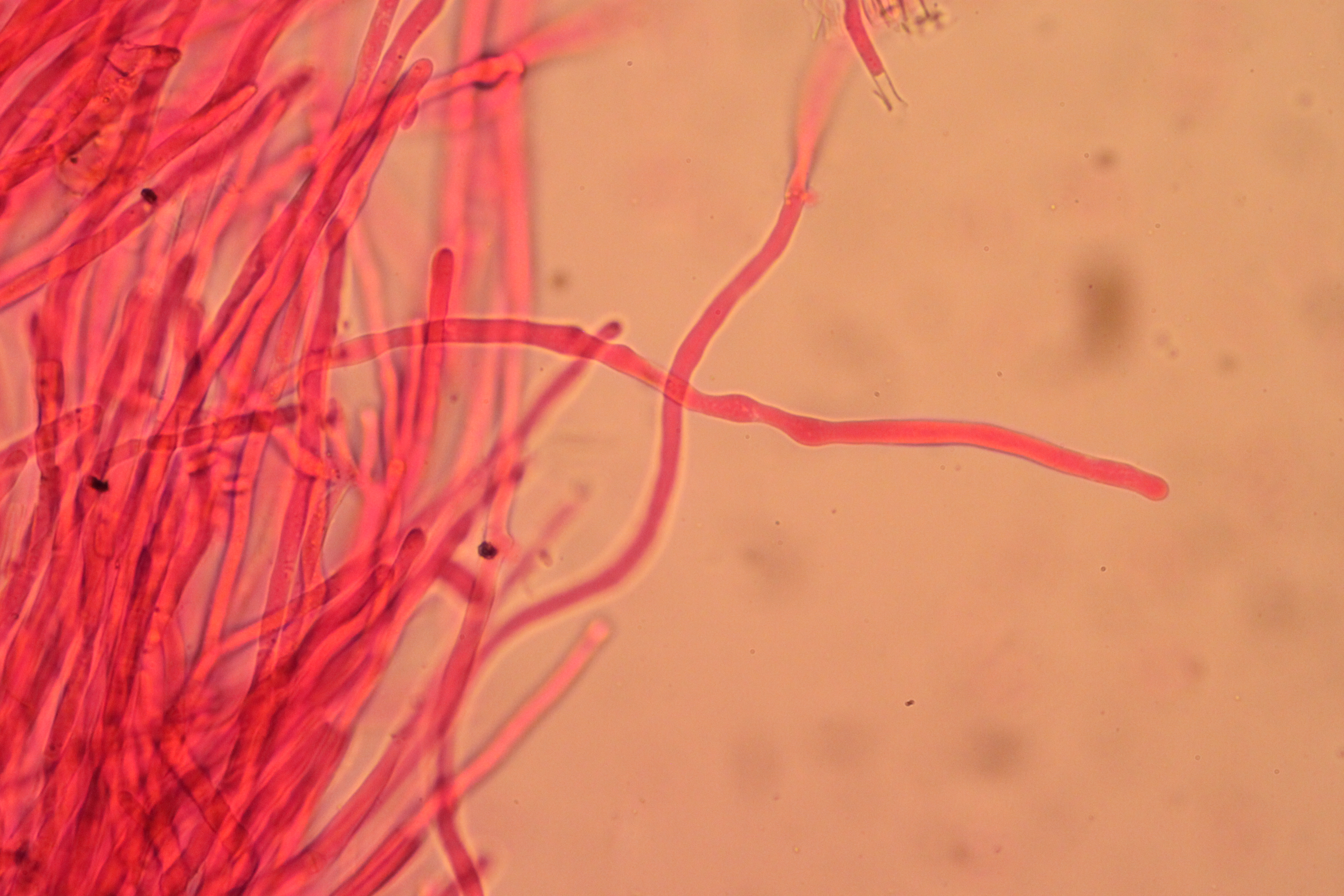
The hyphae are monomitic and lack clamps.

In deposit, the spores are white. The spores are cylindrical, smooth, hyaline (translucent), inamyloid, and measure 9–12 by 3–3.5 μm. Pycnoporellus alboluteus has a monomitic hyphal system, meaning it is made of generative hyphae, which are thin-walled, branched, and narrow. Hyphae in the flesh layer are thin- to thick-walled, frequently branched, and measure 2–10 μm in diameter, while those of the pores are roughly similar in morphology, but measure 3–5 μm. Both forms have a thin incrustation on their walls that gives them a rough appearance when viewed with a light microscope. The hymenium (spore-bearing tissue layer) is 40–60 μm thick, and has abundant cystidia, which are hyaline, and measure 7–9 μm in diameter. They are cylindrical, thin-walled to moderately thick-walled, hyaline, have a septum at the base, and measure 60–120 by 5–10 μm. The basidia (spore-bearing cells) are club-shaped, four-spored, and have dimensions of 25–35 by 6–7 μm.

=== Similar species ===
Lookalikes

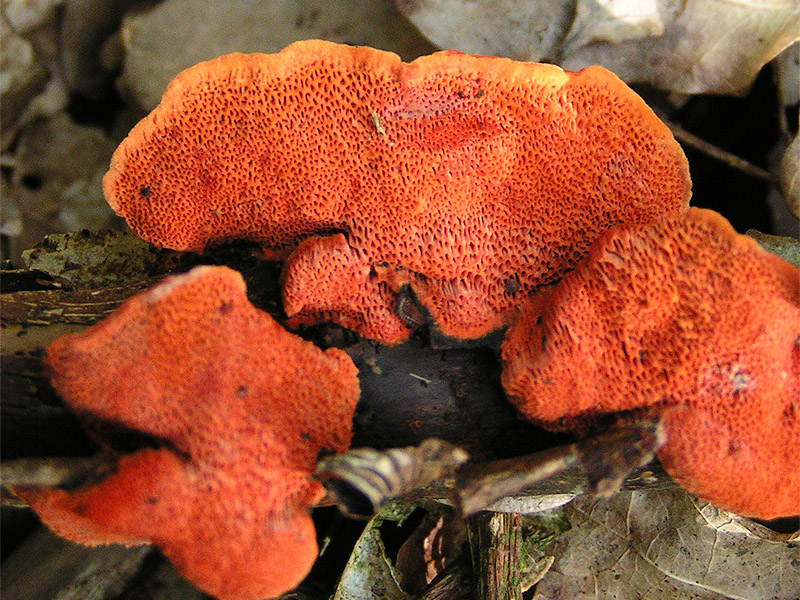
Pycnoporus cinnabarinus

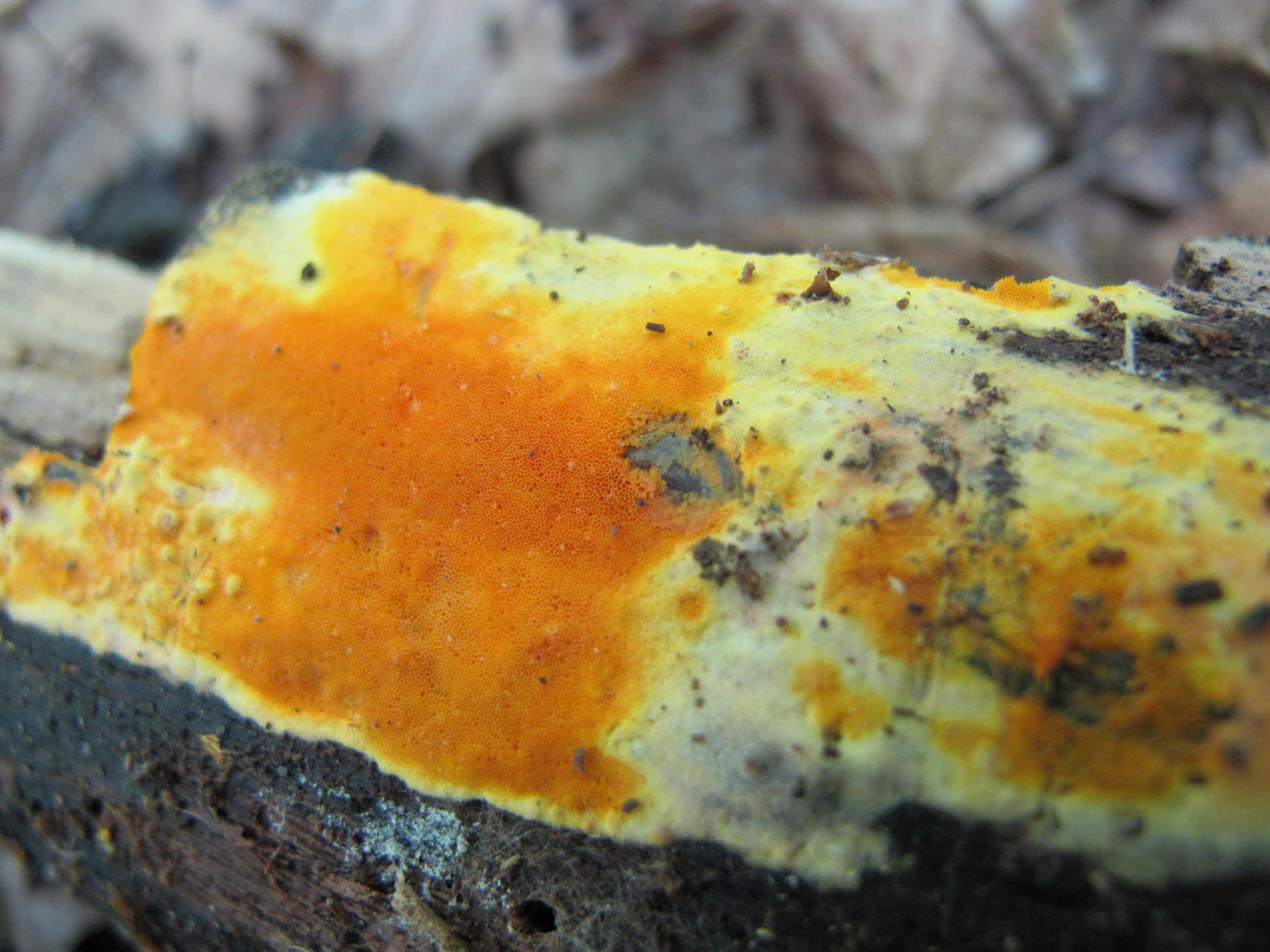
Ceriporia spissa

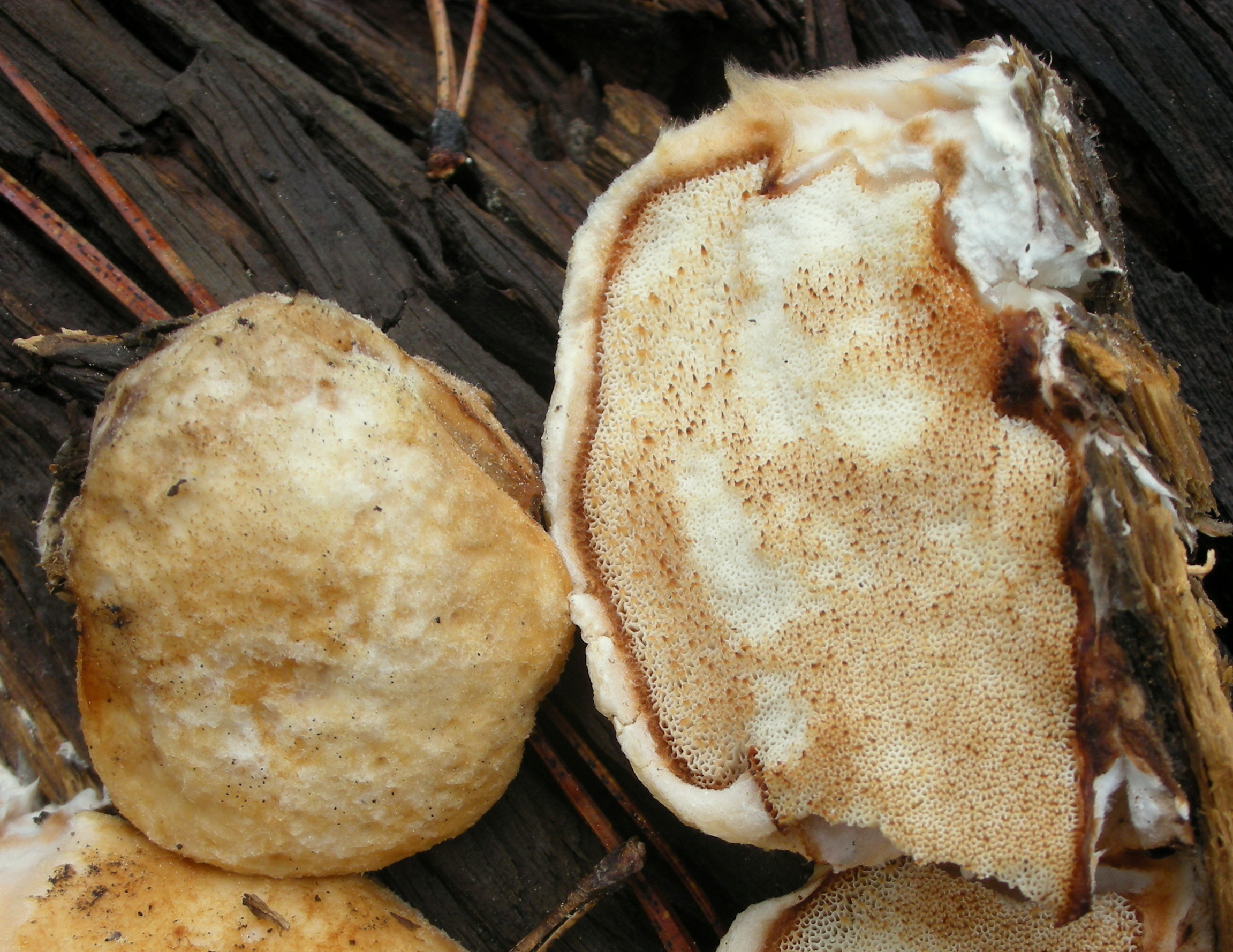
Oligoporus leucospongia

Field characteristics used to identify Pycnoporellus alboluteus include its orange color, toothlike pore edges, and the soft texture of its flesh. Other reddish-colored polypores with which Pycnoporellus alboluteus can be confused include Polyporus alboluteus, P. fibrillosus, and P. cinnabarinus. They can be distinguished by the size of their pores: P. alboluteus has pores that measure 1–3 mm, those of P. fibrillosus are 1–2 per mm, while those of P. cinnabarinus are 2–4 per mm. The shelf-like fruit bodies of Pycnoporellus fulgens have distinct caps, smaller pores measuring 0.3–0.5 mm, and less tendency to be pulled away from the substrate in sheets. Oligoporus leucospongia is another snowbank fungus that prefers downed conifer logs. It can be distinguished from P. alboluteus by its whitish cottony upper surface. Another orange fungus, Ceriporia spissa, is tightly appressed to the wood substrate, with a soft, gelatinous body texture.

== Ecology, habitat and distribution ==
Pycnoporellus alboluteus causes a brown cubical rot on fallen logs of coniferous trees. The fruit bodies usually grow on the underside of the log, and may start developing while still immersed in snow. Although new fruit bodies usually begin growing in the spring, they may persist throughout the year. In Europe, it usually grows on Picea species, but also on Abies. In North America, it also grows on Populus. The fungus has a circumpolar distribution, and is found in the boreal conifer zone, particularly in the montane zone, 2,400–3,000 m (8,000–10,000 ft). In North America, the fruit bodies begin growth under snow in the spring, continuing until midsummer, while in Europe, it is usually encountered in autumn. It is abundant in the Rocky Mountain region of North America, but rare in the eastern United States and Canada. As a timberline fungus subject to high altitudes, the fruit bodies are subjected to bright light, high winds, and low relative humidity, all of which have a drying effect. They counteract these extremes by absorbing water quickly, and drying slowly.

In Europe, it is one of 32 threatened species proposed for protection under the Bern Convention. It has been recorded from Czechoslovakia, and Poland, where it is mostly found in old-growth forests. It is rare in northern Europe, where it has been found in Finland growing on Picea abies and Alnus incana, and in Sweden.

In North America, the fruit bodies of the fungus serve as a food source for the rove beetle species Scaphisoma castaneum, the pleasing fungus beetle species Dacne cyclochilus, and minute tree-fungus beetles, including Octotemnus laevis.
