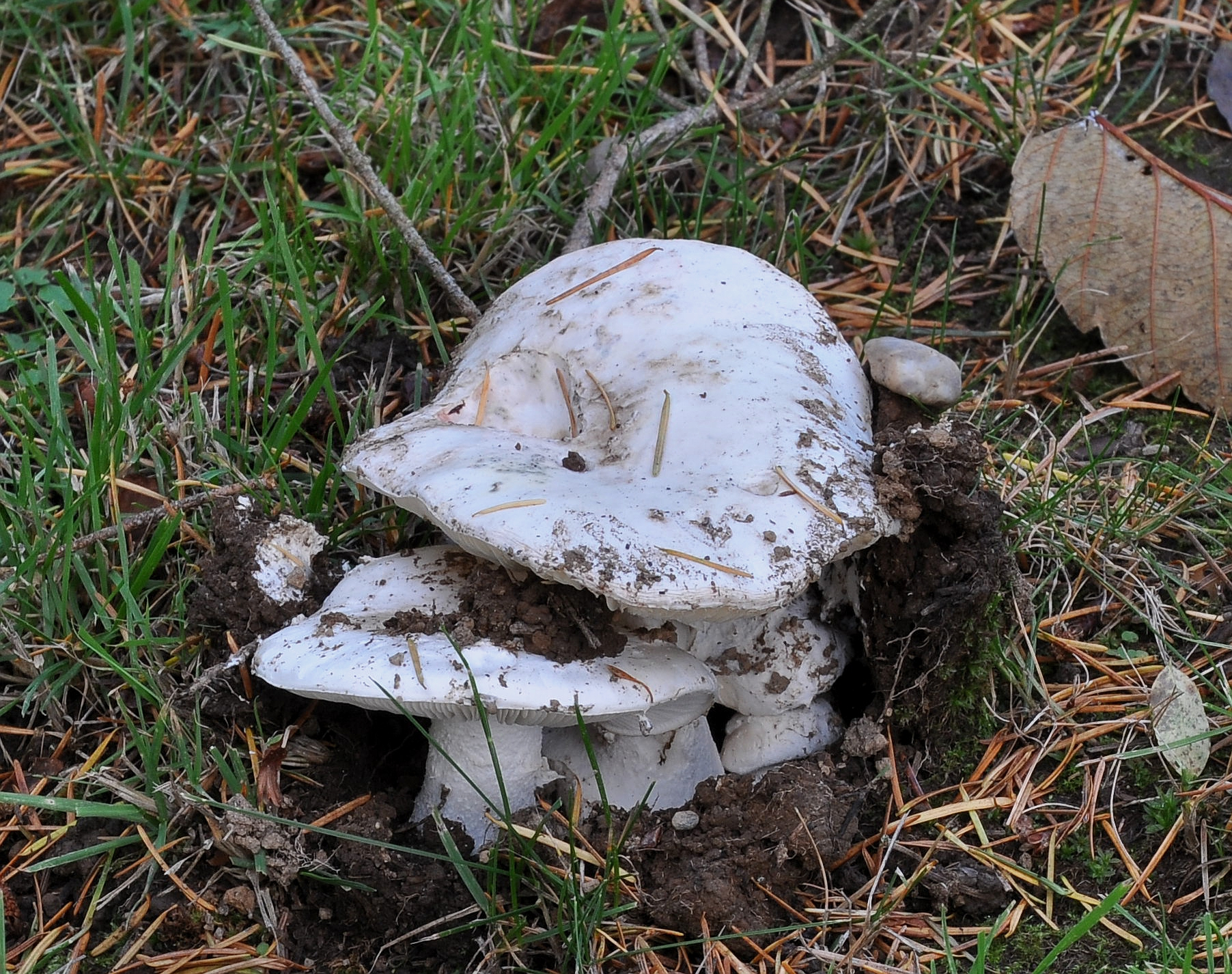

Conservation status
- Secure (NatureServe)

Scientific classification
- Domain: Eukaryota
- Kingdom: Fungi
- Division: Basidiomycota
- Class: Agaricomycetes
- Order: Russulales
- Family: Russulaceae
- Genus: Russula
- Species: R. brevipes

Binomial name
- Russula brevipes Peck (1890)

Synonyms
- Russula brevipes var. acrior Shaffer (1964); Russula brevipes var. megaspora Shaffer (1964)

= Russula brevipes =

Species of fungus

Russula brevipes Mycological characteristics
- Gills on hymenium
- Cap is flat or infundibuliform
- Hymenium is decurrent
- Stipe is bare
- Spore print is white
- Ecology is mycorrhizal
- Edibility is edible

Russula brevipes is a species of mushroom commonly known as the short-stemmed russula or the stubby brittlegill. The fruit bodies are white and large, with convex to funnel-shaped caps measuring 7–30 cm (3–12 in) wide set atop a thick stipe up to 8 cm (3 in) long. The gills on the cap underside are closely spaced and sometimes have a faint bluish tint. The spores are roughly spherical and have a network-like surface dotted with warts. Forms of the mushroom that develop a bluish band at the top of the stipe are sometimes referred to as variety acrior.

Fruiting from summer to autumn, the mushrooms often develop under masses of leaves or conifer needles in a mycorrhizal association with trees from several genera, including fir, spruce, Douglas-fir, and hemlock. It is widespread in North America, and was reported from Pakistan in 2006. Although edible, the mushrooms have a bland or bitter flavor. They become more palatable once parasitized by the ascomycete fungus Hypomyces lactifluorum, a bright orange mold that covers the fruit body and transforms them into lobster mushrooms.

== Taxonomy ==
Russula brevipes was initially described by American mycologist Charles Horton Peck in 1890, from specimens collected in Quogue, New York. It is classified in the subsection Lactaroideae, a grouping of similar Russula species characterized by having whitish to pale yellow fruit bodies, compact and hard flesh, abundant lamellulae (short gills), and the absence of clamp connections. Other related Russula species with a similar range of spore ornamentation heights include Russula delica, R. romagnesiana, and R. pseudodelica.

There has been considerable confusion in the literature over the naming of Russula brevipes. Some early 20th-century American mycologists referred to it as Russula delica, although that fungus was described from Europe by Elias Fries with a description not accurately matching the North American counterparts. Fries's concept of R. delica included: a white fruit body that did not change color; a smooth, shiny cap; and thin, widely spaced gills. To add to the confusion, Rolf Singer and later Robert Kühner and Henri Romagnesi described other species they named Russula delica. Robert Shaffer summarized the taxonomic conundrum in 1964:

Russula delica is a species that everybody knows, so to speak, but the evidence indicates that R. delica sensu Fries (1838) is not R. delica sensu Singer (1938), which in turn is not R. delica sensu Kühner and Romagnesi (1953)… It is best to use R. brevipes for the North American collections which most authors but not Kühner and Romagnesi (1953), call R. delica. The name, R. brevipes, is attached to a type collection, has a reasonably explicit original description, and provides a stable point about which a species concept can be formed.

Shaffer defined the Russula brevipes varieties acrior and megaspora in 1964 from Californian specimens. The former is characterized by a greenish-blue band that forms at the top of the stipe, while the latter variety has large spores. The nomenclatural database Index Fungorum does not consider these varieties to have independent taxonomical significance. In a 2012 publication, mycologist Mike Davis and colleagues suggest that western North American Russula brevipes comprise a complex of at least four distinct species. According to MycoBank, the European species Russula chloroides is synonymous with R. brevipes, although Index Fungorum and other sources consider them distinct species.

The specific epithet brevipes is derived from the Latin words brevis "short" and pes "foot", hence "short-footed". Common names used to refer to the mushroom include short-stemmed russula, short-stalked white russula, and stubby brittlegill.

== Description ==
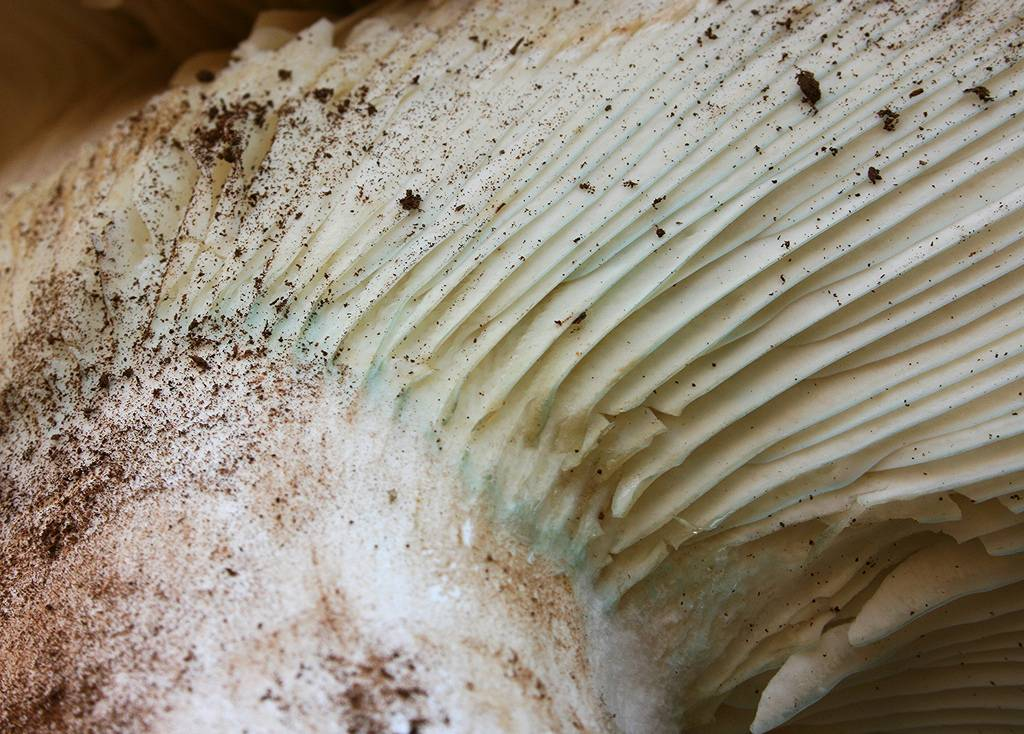
A greenish band can develop at the top of the stipe.

Fully grown, the cap can range from 7 to 30 cm (3 to 12 in) in diameter, whitish to dull-yellow, and is funnel-shaped with a central depression. The gills are narrow and thin, decurrent in attachment, nearly white when young but becoming pale yellow to buff with age, and sometimes forked near the stipe. The stipe is 3–8 cm long and 2.5–4 cm thick. It is initially white but develops yellowish-brownish discolorations with age. The mushroom sometimes develops a pale green band at the top of the stipe. The spore print is white to light cream.

The spores of R. brevipes are egg-shaped to more or less spherical, and measure 7.5–10 by 6.5–8.5 μm; they have a partially reticulate (network-like) surface dotted with warts measuring up to 1 μm high. The cap cuticle is arranged in the form of a cutis (characterized by hyphae that run parallel to the cap surface) comprising interwoven hyphae with rounded tips. There are no cystidia on the cap (pileocystidia).

The variant R. brevipes var. acrior Shaffer has a subtle green shading at the stipe apex and on the gills. R. brevipes var. megaspora has spores measuring 9–14 by 8–12 μm.

=== Similar species ===
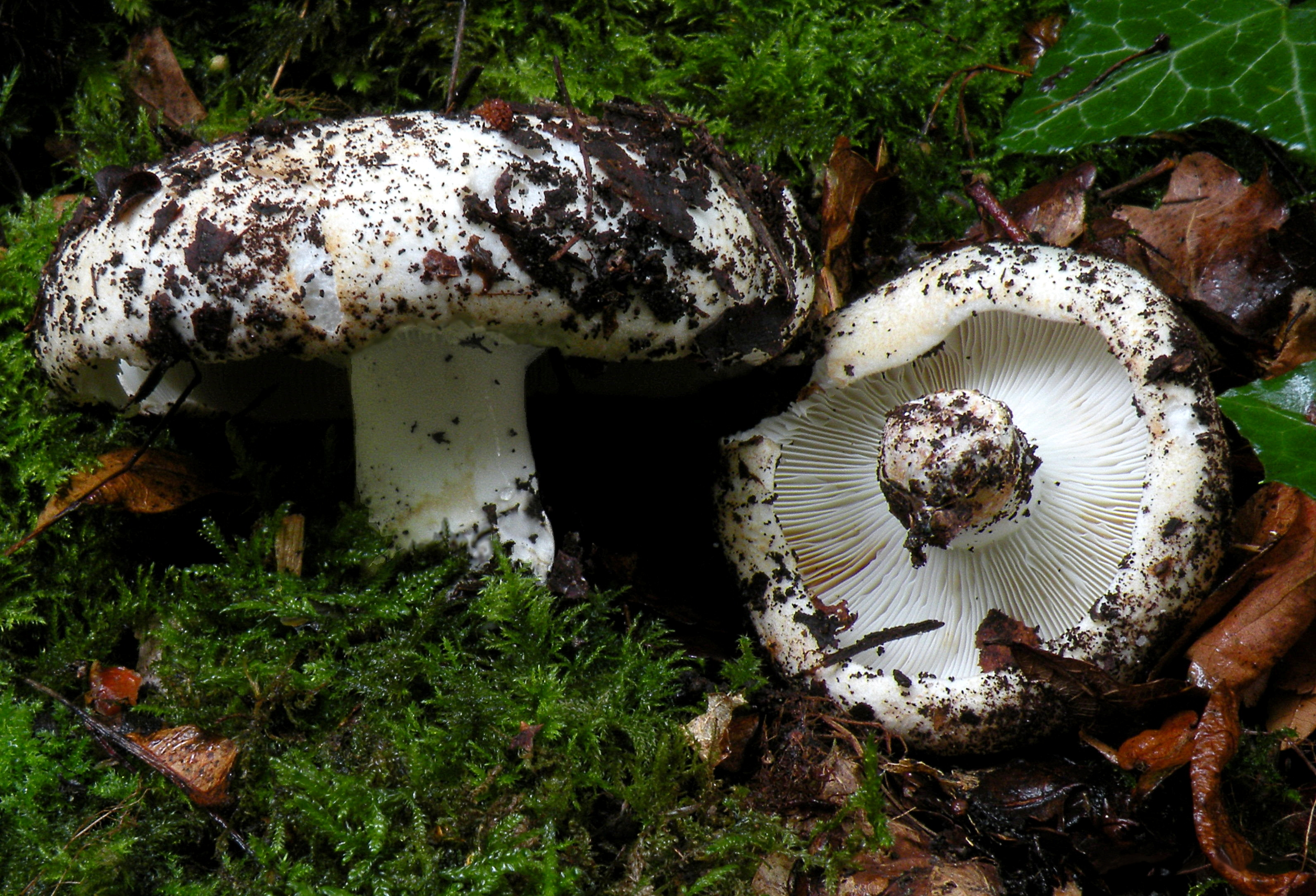
Russula delica is one of several look-alikes.

The subalpine waxy cap (Hygrophorus subalpinus) is somewhat similar in appearance to R. brevipes but lacks its brittle flesh, and it has a sticky, glutinous cap. The Pacific Northwest species Russula cascadensis also resembles R. brevipes, but has an acrid taste and smaller fruit bodies. Another lookalike, R. vesicatoria, has gills that often fork near the stipe attachment. R. angustispora is quite similar to R. brevipes, but has narrower spores measuring 6.5–8.5 by 4.5–5 μm, and it does not have the pale greenish band that sometimes develops in the latter species. The European look-alike R. delica is widely distributed, although rarer in the northern regions of the continent. Similar to R. brevipes in overall morphology, it has somewhat larger spores (9–12 by 7–8.5 μm) with a surface ornamentation featuring prominent warts interconnected by a zebra-like patterns of ridges. The milk-cap mushroom Lactifluus piperatus can be distinguished from R. brevipes by the production of latex when the mushroom tissue is cut or injured.

== Distribution and habitat ==
It is a common ectomycorrhizal fungus associated with several hosts across temperate forest ecosystems. Typical hosts include trees in the genera Abies, Picea, Pseudotsuga, and Tsuga. The fungus has been reported in Pakistan's Himalayan moist temperate forests associated with Pinus wallichiana. Fruit bodies grow singly or in groups; fruiting season occurs from summer to autumn. It appears from July to October in eastern North America, and from October to January in western North America (most abundantly in late autumn). The mushrooms are usually found as "shrumps"—low, partially emerged mounds on the forest floor, and have often been partially consumed by mammals such as rodents or deer.

Studies have demonstrated that geographically separated R. brevipes populations (globally and continentally) develop significant genetic differentiation, suggesting that gene flow between these populations is small. In contrast, there was little genetic differentiation observed between populations sampled from a smaller area (less than about 1,000 metres or 3,300 feet). R. brevipes is one of several Russula species that associates with the myco-heterotrophic orchid Limodorum abortivum.

== Edibility ==
"Although attractive when clean and crisp, this harmless, prolific mushroom is constantly maligned because it mimics prized edibles such as the white matsutake and forms promising 'shrumps' like those of the king bolete and chanterelle."

— David Arora

Russula brevipes is a non-descript edible species that tends to assume the flavors of meats and sauces it is cooked with. It is one of several Russula species harvested in the wild from Mexico's Iztaccíhuatl–Popocatépetl National Park and sold in local markets in nearby Ozumba. The mushrooms are suitable for pickling due to their crisp texture.

Fruit bodies are commonly parasitized by the ascomycete fungus Hypomyces lactifluorum, transforming them into an edible known as a lobster mushroom. In this form, the surface of the fruit body develops into a hard, thin crust dotted with minute pimples, and the gills are reduced to blunt ridges. The flesh of the mushroom—normally brittle and crumbly—becomes compacted and less breakable. Mycologist David Arora wrote that R. brevipes is "edible, but better kicked than picked".

=== Bioactive compounds ===
Sesquiterpene lactones are a diverse group of biologically active compounds that are being investigated for their antiinflammatory and antitumor activities. Some of these compounds have been isolated and chemically characterized from Russula brevipes: russulactarorufin, lactarorufin-A, and 24-ethyl-cholesta-7,22E-diene-3β,5α,6β-triol.

== See also ==
- List of Russula species
