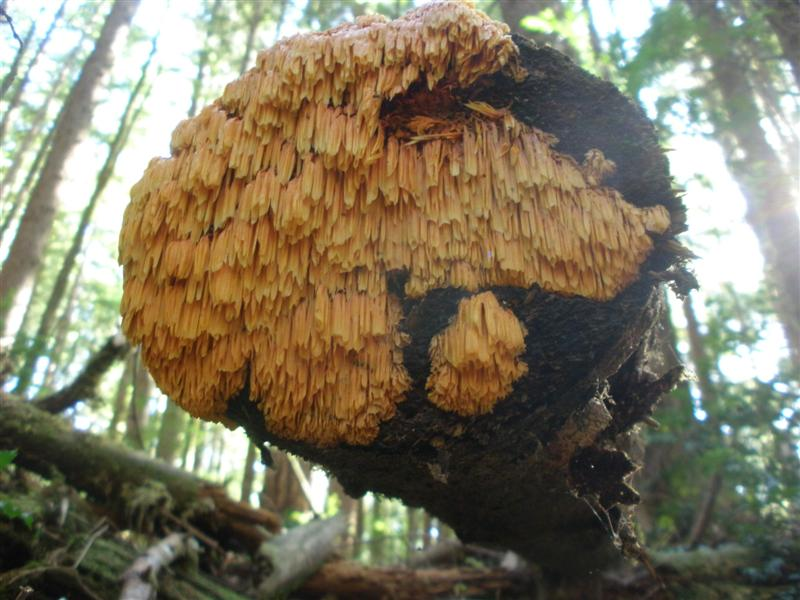
- Pycnoporellus alboluteus

Scientific classification
- Kingdom: Fungi
- Division: Basidiomycota
- Class: Agaricomycetes
- Order: Polyporales
- Family: Fomitopsidaceae
- Genus: Pycnoporellus; Murrill (1905)

Type species
- Pycnoporellus fibrillosus (P.Karst.) Murrill (1905)

Species
- P. alboluteus P. fulgens

Synonyms
- Aurantiporellus Murrill (1905)

= Pycnoporellus =

Genus of fungi

Pycnoporellus is a genus of fungi in the family Fomitopsidaceae. The widespread genus, circumscribed by American mycologist William Alphonso Murrill in 1905, contains two species.
