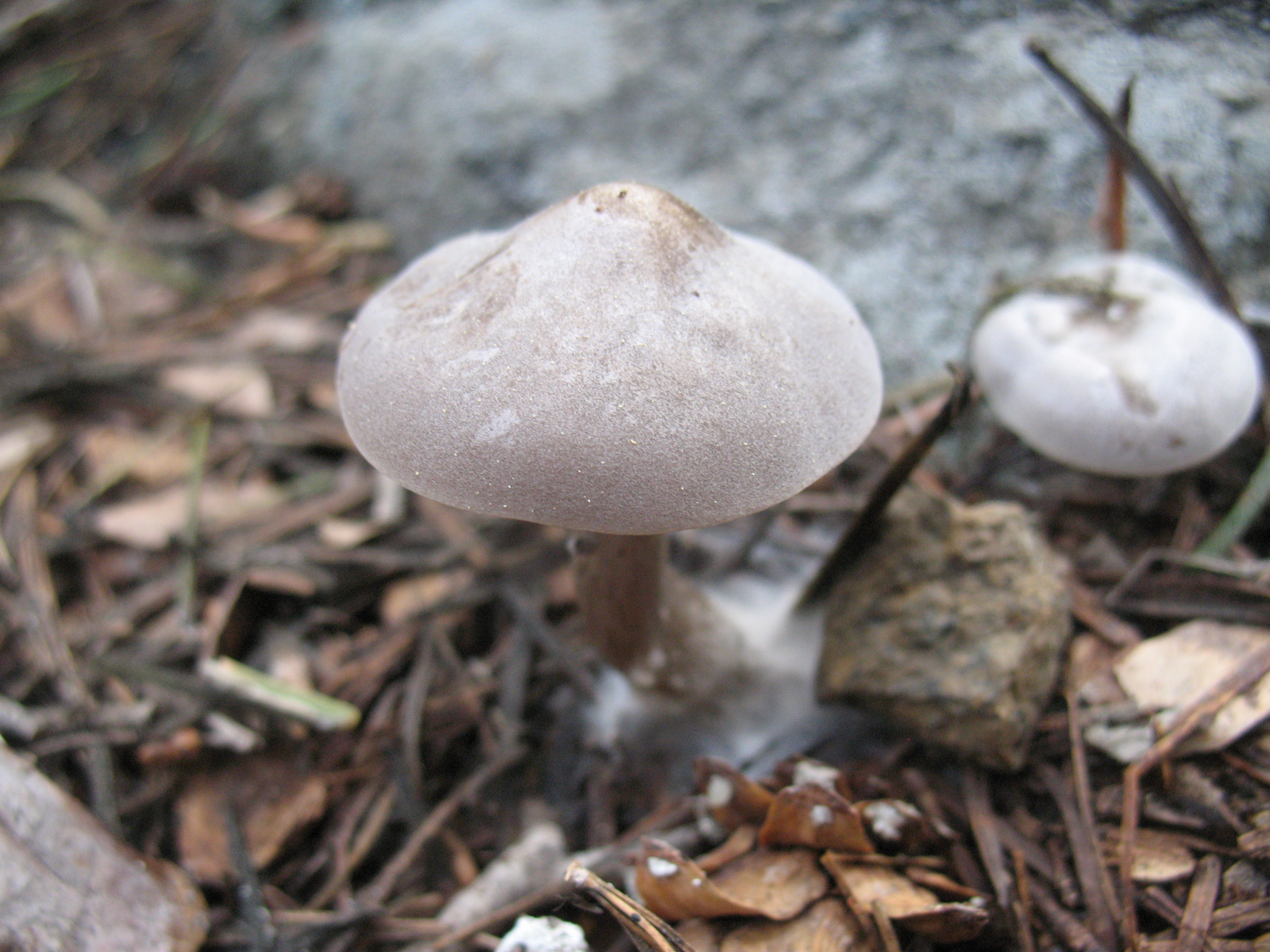

Scientific classification
- Kingdom: Fungi
- Division: Basidiomycota
- Class: Agaricomycetes
- Order: Agaricales
- Family: Clitocybaceae
- Genus: Clitocybe
- Species: C. glacialis

Binomial name
- Clitocybe glacialis Redhead et al.

Synonyms
- Lyophyllum montanum A.H. Sm.

= Clitocybe glacialis =

Species of fungus

Clitocybe glacialis is a species of mushroom in the family Tricholomataceae. Formerly known as Lyophyllum montanum, this is a snowbank mushroom, always associated with melting snow along snowbanks and thus glacialis. Originally described by Alexander H. Smith in 1957, this North American species is typically found growing under conifers on mountains.

== Taxonomy ==
The original specimen was collected in the Medicine Bow Mountains in Wyoming by mycologist Harry D. Thiers. In 1957, Alexander H. Smith, who had received the specimen from Thiers, described it as Lyophyllum montanum, placing it in the genus Lyophyllum because of its dark gray color and gills that became ash-gray (cinereous) with age. However, it later became clear that this species lacked siderophilous granules—iron-absorbing particles that darken when heated in acetocarmine—a trait characteristic of other Lyophyllum species. For this reason, Redhead et al. in 2000 moved the species to the genus Clitocybe as C. glacialis (C. montana already being used). They speculated that the dark pigmentation may be an adaptation to protect against the higher levels of ultraviolet radiation present in their montane environments.

Clitocybe glacialis
- Mycological characteristics
- Gills on hymenium
- Cap is convex
- Hymenium is adnate or adnexed
- Stipe is bare
- Spore print is white
- Ecology is saprotrophic
- Edibility is unknown

== Description ==
Fruiting bodies produced by this fungus have caps that are 2 to 6.5 cm (3/4 to 2 1/2 in) in diameter; the shape is convex to flattened. The cap surface is initially a silvery-gray (defined as canescent), but becomes yellow or yellow-brown with age. Younger specimens may have a whitish surface bloom which may slough off in age.

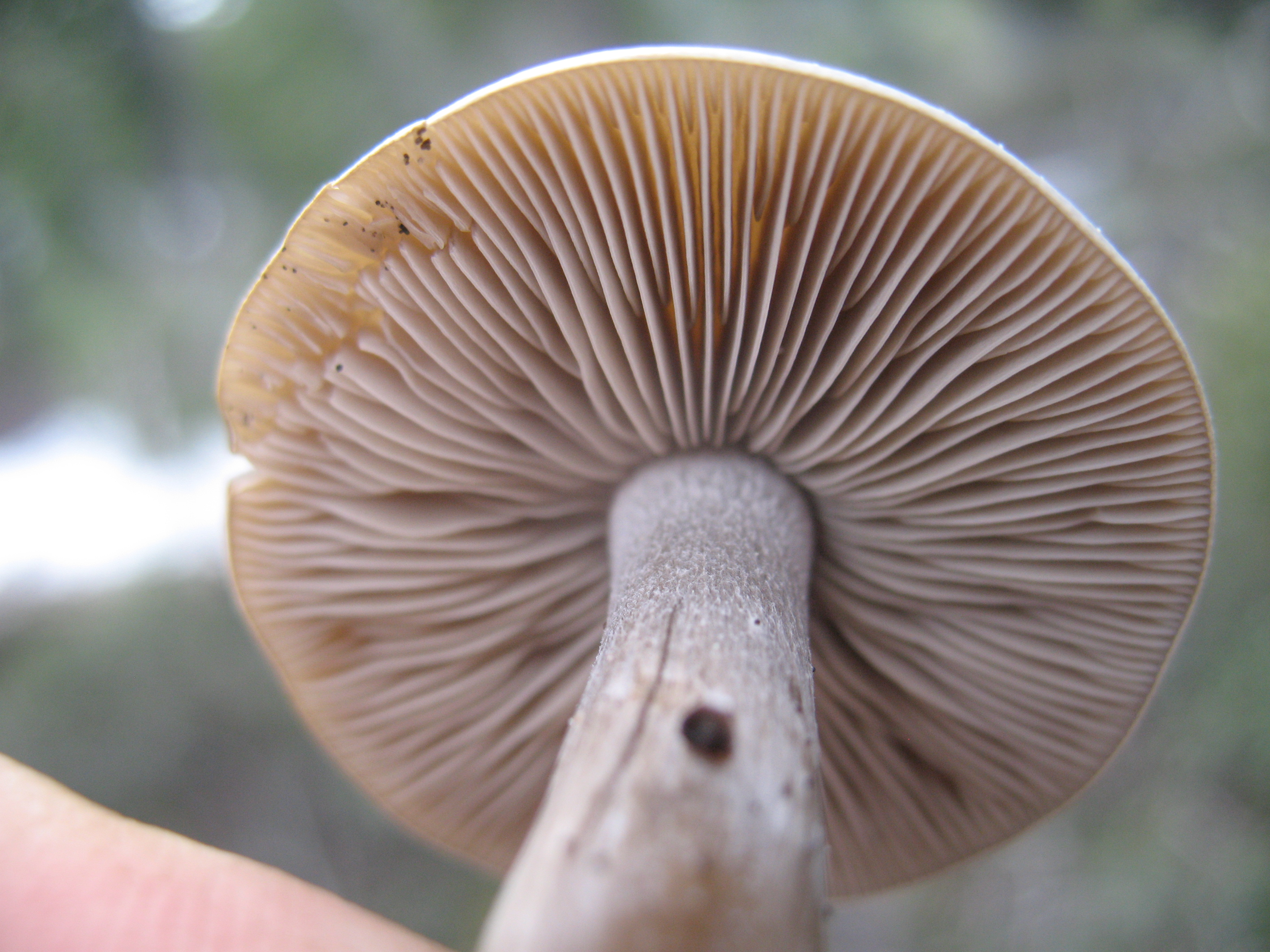
The gills

The gills are gray to dark gray and closely spaced together; the attachment to the stem is adnate to almost free. The stem is colored like the cap, measuring 3 to 7 cm (1 1/8 to 2 3/4 in) long and 0.5 to 1.5 cm (1/4 to 5/8 in) thick, and is either cylindrical or slightly larger at the base, which is covered by white strands.

Its odor is pleasant, but its flavour is not distinctive.

=== Microscopic characteristics ===
Viewed in deposit, such as with a spore print, the spores appear white. Microscopically, the spores are smooth-walled, elliptical or oblong, with dimensions of 5.5–7 by 3.5–4.5 μm.

=== Similar species ===
Clitocybe albirhiza is a brown-colored mushroom with similar stature, but it may be distinguished by the white rhizomorphs at the base of its stem, as well as fibrils on the cap that are arranged in zones. Melanoleuca angelesiana is another species found in the same environment; mature specimens of both species resemble each other. They are easier to differentiate when young, however, as C. glacialis has a silvery-grey bloom that is lacking in M. angelesiana.

== Habitat and distribution ==
This mushroom is found at high elevations from late May until early August. It is referred to as a snowbank mushroom because fruit bodies typically appear around the edges of melting snowbanks. The species has been found in various locales in North America, including Idaho, Oregon, Washington, Montana, and Alberta.

== Edibility ==
The species is considered edible.
