= Snowbank fungus =

Species of fungus

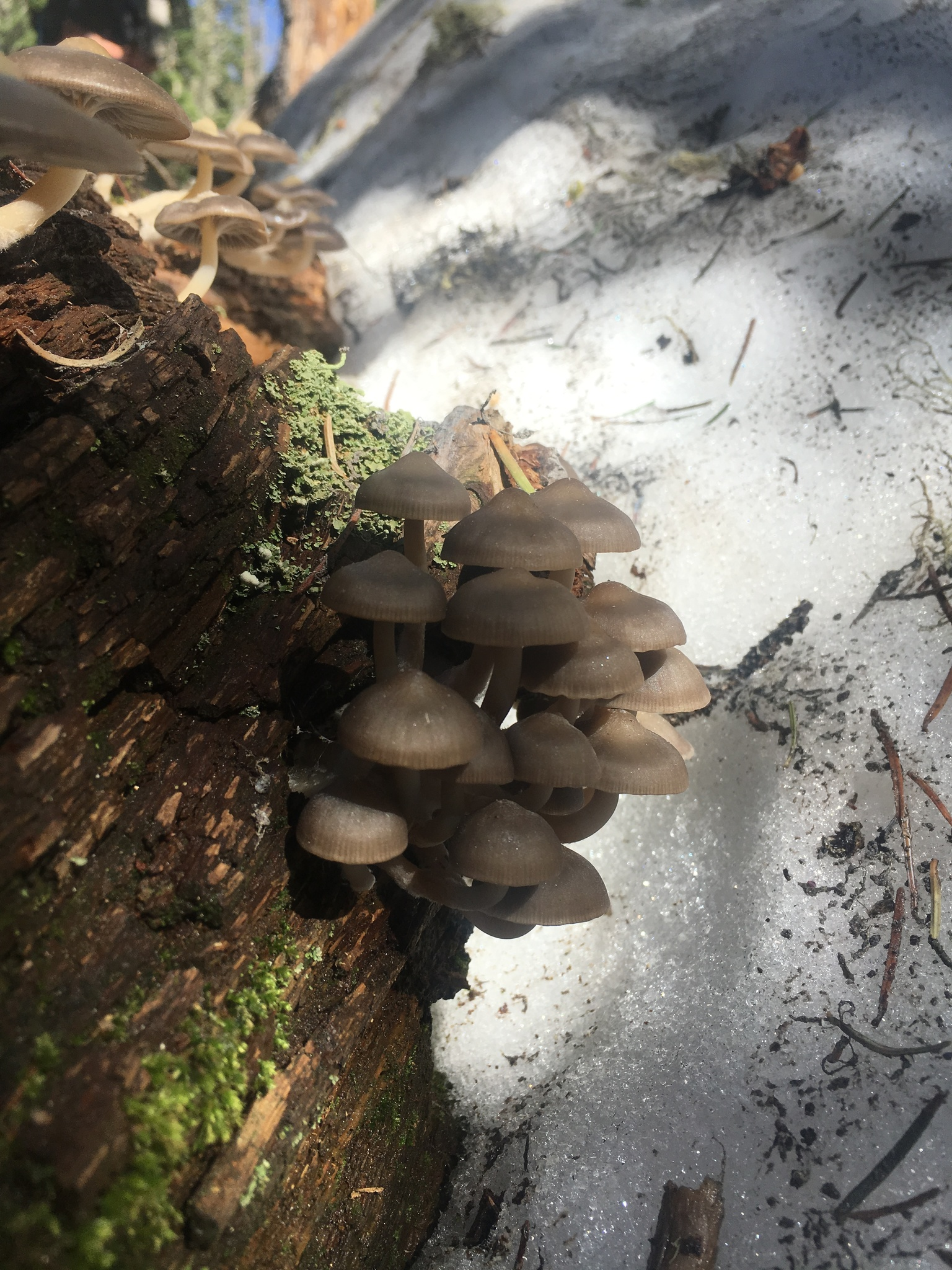
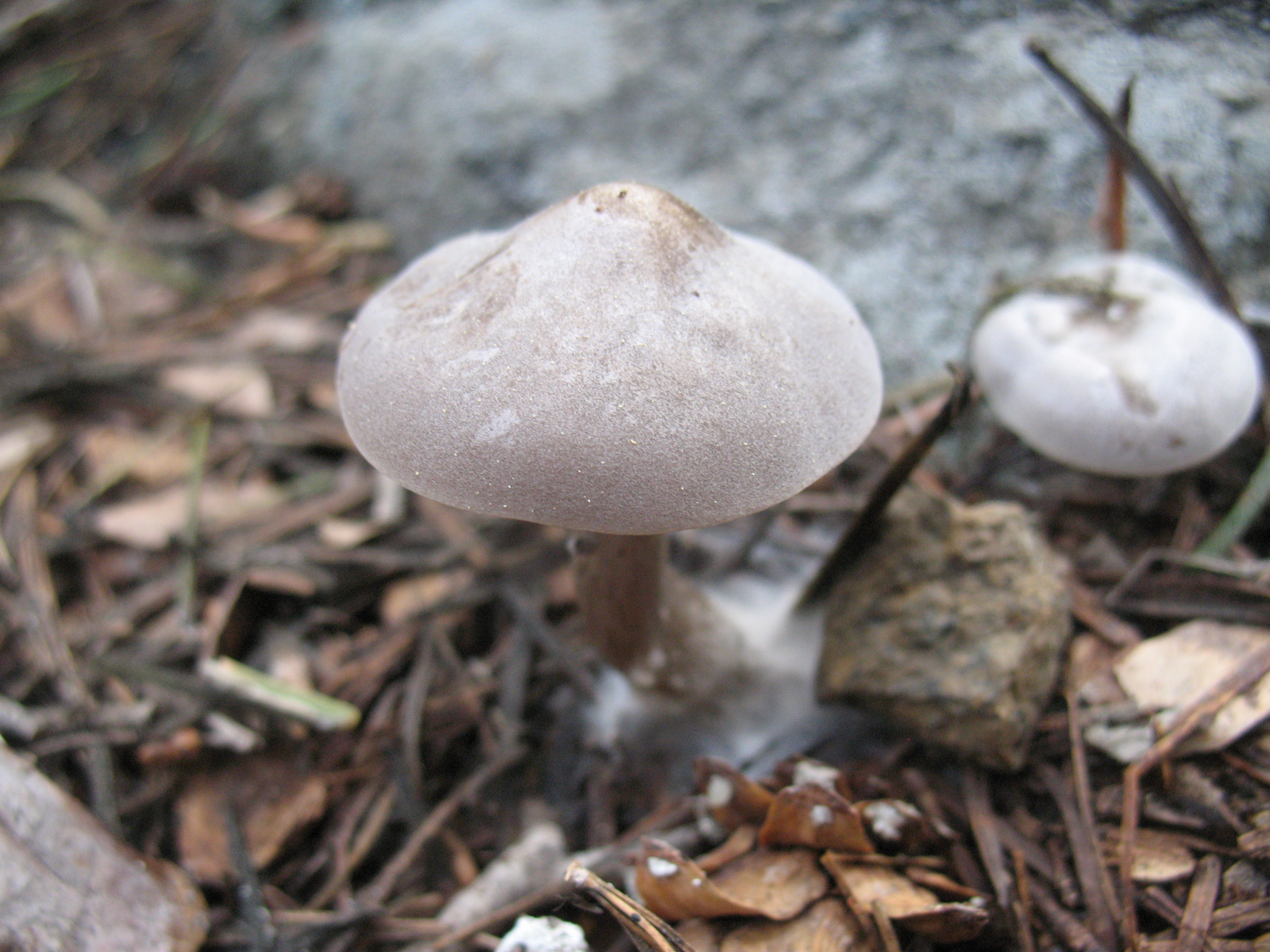
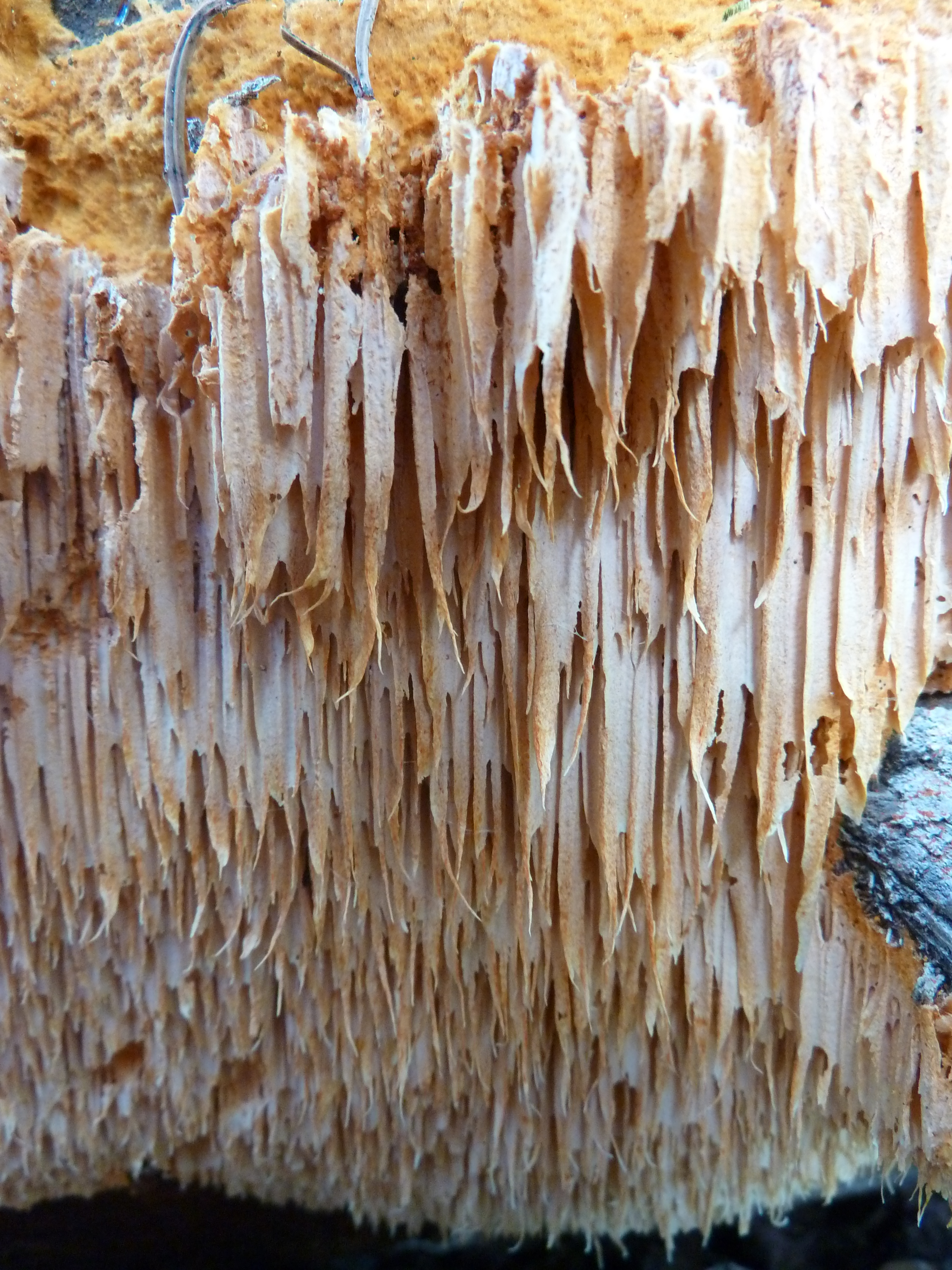
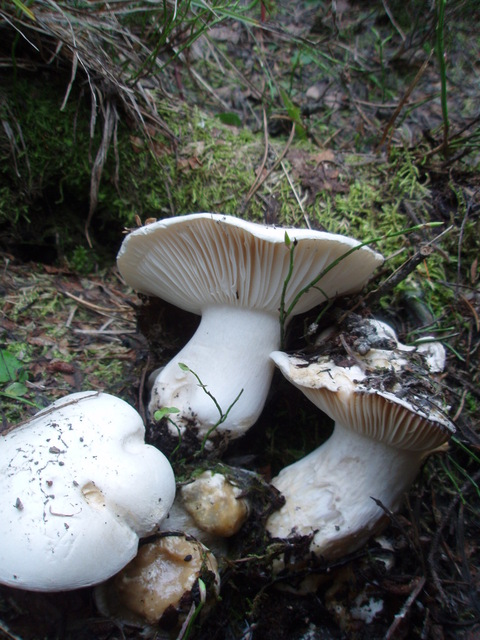
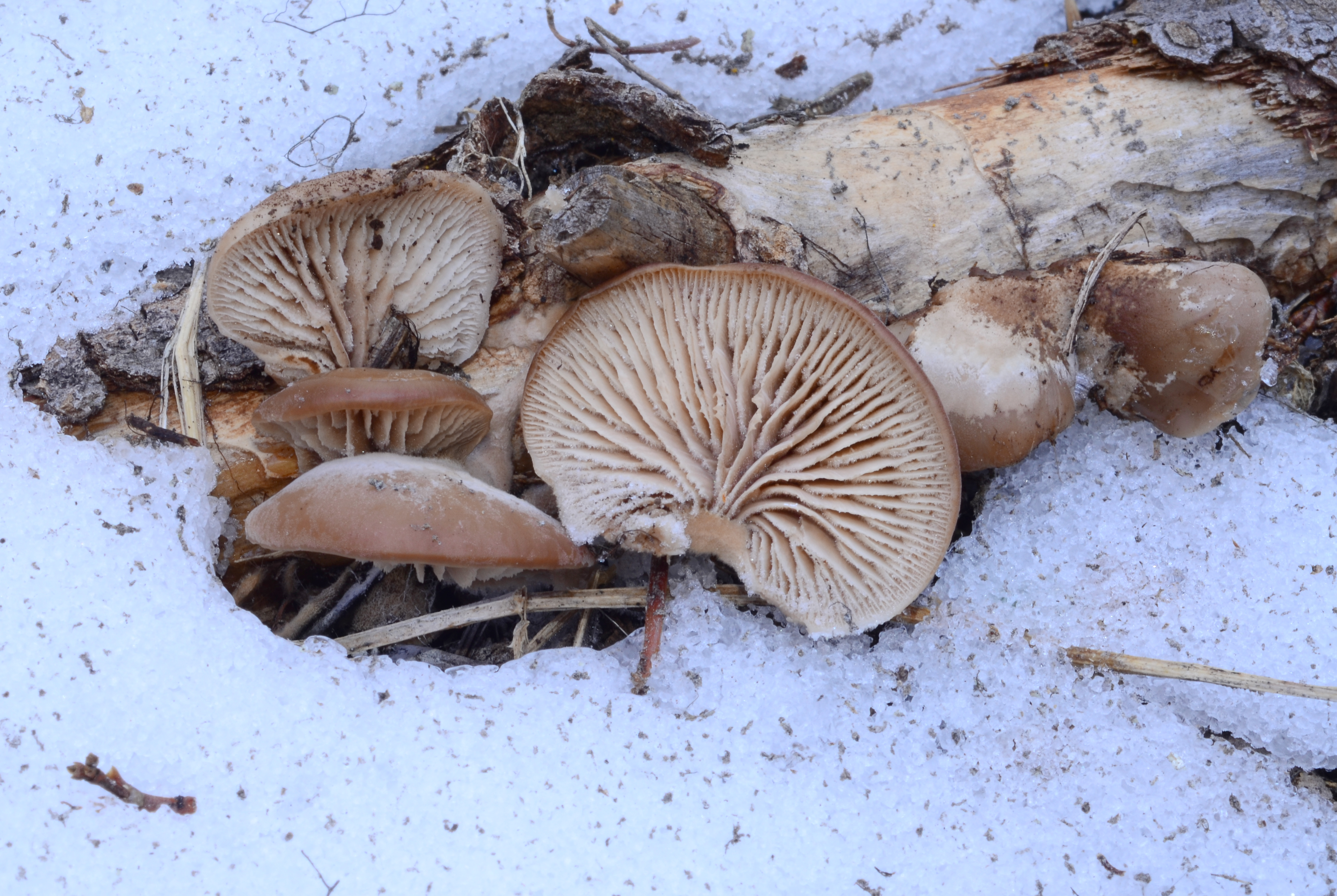
Various species of snowbank fungi. From top left to bottom right they are: Mycena overholtsii, Clitocybe glacialis, Pycnoporellus alboluteus, Hygrophorus subalpinus and Lentinellus montanus.

A snowbank fungus is any one of a number of diverse species of fungi that occur adjacent to or within melting snow. They are most commonly found in the mountains of western North America where a deep snowpack accumulates during the winter and slowly melts through the spring and summer, often shaded by coniferous forest. They may be saprotrophic, mycorrhizal, or in the case of Caloscypha fulgens, pathogenic.

== History ==
William Bridge Cooke was the first to discuss the snowbank fungi as a distinct ecological group in 1944 when he discussed the fungal flora of Mount Shasta in California. He followed this with another publication 11 years later. In his 1975 book A Field Guide to Western Mushrooms, Alexander H. Smith discussed what he called the "snowbank flora", noting "It seems obvious to me that the species in this group are well established throughout the forest zone, and have adjusted to this fruiting pattern, possibly as a response to the habitat drying out and warming up as summer progresses."

== Species ==
Snowbank fungi include members of the Basidiomycota and the Ascomycota. Mycorrhizal basidiomycetes include Cortinarius ahsii, C. auchmerus, C. clandestinus, C. croceus, and some others that are provisionally named, as well as the gasteroid species Pholiota nubigena. White-spored species include the saprobes Clitocybe albirhiza, C. glacialis, Lentinellus montanus (formerly Lyophyllum), Mycena overholtsii, and the conifer cone decomposers Strobilurus albipilatus and S. occidentalis. Also white spored, H. goetzii, H. marzuolus, and H. subalpinus are believed to be (or suspected to be) mycorrhizal with conifers. The ecological preferences of Melanoleuca angelesiana and Pseudoomphalina angelesiana are unknown. Non-gilled basidiomycetes include Pycnoporellus alboluteus and Tyromyces leucospongia.

Ascomycete snowbank fungi include the decomposers Discina perlata, Gyromitra montana, Sarcosoma latahense, and Plectania nannfeldtii. Urnula mexicana is suspected to be mycorrhizal with spruce, while Caloscypha fulgens is a seed pathogen of Picea.

== Habitat and distribution ==
In North America, snowbank fungi range from northern New Mexico north to southern Canada, at elevations from 1,500 to 3,800 metres (4,900 to 12,500 ft). They are common in the Rocky Mountains, the Cascade Range, and other high-elevation areas with short, cold summers. Fruit bodies of snowbank fungi tend to be more prevalent on north-facing slopes and shaded areas. Trees typically found near snowbank fungi include Engelmann spruce (Picea engelmannii), subalpine fir (Abies lasiocarpa), and lodgepole pine (Pinus contorta ), and whitebark pine (Pinus albicaulis), all of which can provide sufficient shade to prevent fast snowmelt. Several species are endemic to western North America, and the phenomenon appears to be restricted to this part of the world. They are not associated with other cold environments, such as arctic or alpine habitats, or with glaciers.
