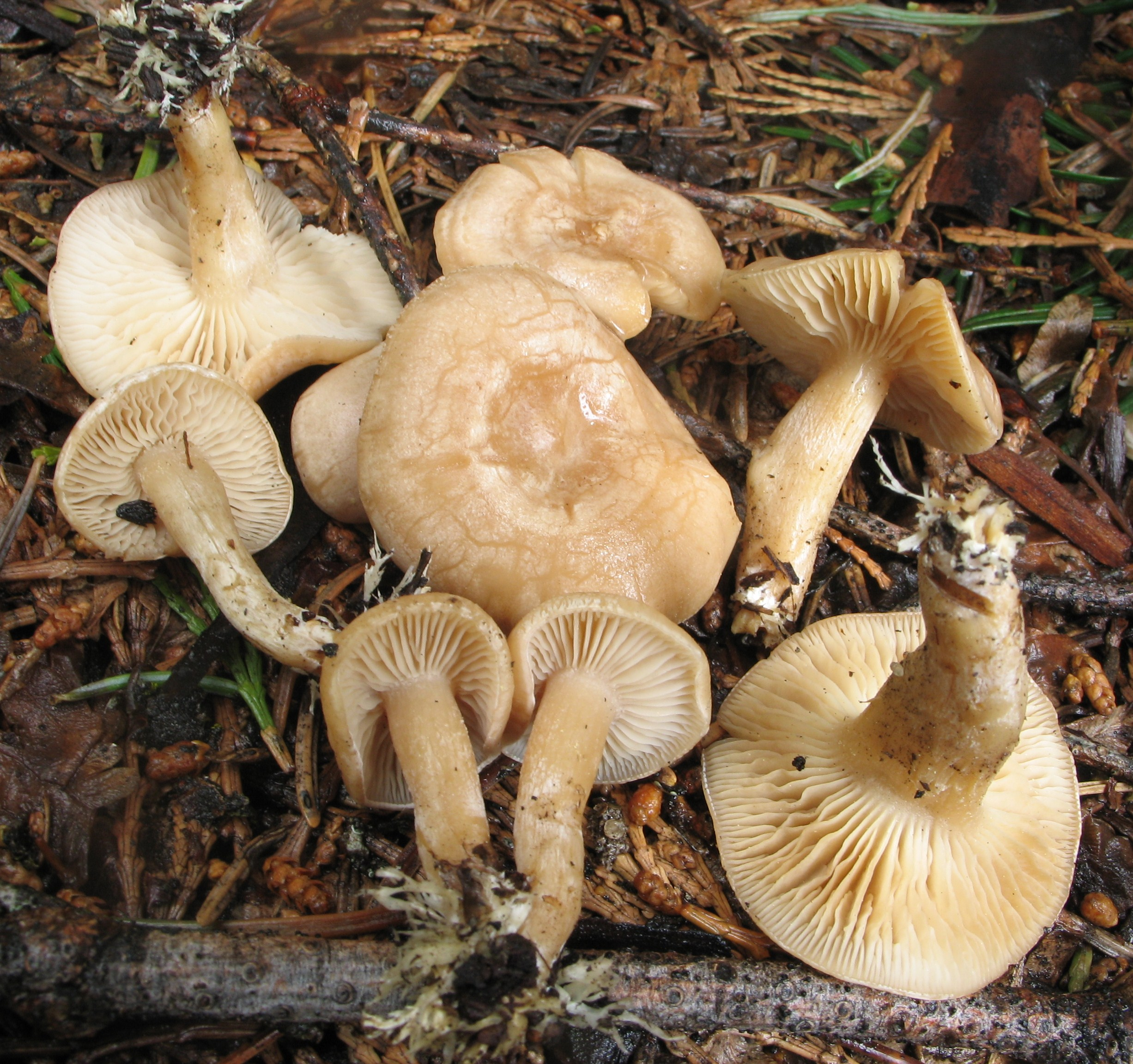

Scientific classification
- Kingdom: Fungi
- Division: Basidiomycota
- Class: Agaricomycetes
- Order: Agaricales
- Family: Clitocybaceae
- Genus: Clitocybe
- Species: C. albirhiza

Binomial name
- Clitocybe albirhiza H.E.Bigelow & A.H.Sm. (1963)

= Clitocybe albirhiza =

Species of fungus

Clitocybe albirhiza
- Mycological characteristics
- Gills on hymenium
- Cap is convex or umbonate
- Hymenium is adnate or decurrent
- Stipe is bare
- Spore print is white
- Ecology is saprotrophic
- Edibility is unknown or inedible

Clitocybe albirhiza, commonly known as the snowmelt clitocybe, is a species of agaric fungus in the family Tricholomataceae. It is found in high-elevation locations in the western United States.

== Taxonomy ==
American mycologists Howard E. Bigelow and Alexander H. Smith first described the species officially in 1963, from specimens collected in June, 1954, near Payette Lake, Idaho.

The species name refers to mycelial cords (rhizomorphs), which extend from the base.

== Description ==
The cap measures 2–10 cm (3/4–4 in), and is initially convex before flattening and becoming funnel-shaped. New blooms are typically whitish, while the color of mature specimens depends on its state of hydration; it is buff when dry, but when wet, it is cinnamon-buff to clay (often with concentric differentiations). The gills have an adnate to decurrent attachment to the stipe and are closely spaced, sometimes with "veins" connected between them; they are roughly the same color as the cap, or paler.

The stipe measures 2–8 cm (3/4–3 1/8 in) long by 0.5–2 cm (1/4–3/4 in) wide, and is either equal in width throughout, or tapers on either end. Initially stuffed with a cottony mycelium when young, it hollows in maturity. Colored similar to the cap, the stipe surface ranges from smooth to canescent (covered with a whitish-grey bloom) when wet, to fibrillose-striate when dry. The stipe base features a dense mass of whitish rhizomorphs embedded with needles and other forest debris. The flesh is mostly thin except for the disc (a circular region in the center of the cap). It has a slight to unpleasant odor and a poor, bitter taste. It is considered inedible.

The spore print is white. The spores are smooth and elliptical, with dimensions of 4.5–6 by 2.5–3.5 μm. The basidia (spore-bearing cells) are typically two- or four-spored (rarely, one-spored) and measure 20–30 by 3.5–5 μm. The hymenium lacks cystidia. Clamp connections are present in the hyphae.

=== Similar species ===
Clitocybe glacialis and Melanoleuca angelesiana are similar in appearance. Clitocybe ramigena is similar, but smaller and not so bitter.

== Habitat and distribution ==
The fruit bodies grow scattered, in groups, or in clusters under spruce, or, occasionally, larch and pine. Found in the US states of Idaho, Washington, and Wyoming, it is abundant in some high-elevation 5,000–10,000 ft (1,500–3,000 m) locations in the Rocky Mountains. It is referred to as a "snowbank mushroom" because fruit bodies typically appear around the edges of melting snowbanks. Fruitings occur most frequently in June and early July, about the same time as snowmelt at the elevations in which the species occurs. In the Cascade Mountains of Washington, it is one of the most common fungi growing on non-serpentine soil.
