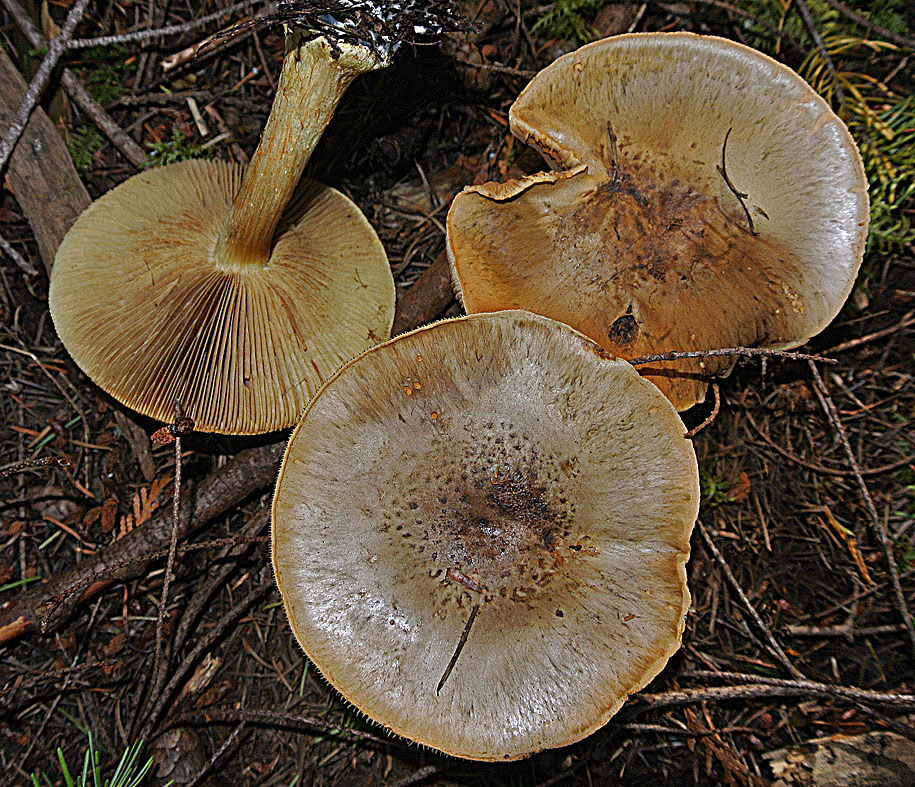

Scientific classification
- Kingdom: Fungi
- Division: Basidiomycota
- Class: Agaricomycetes
- Order: Agaricales
- Family: Cortinariaceae
- Genus: Cortinarius
- Species: C. clandestinus

Binomial name
- Cortinarius clandestinus Kauffman

= Cortinarius clandestinus =

Species of fungus

Cortinarius clandestinus is a species of fungus in the Cortinariaceae family. It was first described in 1932 by Calvin Henry Kauffman from a specimen collected amongst moss under Douglas firs and hemlock at Lake Cushman, Washington. Kauffman states that it is found in the states of New York, Colorado and Washington.

The cap is golden brown and dry, with dark brown fibrillose scales. The flesh is yellowish (darker when fresh) and fairly fragile. It has an odour resembling radish. The gills are close and yellowish. The stem is equal or somewhat clavate, with yellowish veil fibrils and perhaps a ring demarcation.

The European species Cortinarius melanotus is similar, with a brownish veil on the stem. C. cotoneus is tougher, with lighter fibrils. C. venetus var. montanus is greenish, with a yellow veil when young and a tomentose cap.
