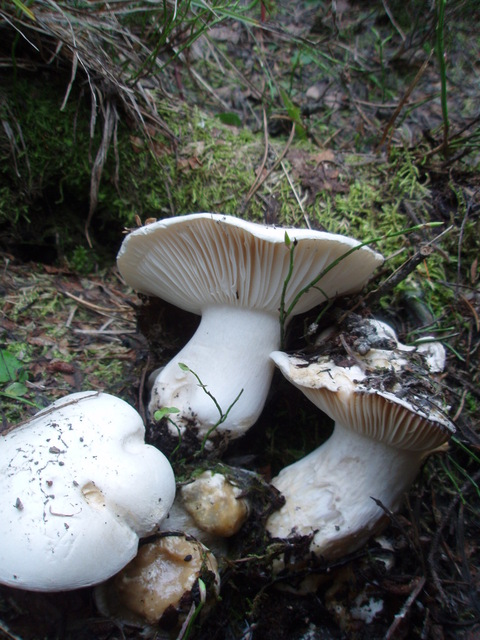

Scientific classification
- Kingdom: Fungi
- Division: Basidiomycota
- Class: Agaricomycetes
- Order: Agaricales
- Family: Hygrophoraceae
- Genus: Hygrophorus
- Species: H. subalpinus

Binomial name
- Hygrophorus subalpinus A.H.Sm. (1941)

= Hygrophorus subalpinus =

Species of fungus

Hygrophorus subalpinus, commonly known as the subalpine waxycap or snowbank waxy cap, is a species of white snowbank fungus in the family Hygrophoraceae. Found in the mountains of western North America, it is found growing on the ground under conifers, usually near snowbanks.

== Description ==
The cap is 4.5 to 13 cm (1 3/4 to 5 1/8 in) wide, with a convex shape that becomes flattened in age; sometimes it develops a central umbo (a rounded elevation resembling a nipple). The cap is sticky, white, and the cap margin often has fragments of the veil adhering. The flesh is soft, thick and white. The gills, which are attached decurrently to the stipe (running down the length of the stipe), are narrow, packed closely together, and white-colored. The stipe is white, 3 to 4 centimetres (1 1/8 to 1 5/8 in) long and 1 to 2 cm (3/8 to 3/4 in) thick at the apex; when young the base of the stipe is bulbous but as it grows it thins and becomes almost the same width as at the top of the stem. A membranous annulus is present low on the stipe.

The mushroom has virtually no taste.

=== Microscopic characteristics ===
The spores are white in deposit; microscopically, they are ellipsoid and smooth, with dimensions of 8–10 by 4.5–5 μm. There are no cystidia present in the gills of this species, and clamp connections are present on the hyphae.

=== Similar species ===
The external appearance of Hygrophorus ponderatus resembles H. subalpinus, but the former species has a sticky or slimy cap surface, a veil that appears to be made of fibers (rather than a membrane), and narrower gills. Russula brevipes and Tricholoma vernaticum are also similar.

== Habitat and distribution ==
The fruit bodies of H. subalpinus grows in large clusters under conifers, often near snowbanks, and typically at high elevations, such as on mountains. It usually appears after the snow in the area has receded, sometimes growing partly underground. It is found in North America, from the Rocky Mountains to the Pacific Northwest.

Hygrophorus subalpinus
- Mycological characteristics
- Gills on hymenium
- Cap is convex or flat
- Hymenium is adnate or decurrent
- Stipe is bare or has a ring
- Spore print is white
- Ecology is mycorrhizal
- Edibility is edible

== Ecology ==
Deer eat the mushroom.

== Uses ==
Hygrophorus subalpinus is said to be edible, but bland. David Arora notes that it "does not have the greatest texture and flavor". One guide recommends it as a substitute for bamboo shoots.

== See also ==
- List of Hygrophorus species
