= Russula pseudodelica =

Scientific classification
- Kingdom: Fungi
- Division: Basidiomycota
- Class: Agaricomycetes
- Order: Russulales
- Family: Russulaceae
- Genus: Russula
- Species: R. pseudodelica

Binomial name
- Russula pseudodelica J.E. Lange 1926

Species of fungus

Russula pseudodelica is a mushroom in the genus Russula.
