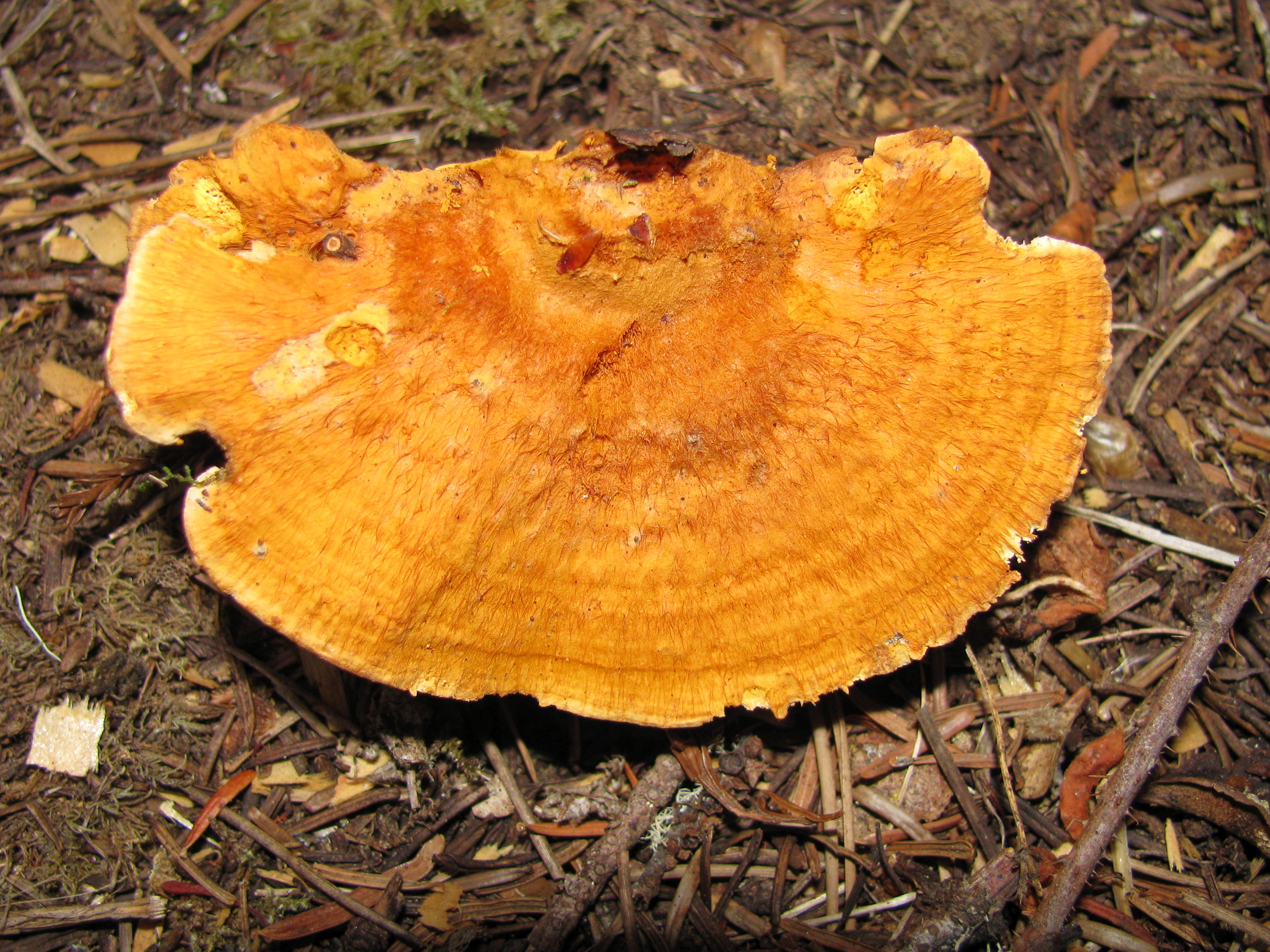

Scientific classification
- Kingdom: Fungi
- Division: Basidiomycota
- Class: Agaricomycetes
- Order: Polyporales
- Family: Fomitopsidaceae
- Genus: Pycnoporellus
- Species: P. fulgens

Binomial name
- Pycnoporellus fulgens (Fr.) Donk, 1971

= Pycnoporellus fulgens =

Species of fungus

Pycnoporellus fulgens is a species of fungus belonging to the family Pycnoporellaceae.

It is native to Eurasia and Northern America. It has a wide distribution both continents

== Taxonomy ==
The species Pycnoporellus fulgens is a fungus in the order Polyporales, which are generally known as polypores or shelf fungi. This includes many non-agaric, wood-eating fungi.

== Description ==
Pycnoporellus fulgens inhabits dead conifer logs, and is a brown-rot decayer. The fruiting body is most commonly observed in the late summer months of July and August, found on the sides of logs. The fungus produces tough, woody, shelf-like fruiting bodies that are typically an orange or orange-red color, with a yellower leading edge. The underside of the fruiting body displays a complex white or yellow pore surface.

Pycnoporellus fulgens
- Mycological characteristics
- Pores on hymenium
- No distinct cap
- Hymenium attachment is irregular or not applicable
- Lacks a stipe
- Spore print is white to cream
- Ecology is saprotrophic
- Edibility is too hard to eat or unknown

== Habitat ==
The fungus lives in dead conifer logs, and as such, is often found in conifer forests. Examples of species it may inhabit are the dead logs of Norway Spruce and Douglas Fir.
