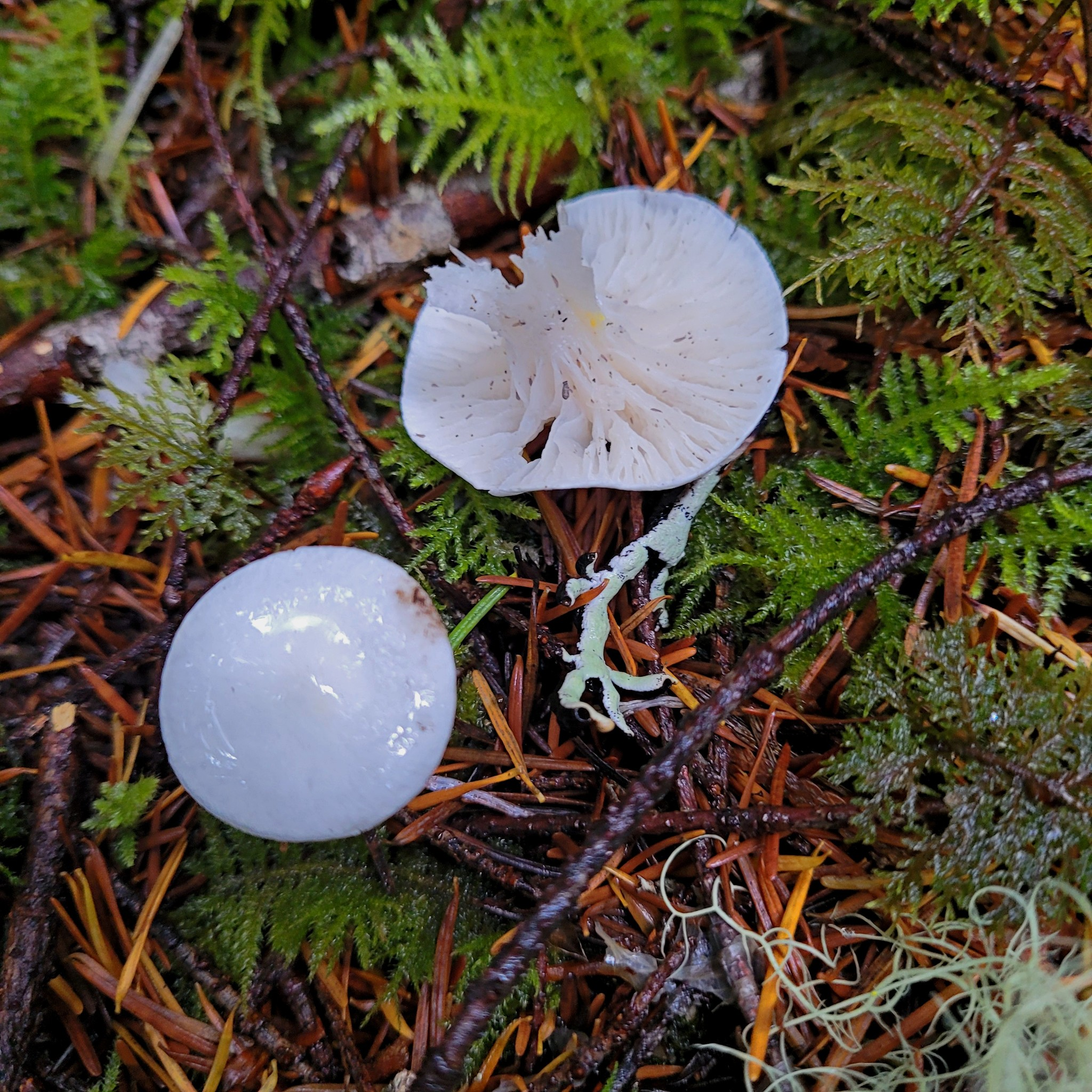

Scientific classification
- Kingdom: Fungi
- Division: Basidiomycota
- Class: Agaricomycetes
- Order: Agaricales
- Family: Hygrophoraceae
- Genus: Hygrophorus
- Species: H. piceae

Binomial name
- Hygrophorus piceae Kühner

= Hygrophorus piceae =

Species of fungus

Hygrophorus piceae, commonly known as the white waxy cap, is a species of mushroom in the family Hygrophoraceae. While technically edible, it is considered to be bland and slimy.

== Description ==
The cap of Hygrophorus piceae is white in color and about 1-5 centimeters in diameter. It starts out campanulate to convex and becomes broadly convex or flat in age. It is slimy when wet. The stipe is about 2-7 centimeters long and 3-10 millimeters wide. It is also white in color, but can become yellowish in older specimens. The gills are whitish in color and adnate to decurrent. The spore print is white.

=== Similar species ===
Hygrophorus piceae has at least two extremely similar species that have yet to be described. Other similar species include the larger, slimy-stalked H. eburneus, the almondy-smelling H. sitchensis, and the beige or off-white H. gliocyclus.

Hygrophorus piceae
- Mycological characteristics
- Gills on hymenium
- Cap is campanulate or flat
- Hymenium is adnate or decurrent
- Stipe is bare
- Spore print is white
- Ecology is mycorrhizal
- Edibility is edible, but unpalatable

== Habitat and ecology ==
Hygrophorus piceae can be found in the Pacific Northwest, where it often grows in spruce forests near the coast. It also sometimes occurs at higher elevations.
