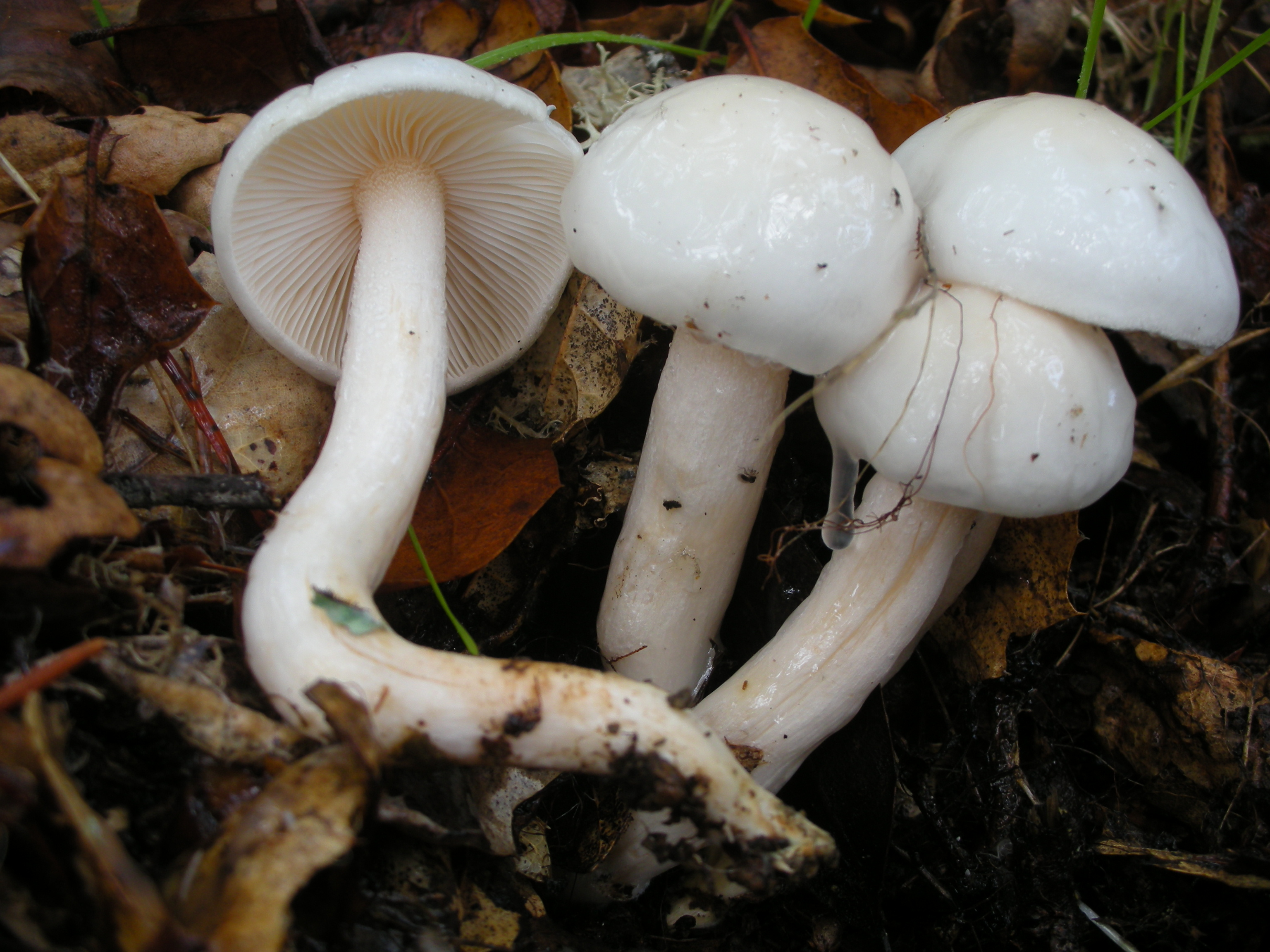

Scientific classification
- Kingdom: Fungi
- Division: Basidiomycota
- Class: Agaricomycetes
- Order: Agaricales
- Family: Hygrophoraceae
- Genus: Hygrophorus
- Species: H. eburneus

Binomial name
- Hygrophorus eburneus (Bull.) Fr.

Synonyms
- Agaricus eburneus Bull. Gymnopus eburneus (Bull.) Gray; Limacium eburneum (Bull.) P. Kumm.

= Hygrophorus eburneus =

Species of fungus

Hygrophorus eburneus Mycological characteristics
- Gills on hymenium
- Cap is convex or flat
- Hymenium is decurrent
- Stipe is bare
- Spore print is white
- Ecology is mycorrhizal
- Edibility is edible

Hygrophorus eburneus, commonly known as the ivory waxy cap or the cowboy's handkerchief, is a species of edible mushroom in the waxgill family of fungi. Hygrophorus eburneus is the type species of the genus Hygrophorus. The fruit bodies are medium-sized, pure white, and when wet are covered in a layer of slime thick enough to make the mushroom difficult to pick up. The gills are broadly attached to the stem or running down it; as the family name suggests, they feel waxy when rubbed between the fingers.

It is widespread in Europe and North America, and has also been collected in northern Africa. Like all Hygrophorus species, the fungus is mycorrhizal—having a symbiotic association whereby the underground fungal mycelia penetrate and exchange nutrients with tree roots. They are common in a variety of forest types, where they grow on the ground in thickets or grassy areas. A number of biologically active chemicals have been purified from the fruit bodies of the fungus, including fatty acids with bactericidal and fungicidal activity.

== Taxonomy ==
The species was first named as Agaricus eburneus by French botanist Jean Bulliard in 1783. Elias Fries divided the large genus Agaricus into a number of "tribes" (taxonomically equivalent to modern sections) in his Systema Mycologicum I, and classified A. eburneus in the tribe Limacium. When In 1836, Fries first defined the genus Hygrophorus in his Epicrisis Systematis Mycologici, H. eburneus was included. The fungus has also been named Limacium eburneum by Paul Kummer in 1871, when he raised the tribes of Fries to the rank of genus, and Gymnopus eburneus by Samuel Frederick Gray in 1821. H. eburneus is the type species of the genus Hygrophorus, and is classified in the section Hygrophorus, subsection Hygrophorus. This includes species with non-amyloid, smooth spores, and divergent hyphae in the tissue of the hymenium. Other species in this subsection include H. eburneiformis, H. coccus, H. ponderatus, H. chrysaspis, and H. glutinosus.

The mushroom is commonly known as the "ivory waxy cap", the "white waxy cap", or the "cowboy's handkerchief". The specific epithet eburneus is a Latin adjective meaning "of ivory".

== Description ==
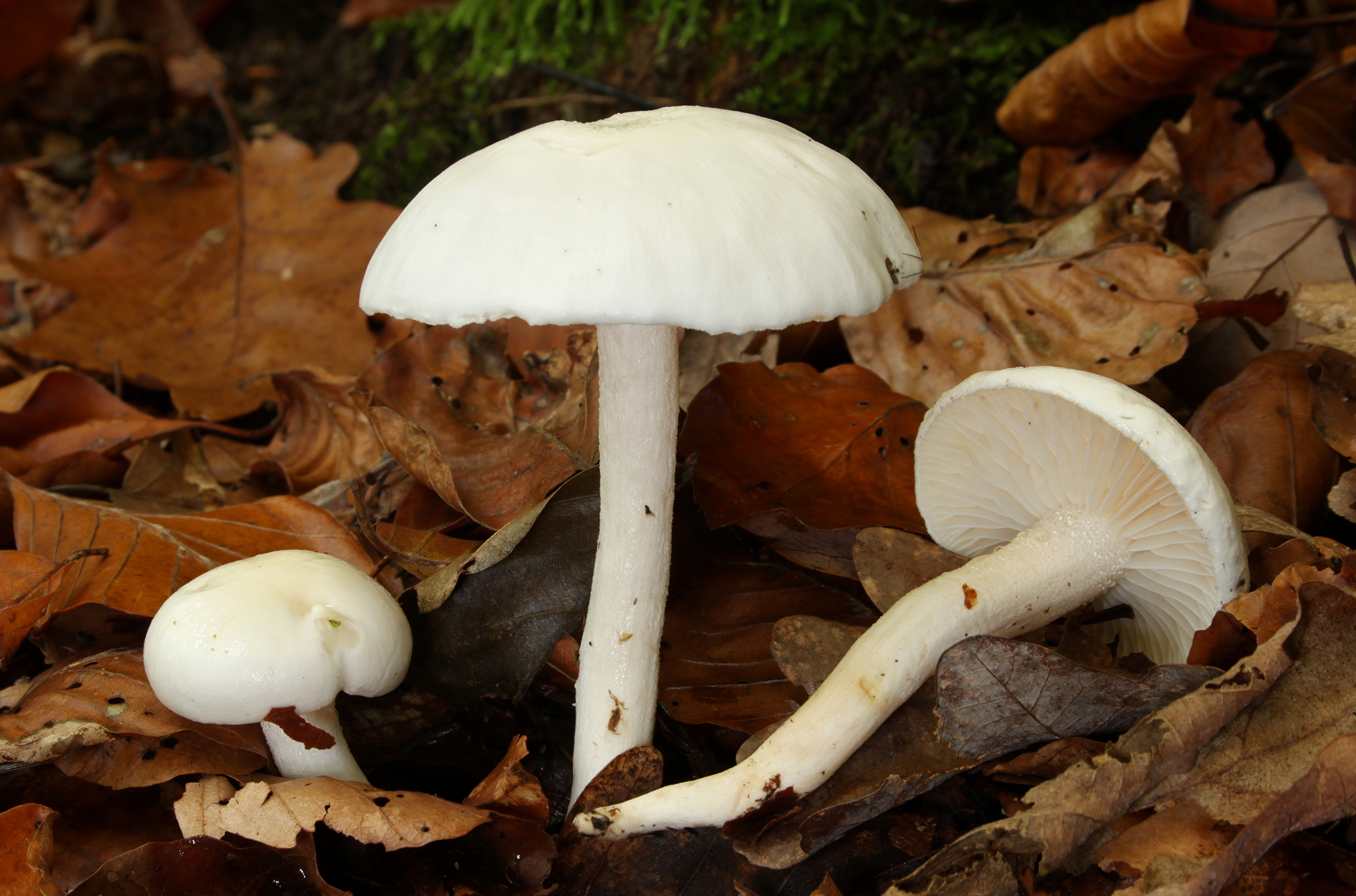
The species is characterized by its extremely slimy cap.

The cap of H. eburneus is 2 to 7 cm (0.8 to 2.8 in) broad, with a shape ranging from convex to flattened, sometimes with an umbo (a raised area in the center of the cap). In age the cap margin sometimes becomes elevated and the center of the cap depressed. The cap is pure white, and depending on the moisture in the environment, may be glutinous to sticky. The cap surface is smooth, the margin is even and in young specimens, rolled inward and covered with short fibrils. The flesh is soft and white, thick in the center of the cap but thinning toward the margin. The odor and taste are mild.

The gills are somewhat arcuate-decurrent, meaning they are shaped like a bow, curving upward and then running down the stem for a short distance. In terms of spacing, they are subdistant to distant, so that space can be seen between them. The gills are moderately broad, broadest near the stem, narrowed in front, pure white, slightly yellowish or buff with age or when dried. The stem is 4 to 15 cm (1.6 to 5.9 in) long, 0.2 to 1.5 cm (0.08 to 0.6 in) thick, equal in width throughout its length to somewhat tapered downward or with a greatly attenuated base, and glutinous. Its surface is silky beneath the gluten. The top of the stem is covered with short fibrils, pure white, sometimes becoming grayish or dirty with age. It is initially stuffed with cotton-like mycelia, then later becomes hollow. The caps of dried fruit bodies will typically remain white, while the stems will dry darker, especially if they are initially waterlogged.

=== Microscopic characteristics ===
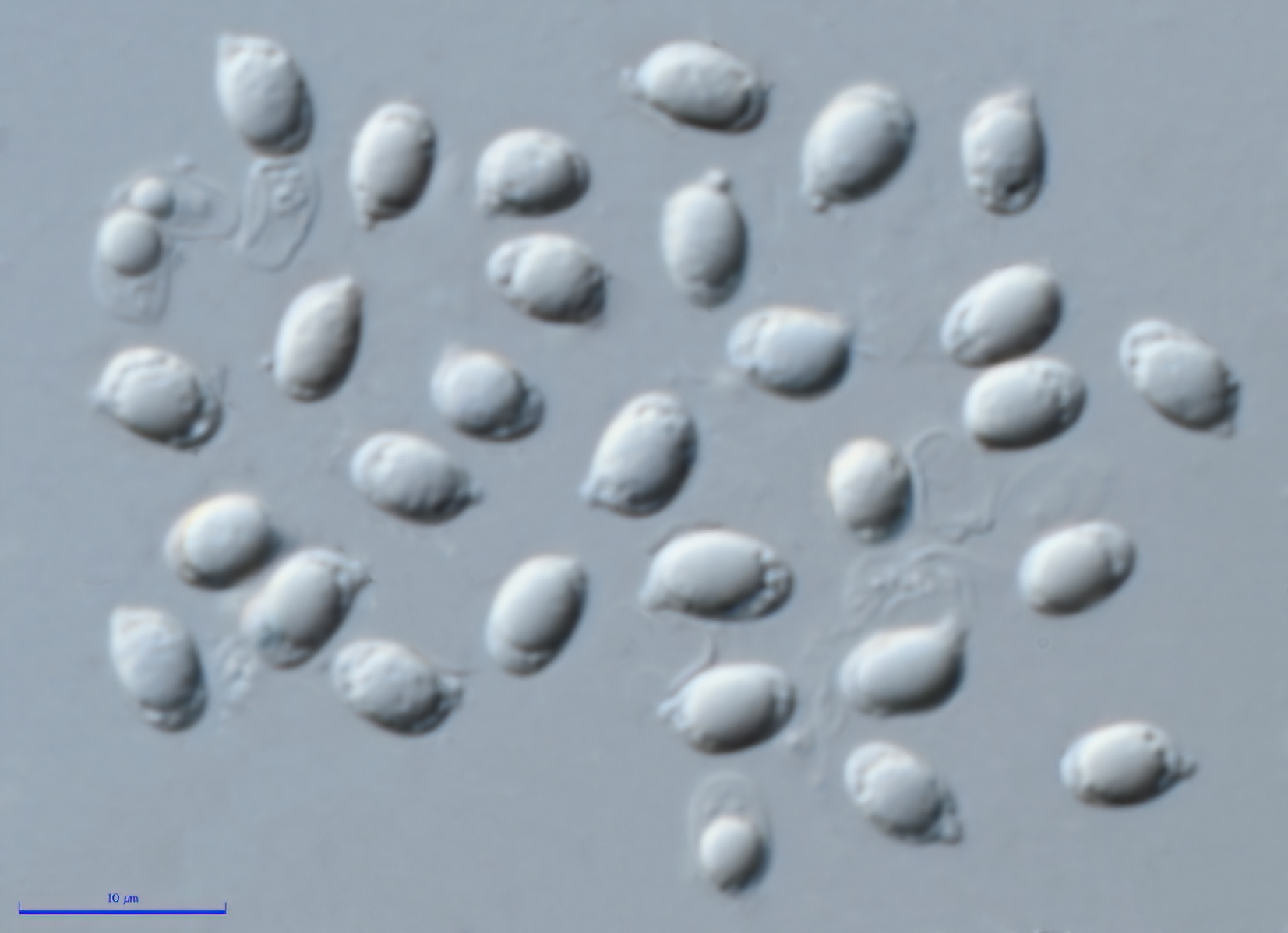
The spores are ellipsoid and smooth.

When they are viewed in mass, such as with a spore print, the spores appear white. Observing with a light microscope reveals additional details: spores are ellipsoid, smooth, and measure 6–8 by 3.5–5 μm. They are pale yellow in Melzer's reagent. The basidia (spore-bearing cells) are 42–52 by 6-8 μm, and four-spored. There are no pleurocystidia or cheilocystidia. The gill tissue is made of branching hyphae about 7–12 μm wide. The cap cuticle is made of gelatinous, narrow (3–6 μm) hyphae which are repent (bent over) but typically with some erect free ends. Clamp connections are present in the hyphae.

=== Similar species ===
A lookalike species of Hygrophorus eburneus is H. piceae, which differs by having a less slimy cap, dry to slightly viscid stem, and frequent association with spruce. H. gliocyclus is just as slimy, but has a cream-colored cap, thicker stalk, and grows with pine. The "snow white waxy cap" (H. borealis) is also similar in appearance, but has a smaller cap diameter of up to 4.5 cm (1.8 in)—and is not slimy. Hygrophorus cossus, which typically grows with Quercus species, differs in its pale pinkish-buff cap and gills, and has a distinct sour odor; also, H. cossus does not have a potassium hydroxide reaction on the stem as does H. eburneus. Limacella illinita has non-waxy gills that are free from attachment to the stalk. Cuphophyllus virgineus has decurrent, distant gills.

== Habitat and distribution ==
The fruit bodies of H. eburneus grow on the soil, mostly in coniferous woods, thickets and grassy areas. The fungus prefers soil that is moist, mesic, loamy and calcareous.

The fungus is widely distributed in North America. It is also found in Europe (Poland and Portugal), Israel and North Africa.

== Uses ==
The mushroom is edible, although it may not be appealing to many due to its sliminess. In China, a yak milk beverage is made with H. eburneus and yak milk, by lactic acid fermentation with Lactobacillus bulgaricus, Streptococcus thermophilus and Lactobacillus acidophilus as mixed starter.

=== Bioactive compounds ===
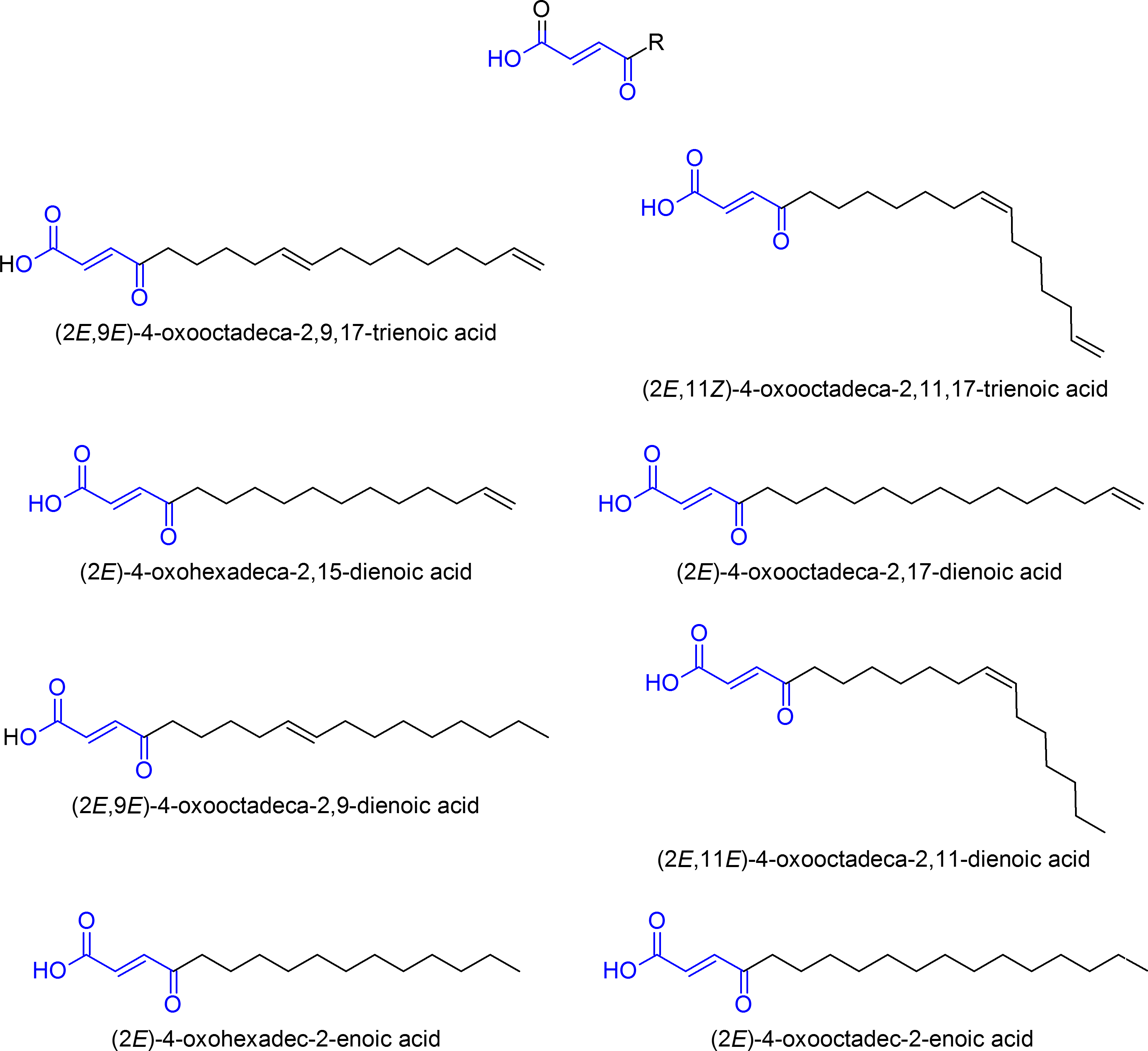
γ-Oxocrotonic acids found in Hygrophorus eburneus

Several fatty acids with bactericidal and fungicidal activity have been isolated and identified from the fruit bodies of H. eburneus. The bioactive fatty acids are built upon a chemical structure called γ-oxocrotonate. The following gamma-oxocrotonate derivatives have been identified from the mushroom: (2E,9E)-4-oxooctadeca-2,9,17-trienoic acid, (2E,11Z)-4-oxooctadeca-2,11,17-trienoic acid, (E)-4-oxohexadeca-2,15-dienoic acid, (E)-4-oxooctadeca-2,17-dienoic acid, (2E,9E)-4-oxooctadeca-2,9-dienoic acid, (2E,11Z)-4-oxooctadeca-2,11-dienoic acid, (E)-4-oxohexadec-2-enoic acid, and (E)-4-oxooctadec-2-enoic acid. The compound (E)-4-oxohexadec-2-enoic acid has been investigated for potential use as a fungicide against the oomycete species Phytophthora infestans, a causal agent of potato and tomato late blight disease.

Additional secondary metabolites discovered in H. eburneus include the ceramide compound named hygrophamide ((2S,3R,4R,2'R)-2-(2'-hydroxy-9'Z-ene-tetracosanoylamino)-octadecane-1,3,4-triol), and the β-carboline alkaloids known as harmane and norharmane. The report of discovery of the latter two compounds in 2008 represents their first known occurrence in fungal fruit bodies.

== See also ==
- List of Hygrophorus species
