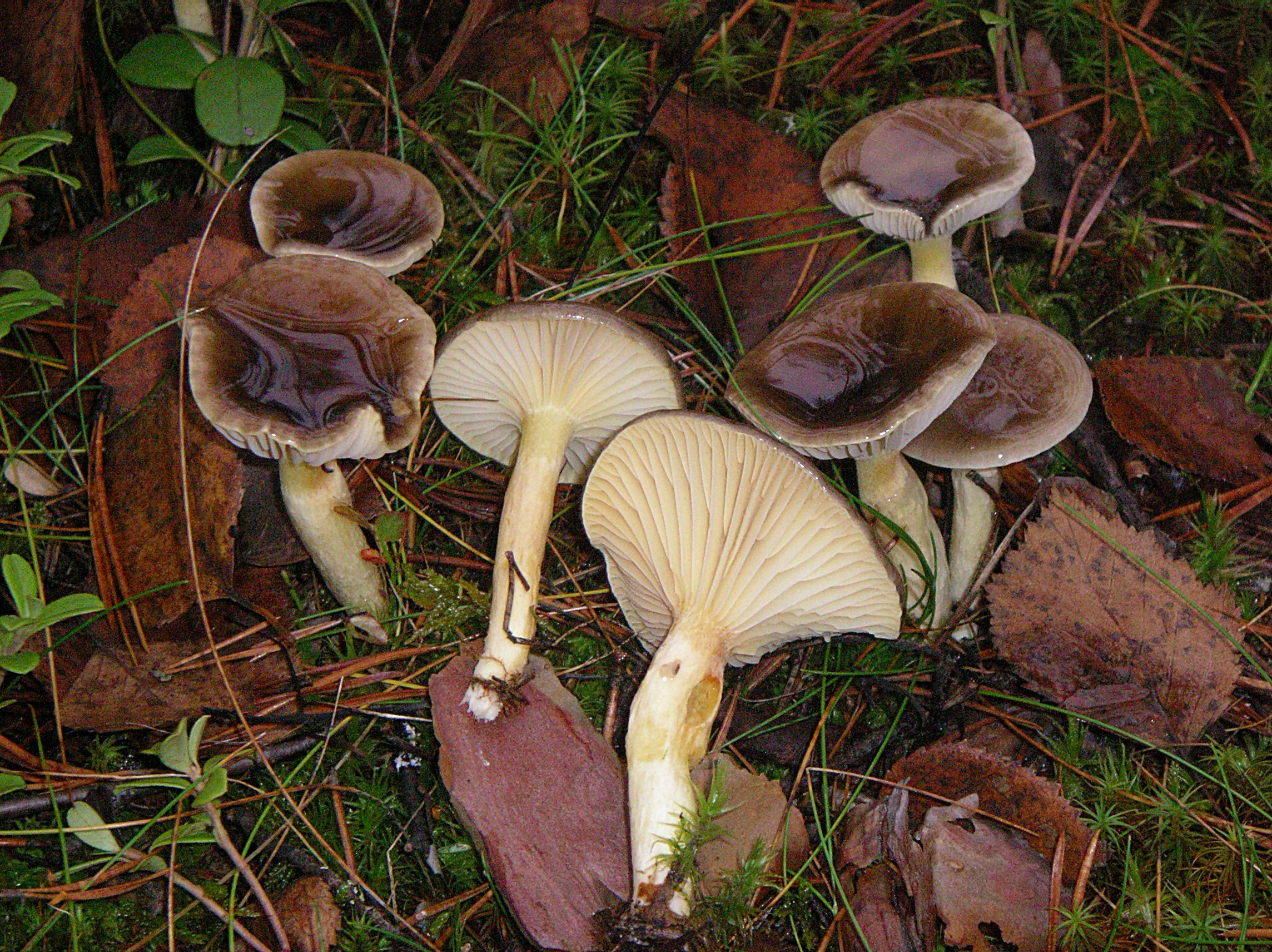

Scientific classification
- Kingdom: Fungi
- Division: Basidiomycota
- Class: Agaricomycetes
- Order: Agaricales
- Family: Hygrophoraceae
- Genus: Hygrophorus
- Species: H. hypothejus

Binomial name
- Hygrophorus hypothejus Fr. (Fr.), 1838

Synonyms
- Agaricus hypothejus Fr. 1821; Limacium hypothejum (Fr.) P. Kumm., 1871; Hygrophorus aureus Arrh., 1863; Limacium aureum (Arrh.) Ricken, 1910

= Hygrophorus hypothejus =

Species of fungus

Hygrophorus hypothejus Mycological characteristics
- Gills on hymenium
- Cap is convex or umbonate
- Hymenium is decurrent or adnate
- Stipe is bare
- Spore print is white
- Edibility is edible

Hygrophorus hypothejus, commonly known as the olive-brown waxy cap, or herald of the winter, is an edible species of fungus in the genus Hygrophorus native to Europe. It appears in late autumn in coniferous forests, often with the first frosts.

== Taxonomy ==
Elias Magnus Fries described this species in 1821 as Agaricus hypothejus, before placing it in the genus Hygrophorus in 1838. Its species name is derived from the Ancient Greek words hypo and theios "sulphur yellow underneath". It has the common name of herald of the winter as it appears in autumn with the onset of the first overnight frosts. Alternate names are late fall waxy cap in the United States, and yellow-gilled waxcap.

== Description ==
The cap measures 3–6 cm (1 1/8–2 3/8 in) across, is yellowish to olive brown with a dark center and slimy surface, and has a rolled margin when young, flattening and becoming more funnel-shaped as it ages. The yellow gills are decurrent, and the flesh is pale yellow, turning orange-red when bruised. The slender stipe is 4–7 cm (1 5/8–2 3/4 in) tall and 0.7–1.4 cm (1/4–1/2 in) wide. The colour can become more intense with the onset of frosts. The spore print is white and the oval spores measure 7–9 x 4–5 micrometres.

=== Similar species ===
A number of species in the genus are similar, including H. speciosus. It could also be confused with Gomphidius glutinosus (the slimy spike cap), the gills of which separate easily from the cap.

== Distribution and habitat ==
The mushroom grows in coniferous forests, appearing in October and November, occasionally December. Though mushrooms may be abundant, they are often hard to spot among the pine needles. They often appear in big groups of individuals and clusters.

== Edibility ==
It is edible but of variable quality, as some specimens may be slimy.
