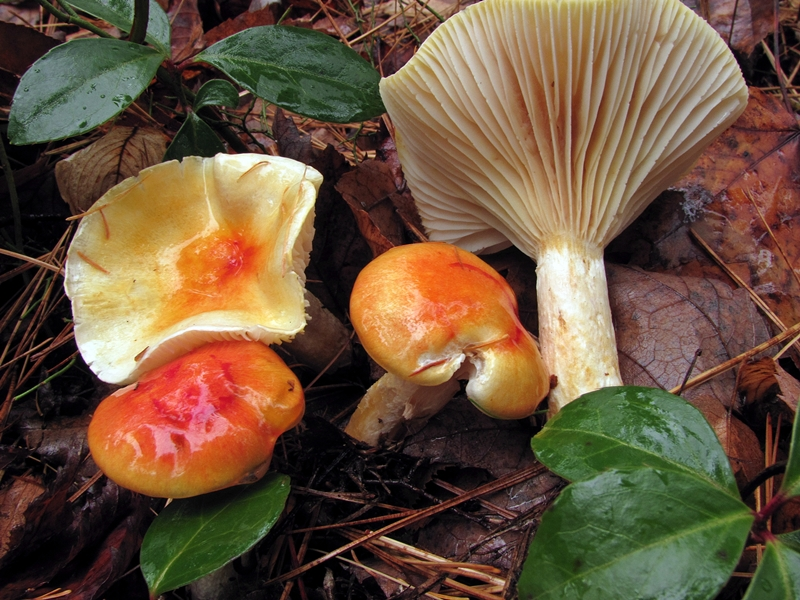

Scientific classification
- Domain: Eukaryota
- Kingdom: Fungi
- Division: Basidiomycota
- Class: Agaricomycetes
- Order: Agaricales
- Family: Hygrophoraceae
- Genus: Hygrophorus
- Species: H. speciosus

Binomial name
- Hygrophorus speciosus Peck, 1878

= Hygrophorus speciosus =

Species of fungus

Hygrophorus speciosus Mycological characteristics
- Gills on hymenium
- Cap is convex or umbonate
- Hymenium is adnate or decurrent
- Stipe is bare
- Spore print is white
- Edibility is edible

Hygrophorus speciosus, commonly known as the larch waxy cap, is a species of fungus in the genus Hygrophorus. It has a bright red-orange cap which yellows with age, and a white or yellow stem; both are slimy, but the fruit bodies are less so with age. The gills are whitish to light yellow, and decurrent. Lookalike species include H. hypothejus and H. pyrophilus.

The species can be found inland within the Pacific Northwest, in areas where larch is plentiful. While edible, the flavor of most Hygrophorus species is considered bland.
