= Hygrophorus mesotephrus =

Scientific classification
- Domain: Eukaryota
- Kingdom: Fungi
- Division: Basidiomycota
- Class: Agaricomycetes
- Order: Agaricales
- Family: Hygrophoraceae
- Genus: Hygrophorus
- Species: H. mesotephrus

Binomial name
- Hygrophorus mesotephrus Berk. & Broome, 1854

Species of fungus

Hygrophorus mesotephrus is a species of fungus in the genus Hygrophorus.
