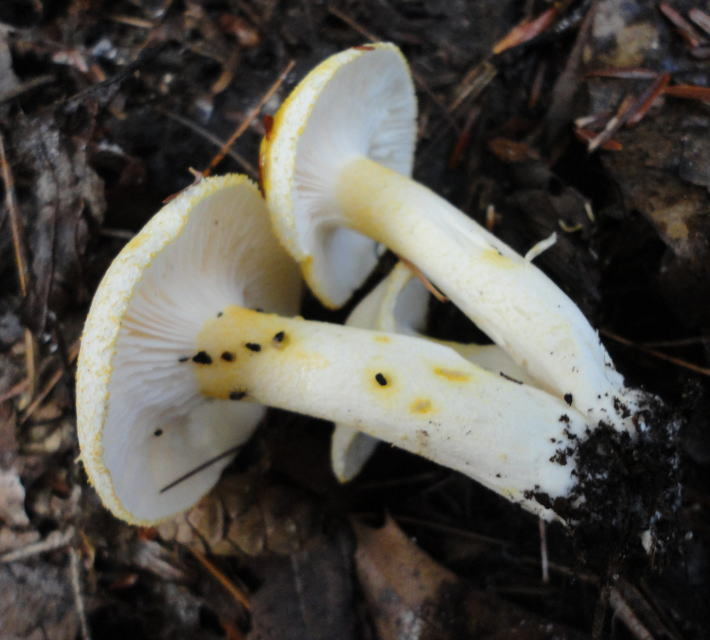

Scientific classification
- Kingdom: Fungi
- Division: Basidiomycota
- Class: Agaricomycetes
- Order: Agaricales
- Family: Hygrophoraceae
- Genus: Hygrophorus
- Species: H. chrysodon

Binomial name
- Hygrophorus chrysodon (Batsch) Fr., 1838

= Hygrophorus chrysodon =

Species of fungus

Hygrophorus chrysodon, commonly known as the flaky waxy cap, gold dust waxy cap, or gold flecked woodwax, is a species of fungus in the genus Hygrophorus. The species is found throughout the Northern Hemisphere. It is edible but bland in taste.

== Etymology ==
The specific epithet chrysodon is Greek for 'golden tooth', a reference to the species' gold-hued granules or hairs, which are found on the cap (especially near the edge), stipe, and gills.

== Description ==
The fruit bodies are white, sometimes with a tinge of yellow. The caps reach 4–14 centimetres (1 1/2–5 1/2 inches), with gills subdecurrent to decurrent. The stalk is 3–10 cm long.

The flesh is soft and white, with a mild to bitter taste. The spore print is white.

=== Similar species ===
Lookalikes in the genus include the uncommon H. discoxanthus.

== Distribution and habitat ==
Hygrophorus chrysodon
- Mycological characteristics
- Gills on hymenium
- Cap is convex or flat
- Hymenium is subdecurrent or decurrent
- Stipe is bare
- Spore print is white
- Ecology is mycorrhizal
- Edibility is edible or edible, but unpalatable

The species is found throughout the Northern Hemisphere on the ground, with moss, and under conifers or other hardwood trees.

== Uses ==
It is edible but bland in taste.
