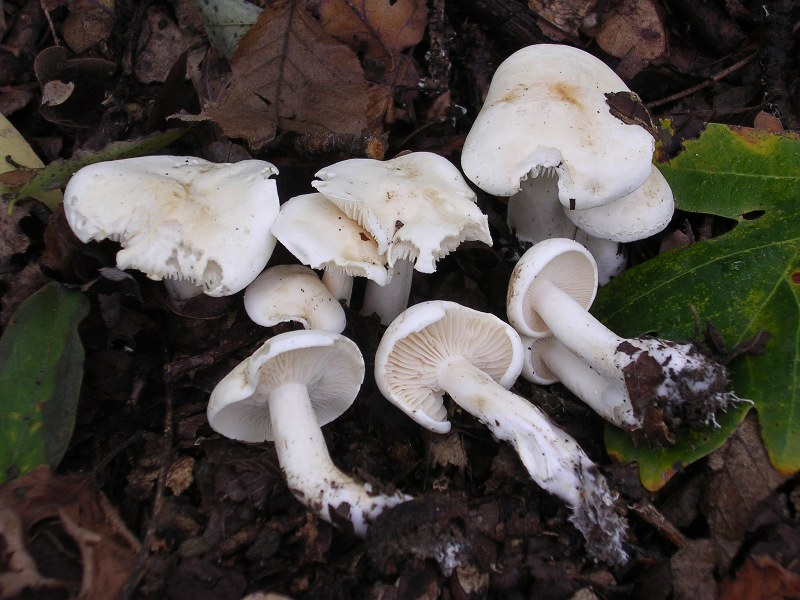

Scientific classification
- Domain: Eukaryota
- Kingdom: Fungi
- Division: Basidiomycota
- Class: Agaricomycetes
- Order: Agaricales
- Family: Hygrophoraceae
- Genus: Hygrophorus
- Species: H. cossus

Binomial name
- Hygrophorus cossus (Sowerby) Fr., 1838

= Hygrophorus cossus =

Species of fungus

Hygrophorus cossus is a species of fungus in the genus Hygrophorus. It is known for having a white color with a brownish tinge on its fruiting body.
