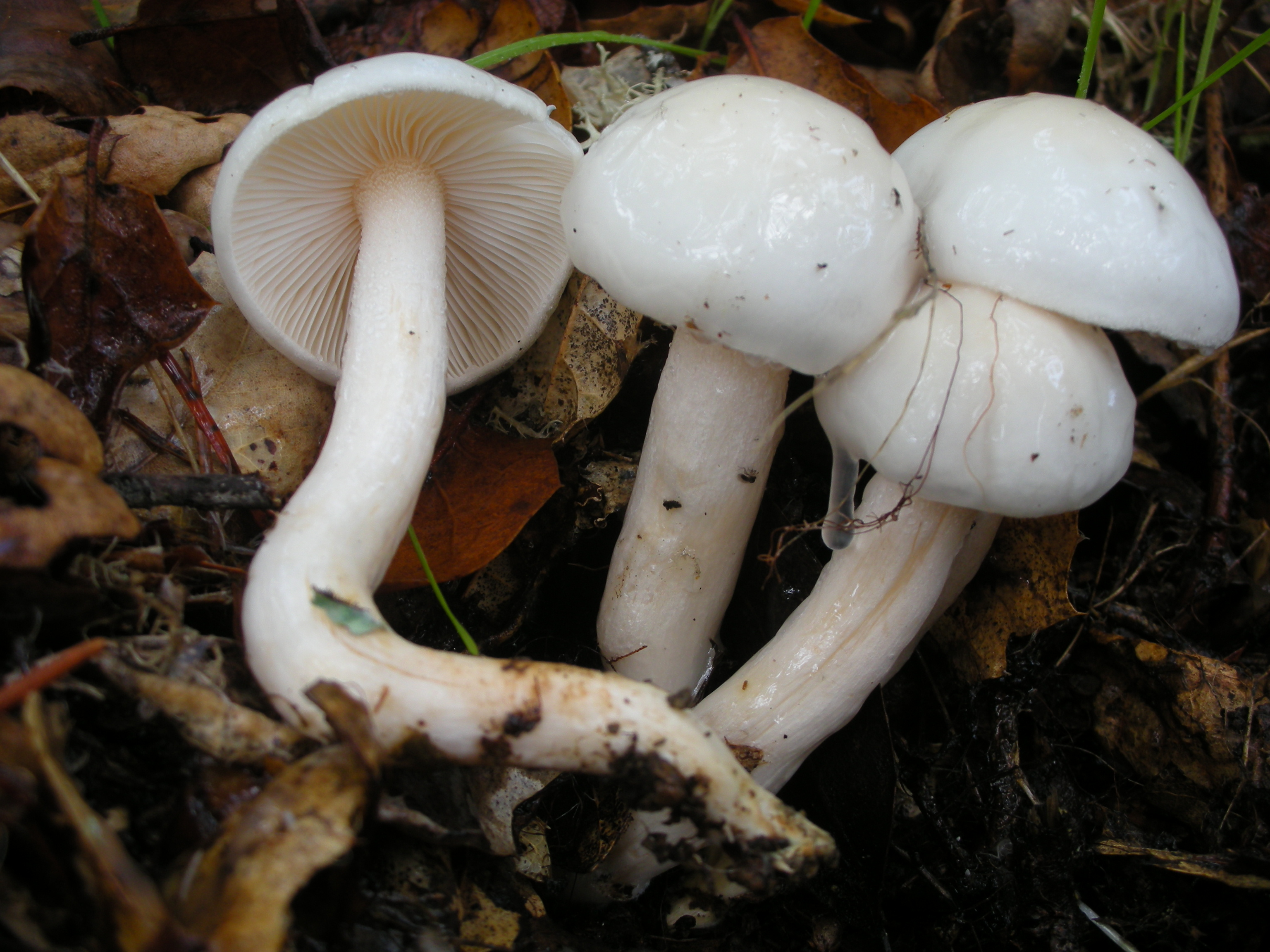
- Hygrophorus eburneus

Scientific classification
- Domain: Eukaryota
- Kingdom: Fungi
- Division: Basidiomycota
- Class: Agaricomycetes
- Order: Agaricales
- Family: Hygrophoraceae
- Genus: Hygrophorus; Fr. (1836)

Type species
- Hygrophorus eburneus (Bull.) Fr. (1838)

Synonyms
- Camarophyllus (Fr.) P.Kumm. (1871); Limacium (Fr. ex Rabenh.) P.Kumm. (1871)

= Hygrophorus =

Genus of fungi

Hygrophorus is a genus of agarics (gilled mushrooms) in the family Hygrophoraceae. Called "woodwaxes" in the UK or "waxy caps" (together with Hygrocybe species) in North America, basidiocarps (fruit bodies) are typically fleshy, often with slimy caps and lamellae that are broadly attached to decurrent. All species are ground-dwelling and ectomycorrhizal (forming an association with living trees) and are typically found in woodland. Around 100 species are recognized worldwide. Fruit bodies of several species are considered edible and are sometimes offered for sale in local markets.

== Taxonomy ==
=== History ===
Hygrophorus was first published in 1836 by Swedish mycologist Elias Magnus Fries. The generic name is derived from the Greek ῦγρὁς (= moist) + φόρος (= bearer), with reference to the slimy caps found in many species. Fries (1849) subsequently split the genus into three subgenera: Limacium, Camarophyllus, and Hygrocybe. The last of these is now recognized as a genus in its own right, but was frequently included within Hygrophorus until the 1970s. Camarophyllus (type species Hygrophorus camarophyllus) and Limacium were also raised to the rank of genus, but are regarded as synonyms of Hygrophorus. Camarophyllus sensu Singer (based on Hygrocybe pratensis) is, however, a synonym of Hygrocybe (or Cuphophyllus).

=== Current status ===
Recent molecular research, based on cladistic analysis of DNA sequences, suggests that Hygrophorus (minus Hygrocybe) is a monophyletic (and hence natural) genus. Only a few species, however, have been sequenced to date.

No comprehensive monograph of the genus has yet been published. In Europe, however, species of Hygrophorus have been illustrated and described in an Italian guide by Candusso (1997). European species have also been covered, more briefly, in descriptive French keys by Bon (1990). Dutch species were illustrated and described by Arnolds (1990). No equivalent modern guides have been published for North America, the most recent being by Hesler & Smith (1963). There is, however, a guide to Californian species by Largent (1985). In Australia, Hygrophorus species have been illustrated and described by Young (2005) and in New Zealand by Horak (1990).

Hygrophorus paupertinus Sm. & Hesl. has a strong, penetrating fecal-like odor. Chemical analysis shows that three odoriferous compounds; 1-octen-3-ol, indole and 3-chloroindole are emitted from sporocarps. Indole and 3-chloroindole have fecal-like odors. This is the first identification of 3-chloroindole from a terrestrial organism.

=== Species ===
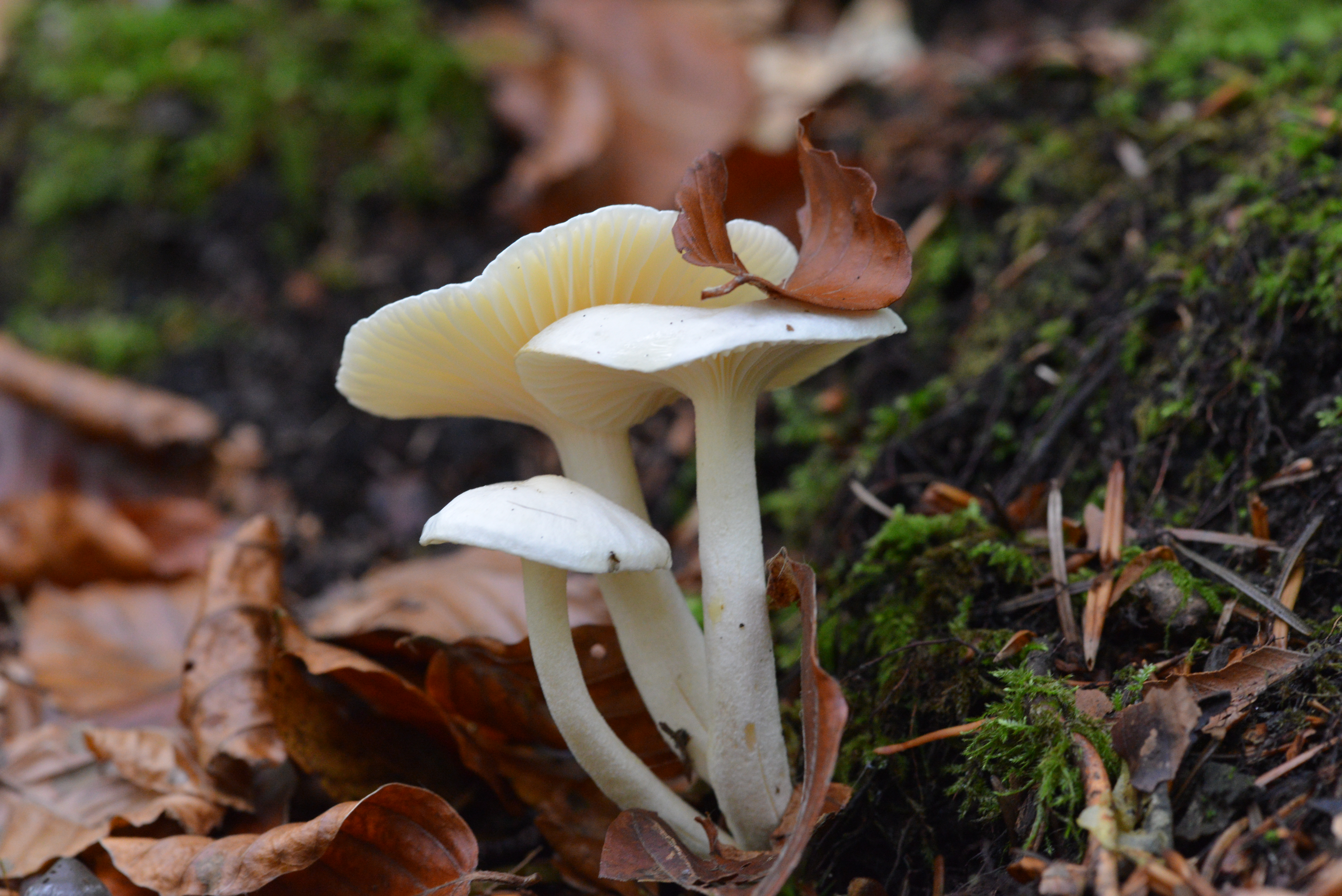
Hygrophorus eburneus

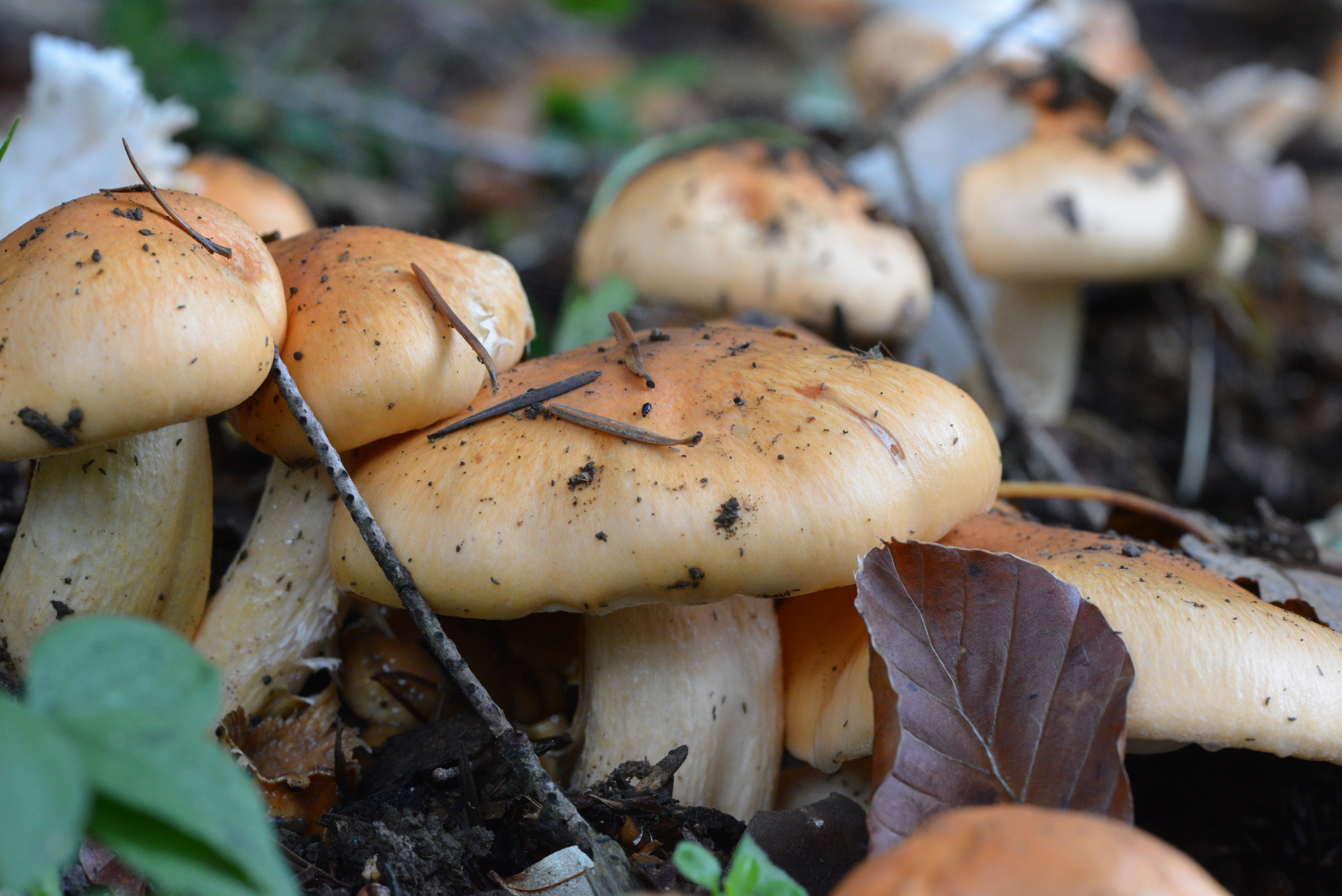
H. pudorinus

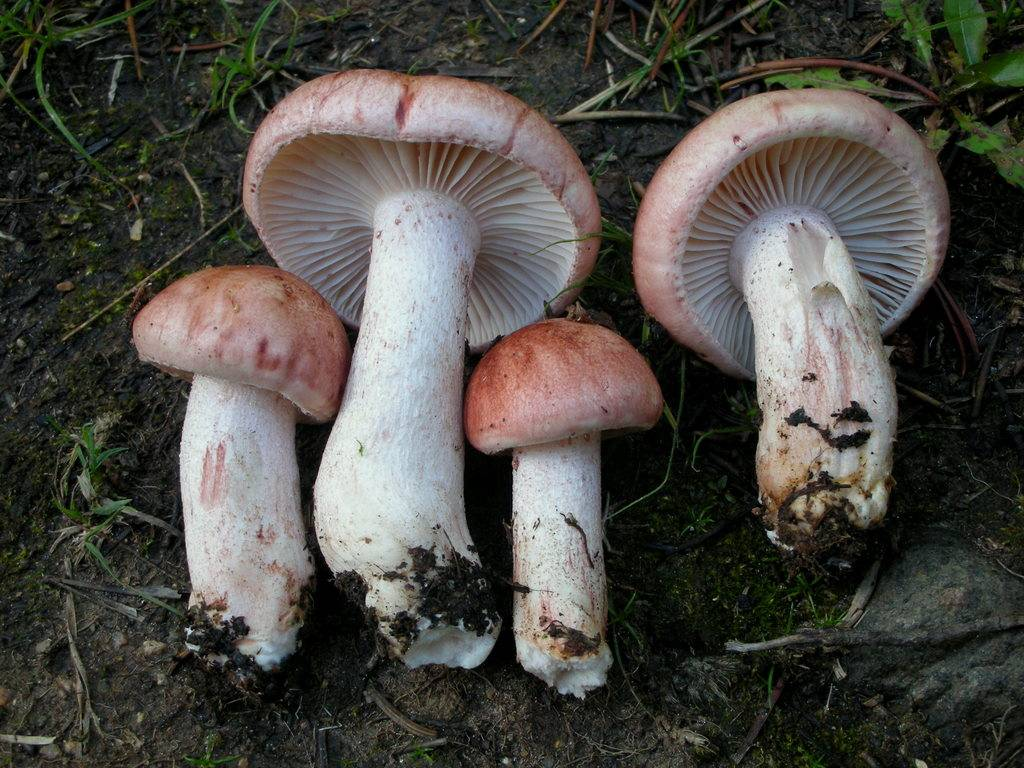
H. erubescens

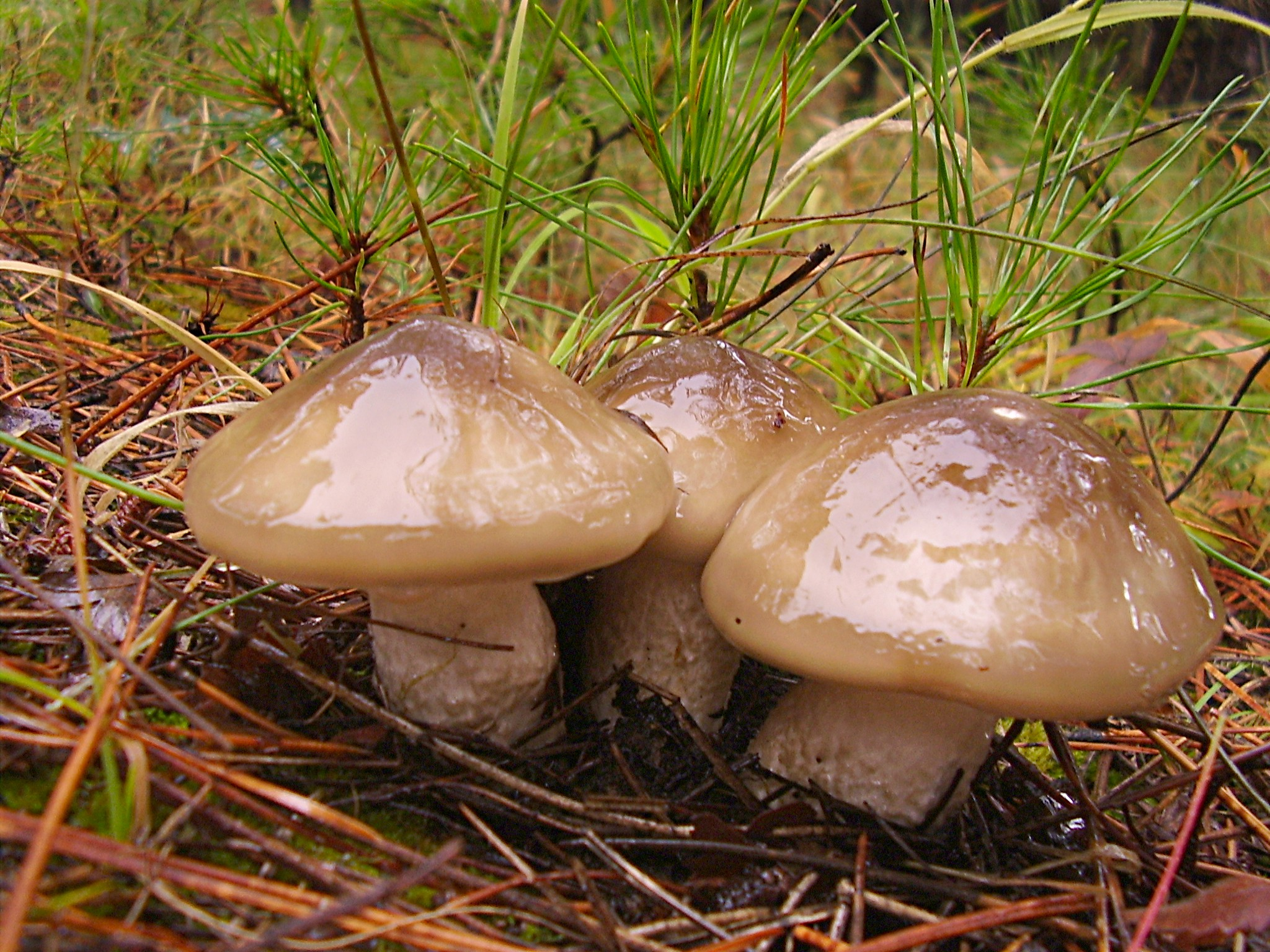
H. latitabundus

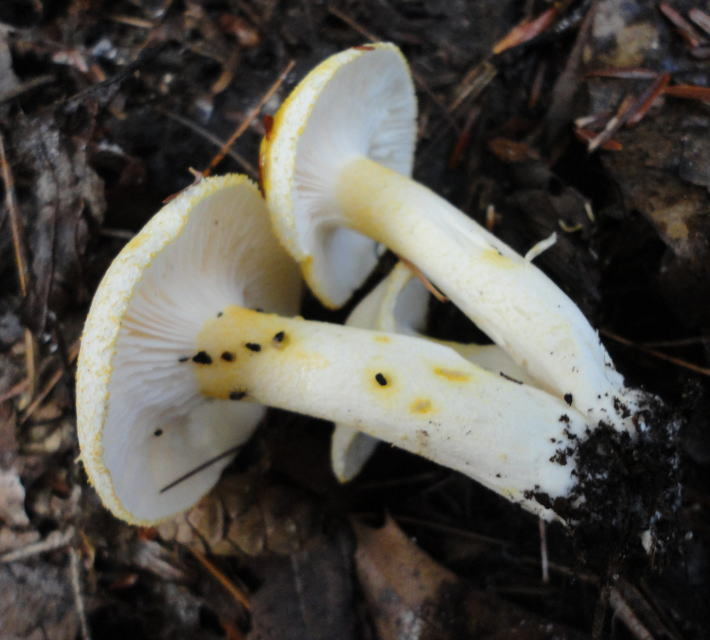
H. chrysodon

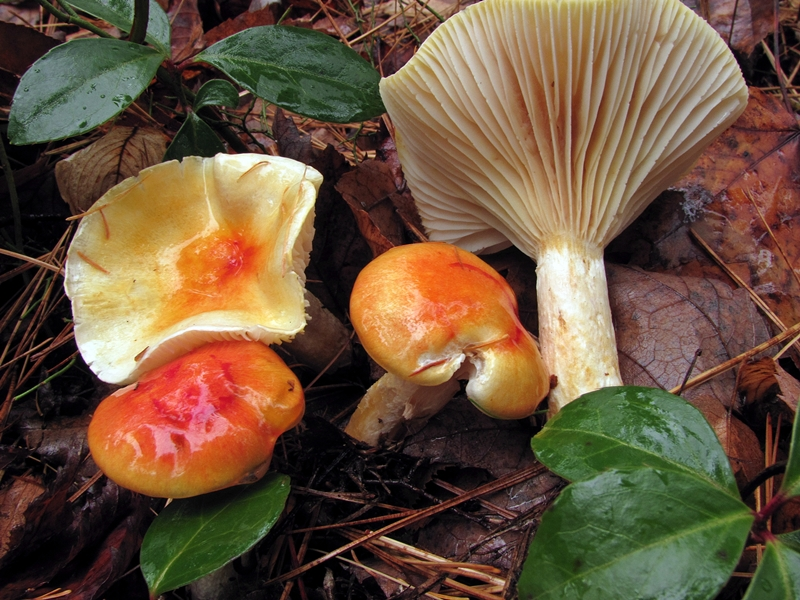
H. speciosus

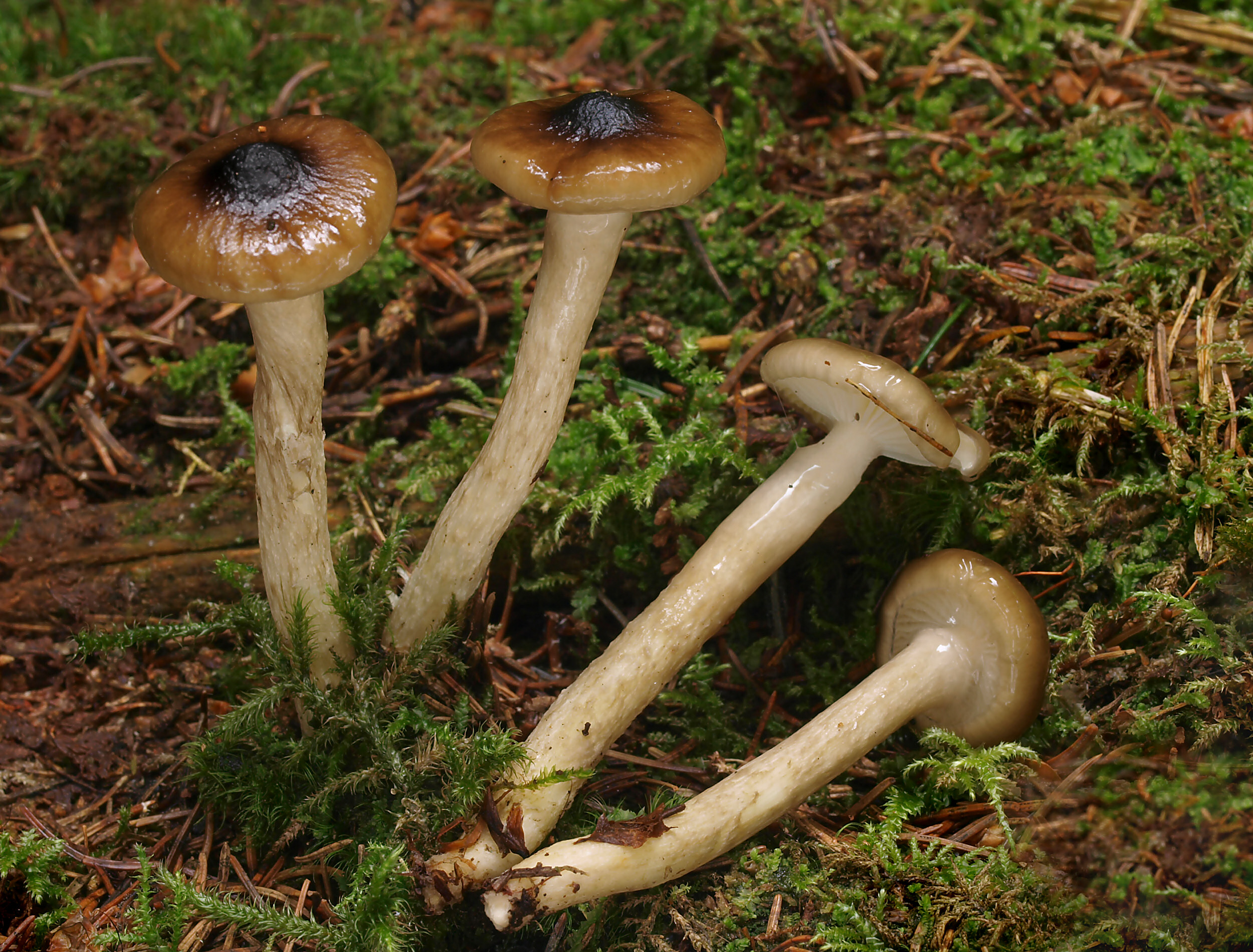
H. olivaceoalbus

== Description ==
Fruit bodies of Hygrophorus species are all agaricoid, most (but not all) having smooth caps that are viscid to glutinous when damp. The lamellae beneath the cap are usually distant, thick, waxy, and broadly attached to decurrent. The stems of Hygrophorus species often have traces of a glutinous veil, sometimes forming an equally glutinous ring or ring-zone. The spore print is white. Microscopically, Hygrocybe species lack true cystidia and have smooth, inamyloid basidiospores.

== Habitat and distribution ==
Species of Hygrophorus are ectomycorrhizal, most forming associations with trees (both broadleaf and conifer) and hence typically found in woodlands. Many appear to be host specific, Hygrophorus cossus, for example, occurring with oak and H. speciosus with larch.

Species are distributed worldwide, from the tropics to the sub-polar regions. Around 100 have been described to date.

== Uses ==
Fruit bodies of a few species are considered edible and are collected and consumed locally (sometimes sold in markets) in Spain and eastern Europe, China and Bhutan, and Central America .

== See also ==
- List of Agaricales genera
