= List of Entoloma species =

A B C D E F G H I J K L M N O P Q R S T U V W X Y Z

The following list of species in the genus Entoloma. There are over 2000 species fungi recognised in the genus with many species formerly classified in the genera Rhodocybe, Clitopilus, Richoniella, and Rhodogaster that were formally transferred to Entoloma as a result of molecular analysis published in 2009.

== A ==
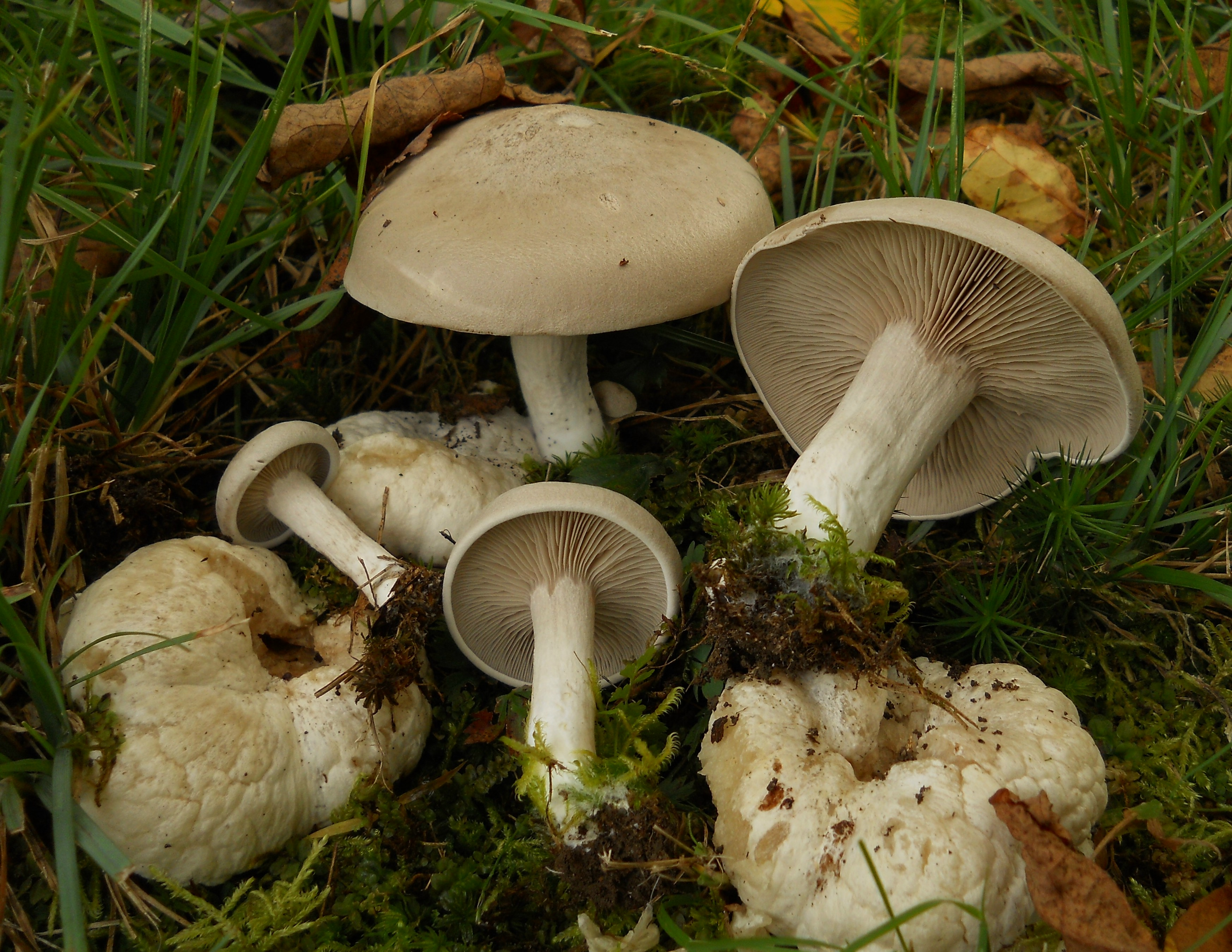
Entoloma abortivum

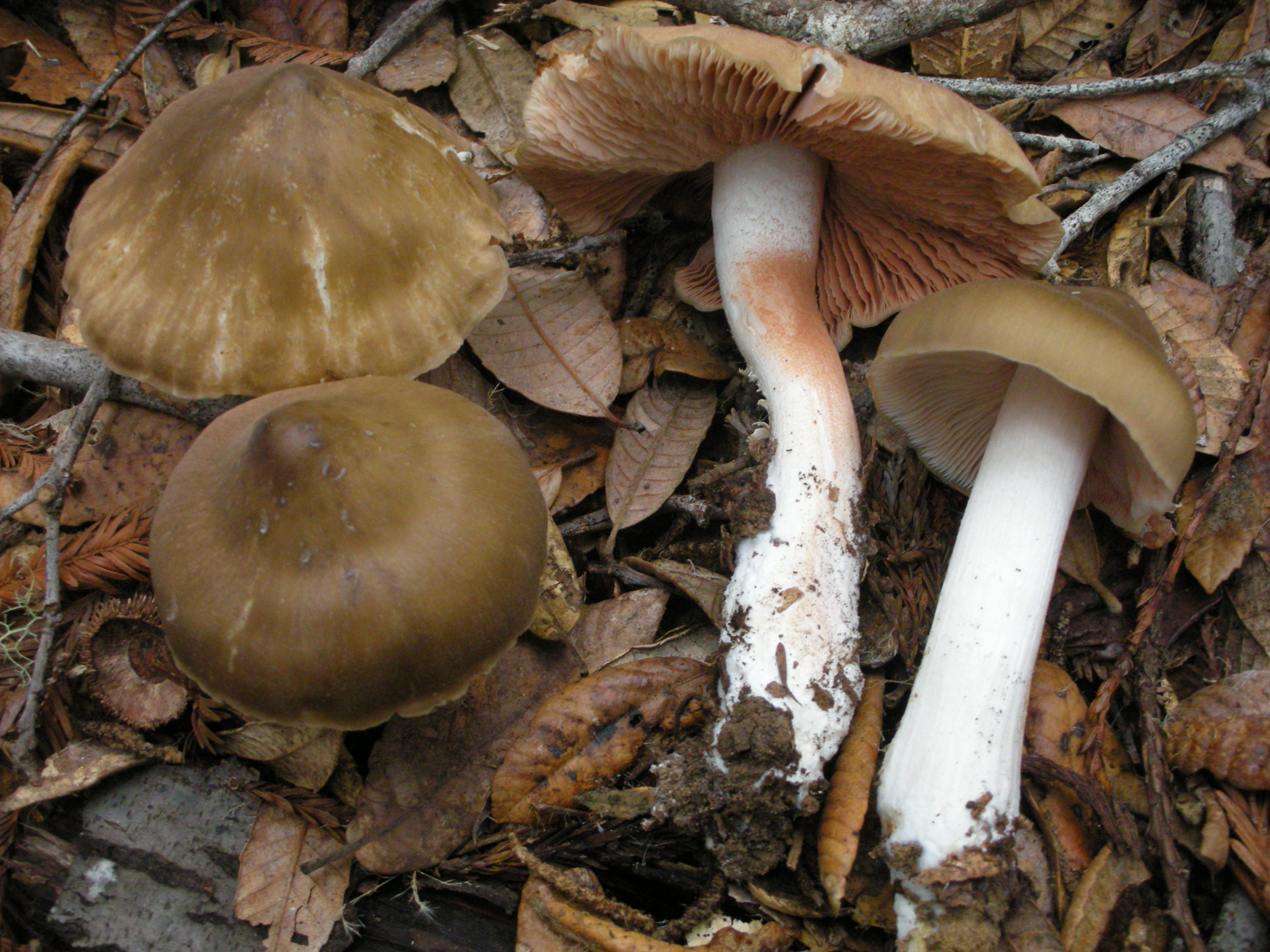
Entoloma aprile

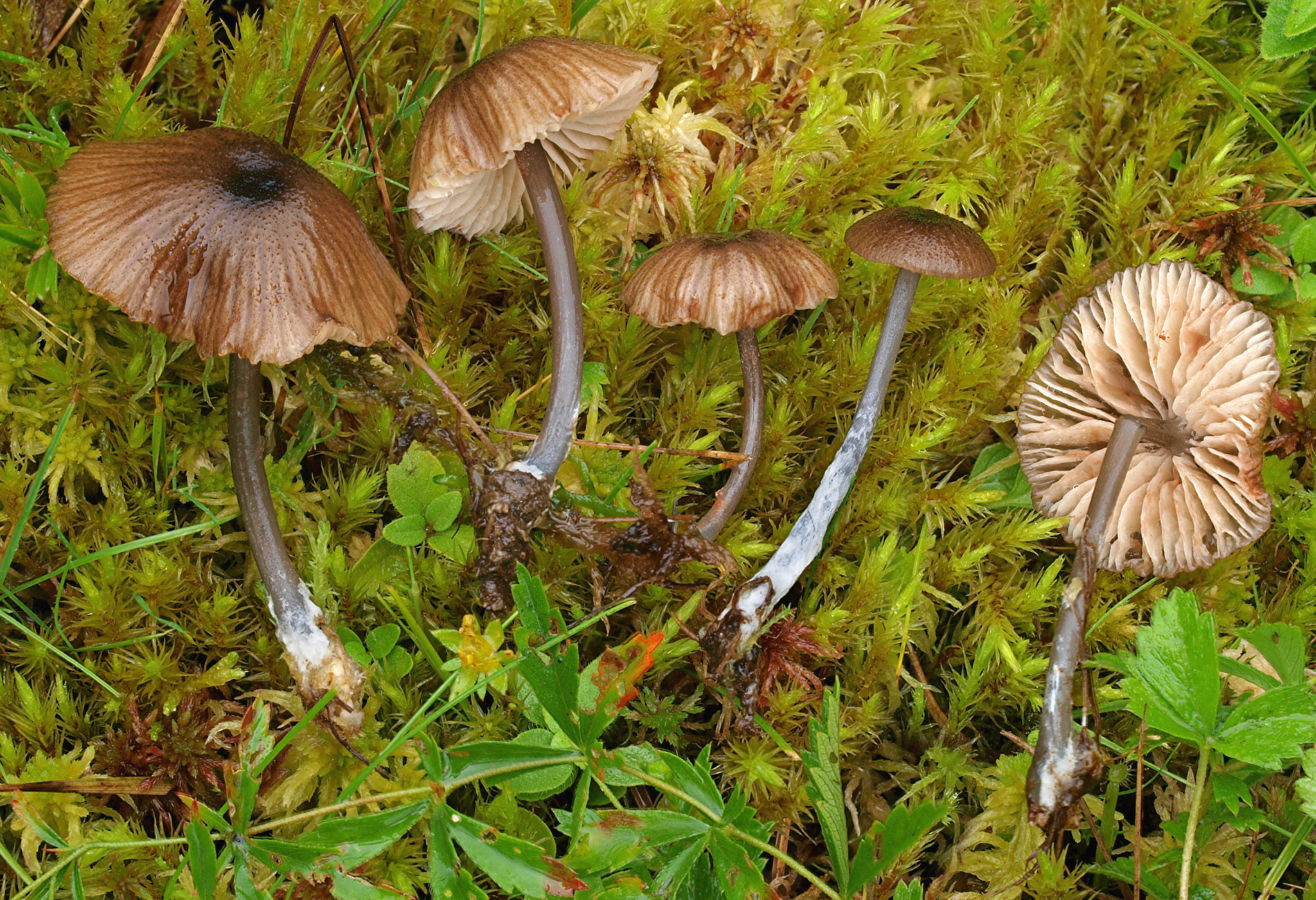
Entoloma asprellum

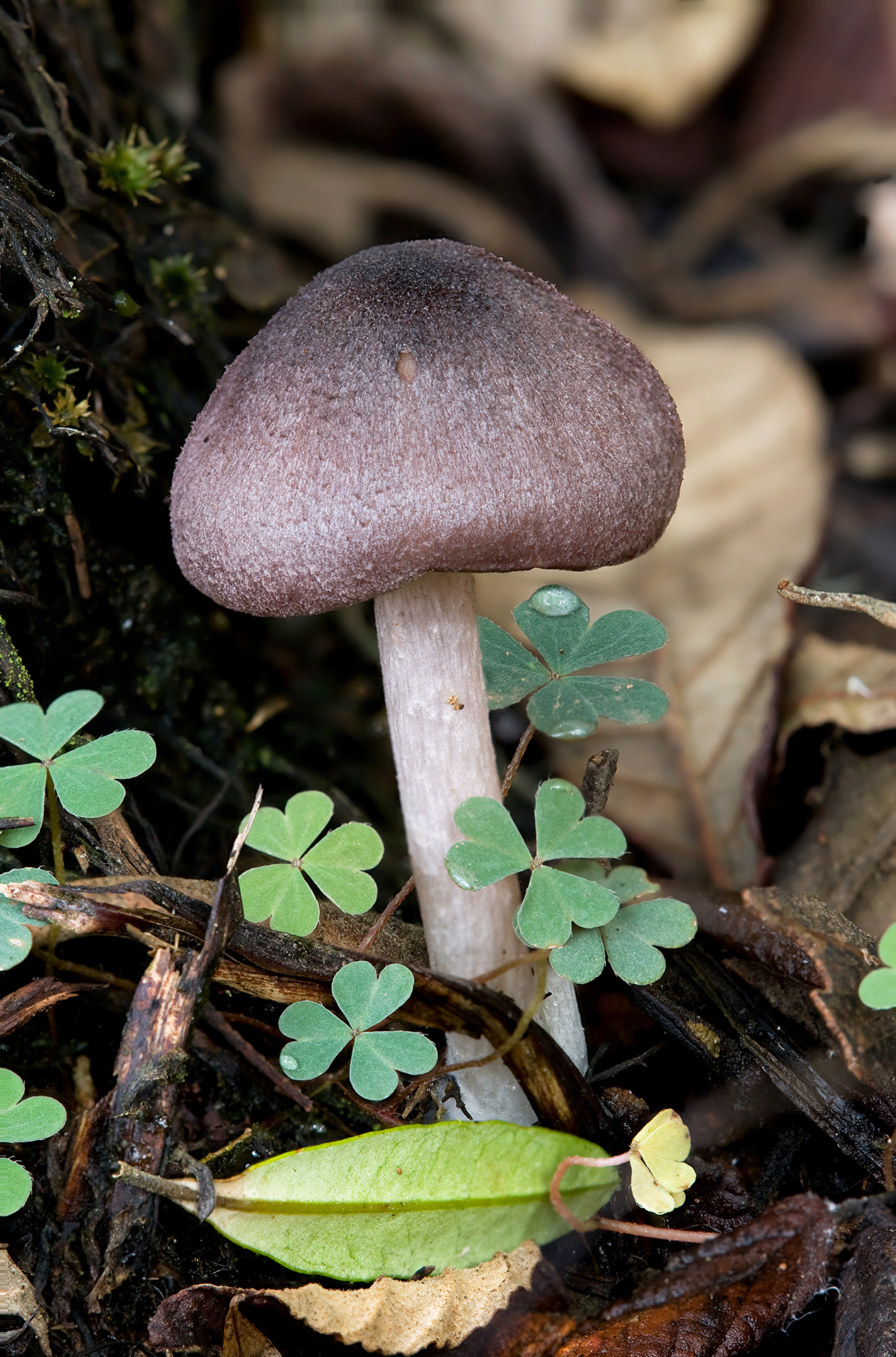
Entoloma austroprunicolor

- Entoloma abbreviatipes (Largent) Noordel. & Co-David (2009)
- Entoloma aberrans E. Horak (1973)
- Entoloma abnorme (Peck) Noordel. (2008)
- Entoloma abortivum (Berk. & M.A. Curtis) Donk (1949)
- Entoloma accline (Britzelm.) Sacc. (1887)
- Entoloma accola (Britzelm.) Sacc. (1887)
- Entoloma acericola (Murrill) Blanco-Dios (2017)
- Entoloma aciculocystis (Romagn. & Gilles) Noordel. & Co-David (2009)
- Entoloma acidophilum Arnolds & Noordel. (1979)
- Entoloma acuferum (Romagn. & Gilles) Noordel. & Co-David (2009)
- Entoloma acuminatum E. Horak (1980)
- Entoloma acuticystidiosum E. Horak (1973)
- Entoloma acutipallidum E. Horak & Cheype (2010)
- Entoloma acutipes Largent (1994)
- Entoloma acutoconicum (Hongo) E. Horak (1976)
- Entoloma acutomycenoides Eyssart. & Buyck (2014)
- Entoloma acutoumbonatum (Largent) Noordel. & Co-David (2009)
- Entoloma acutum (Romagn. & Gilles) Noordel. & Co-David (2009)
- Entoloma adalbertii Romagn. (1987)
- Entoloma adirondackense Murrill (1917)
- Entoloma adnatifolium (Murrill) Blanco-Dios (2015)
- Entoloma aeruginosum Hiroë (1939)
- Entoloma aethiops (Scop.) G. Stev. (1962)
- Entoloma affine (Kauffman) Blanco-Dios (2017)
- Entoloma africanum (Maire) Blanco-Dios (2017)
- Entoloma afrum (Pegler) Noordel. & Co-David (2009)
- Entoloma aimeae Blanco-Dios (2015)
- Entoloma alabamense (Murrill) Hesler (1967)
- Entoloma alachuanum Murrill (1941)
- Entoloma albatum Hesler (1967)
- Entoloma albellum (Romagn.) Singer (1986)
- Entoloma albidiforme Murrill (1945)
- Entoloma albidocoeruleum G.M. Gates & Noordel. (2007)
- Entoloma albidoquadratum Manim. & Noordel. (2006)
- Entoloma albidosimulans G.M. Gates & Noordel. (2007)
- Entoloma albidum Murrill (1917)
- Entoloma albinellum (Peck) (1967)
- Entoloma albipes Hesler (1967)
- Entoloma albivellum (Romagn. & Gilles) Noordel. & Co-David (2009)
- Entoloma alboconicum Dennis (1961)
- Entoloma albocrenulatum E. Horak (1980)
- Entoloma alboflavidum Rick (1930)
- Entoloma albofumeum Hesler (1967)
- Entoloma albogracile E. Horak (1976)
- Entoloma albogranulosum Noordel. & Hauskn. (2002)
- Entoloma albogriseum (Peck) Redhead (1979)
- Entoloma albomagnum G.M. Gates & Noordel. (2007)
- Entoloma albomurinum (Romagn. & Gilles) Noordel. & Co-David (2009)
- Entoloma alboproximum (Largent, Aime & T.W. Henkel) Mešić & Tkalčec (2016)
- Entoloma alboroseum (Romagn. & Gilles) Noordel. & Co-David (2009)
- Entoloma albosericeum Hesler (1974)
- Entoloma alboserrulatum (Rick) Blanco-Dios (2017)
- Entoloma albostrigosum (Largent & Abell-Davis) Blanco-Dios (2015)
- Entoloma albosulcatum Corner & E. Horak (1980)
- Entoloma albotomentosum Noordel. & Hauskn. (1989)
- Entoloma alboumbonatum Hesler (1967)
- Entoloma album Hiroë (1939)
- Entoloma alcalinum Murrill (1917)
- Entoloma alcedicolor Arnolds & Noordel. (2004)
- Entoloma aliquantulum E. Horak (1980)
- Entoloma alissae (Largent & Bergemann) Blanco-Dios (2016)
- Entoloma alium Corner & E. Horak (1980)
- Entoloma alliodorum Esteve-Rav., E. Horak & A. Ortega (2003)
- Entoloma allochroum Noordel. (1982)
- Entoloma allosericellum Noordel. (1988)
- Entoloma allospermum Noordel. (1985)
- Entoloma almeriense J. Carbó, F. Caball., Vila & Català (2014)
- Entoloma alnetorum Monthoux & Röllin (1988)
- Entoloma alnicola Noordel. & Polemis (2008)
- Entoloma alnobetulae (Kühner) Noordel. (1981)
- Entoloma alpicola (J. Favre) Bon & Jamoni (1981)
- Entoloma alpinum Xiao L. He, W.H. Peng & B.C. Gan (2015)
- Entoloma altaicum O.V. Morozova, Reschke, Noordel. & Ageev (2022)
- Entoloma altissimum (Massee) E. Horak (1976)
- Entoloma alutaceum Murrill (1917)
- Entoloma alutae E. Horak (1980)
- Entoloma alvarense Noordel. & Vauras (2004)
- Entoloma amarum Noordel. & G.M. Gates (2012)
- Entoloma ambiguum (Romagn. & Gilles) Noordel. & Co-David (2009)
- Entoloma ambrosium (Quél.) Noordel. (1980)
- Entoloma ameides (Berk. & Broome) Sacc. (1887)
- Entoloma amicorum Noordel. (1987)
- Entoloma amistadosericellum Reschke & Noordel. (2022)
- Entoloma ammophilum G.M. Jansen, Dima, Noordel. & Vila (2021)
- Entoloma amplisporum Corner & E. Horak (1980)
- Entoloma amygdalinum Noordel. (1987)
- Entoloma anamikum Manim., A.V. Joseph & Leelav. (1995)
- Entoloma anastomosans (Rick) Raithelh. (1991)
- Entoloma anatinum (Lasch) Donk (1949)
- Entoloma andersonii (Mazzer) Noordel. & Co-David (2009)
- Entoloma andinum Dennis (1961)
- Entoloma angulatum (Cleland) Grgur. (1997)
- Entoloma angustifolium Murrill (1917)
- Entoloma angustispermum Noordel. & O.V. Morozova (2010)
- Entoloma angustisporum (Romagn. & Gilles) Noordel. & Co-David (2009)
- Entoloma anisatum Arnolds (2015)
- Entoloma anisothrix (Romagn. & Gilles) Noordel. & Co-David (2009)
- Entoloma anodinum Vila, Carbó, Valero, Reschke & Noordel. (2021)
- Entoloma anthracinellum (M. Lange) Noordel. (1984)
- Entoloma anthracinum (J. Favre) Noordel. (1981)
- Entoloma antillancae E. Horak (1978)
- Entoloma apiculatum (Fr.) Noordel. (1981)
- Entoloma appalachianense Hesler (1967)
- Entoloma appendiculatum E. Horak (1980)
- Entoloma applanatum (Romagn. & Gilles) Noordel. & Co-David (2009)
- Entoloma appositivum (Britzelm.) Sacc. (1887)
- Entoloma appositum (Britzelm.) Sacc. (1910)
- Entoloma approximatum (Largent) Noordel. & Co-David (2009)
- Entoloma apressum (Largent) Blanco-Dios (2024)
- Entoloma aprile (Britzelm.) Sacc. (1887)
- Entoloma arachnoideus (Berk. & M.A. Curtis) Singer (1986)
- Entoloma aranense F. Caball. & Vila (2013)
- Entoloma araneosum (Quél.) M.M. Moser (1978)
- Entoloma arcanum Reschke & Noordel. (2022)
- Entoloma arcuatum (Romagn. & Gilles) Noordel. & Co-David (2009)
- Entoloma ardosiacum (Bull.) Quél. (1872)
- Entoloma argenteolanatum (T.J. Baroni, Perd.-Sánch. & S.A. Cantrell) Noordel. & Co-David (2009)
- Entoloma argenteostriatum Arnolds & Noordel. (1979)
- Entoloma argentinense (Speg.) Blanco-Dios (2015)
- Entoloma argentinum (Speg.) E. Horak (1978)
- Entoloma argillaceum O.V. Morozova, Reschke, Corriol, Noordel., Zvyagina, E.F. Malysheva & Svetash. (2022)
- Entoloma argus O.V. Morozova, E.S. Popov, A.V. Alexandrova & Noordel. (2022)
- Entoloma argyropelle (Pegler) Courtec. & Fiard (2004)
- Entoloma argyropus (Alb. & Schwein.) P. Kumm. (1871)
- Entoloma arion O.V. Morozova, E.S. Popov, T.H.G. Pham & Noordel. (2022)
- Entoloma aripoanum Dennis (1953)
- Entoloma armoricanum Hériveau & Courtec. (1995)
- Entoloma aromaticum E. Horak (1973)
- Entoloma arvigenum Corner & E. Horak (1980)
- Entoloma asperum E. Ludw., Hensel & M. Huth (2007)
- Entoloma asprelloides G. Stev. (1962)
- Entoloma asprellopsis G.M. Gates & Noordel. (2009)
- Entoloma asprellum (Fr.) Fayod (1889)
- Entoloma assiduum Vila, Reschke, Corriol, Polemis & Loizides (2021)
- Entoloma assimulatum Corner & E. Horak (1980)
- Entoloma assularum (Berk. & M.A. Curtis) Hesler (1967)
- Entoloma asterospermum (Romagn. & Gilles) Noordel. & Co-David (2009)
- Entoloma asterosporum (Coker & Couch) T.J. Baroni & Matheny (2011)
- Entoloma atlanticum G. Tassi (2003)
- Entoloma atrellum E. Horak (1973)
- Entoloma atricolor O.V. Morozova, Noordel., E.S. Popov & A.V. Alexandrova (2020)
- Entoloma atrifucatum (Largent) Noordel. & Co-David (2009)
- Entoloma atripes (Dennis) E. Horak (1978)
- Entoloma atrobrunneum Murrill (1917)
- Entoloma atrocoeruleum Noordel. (1987)
- Entoloma atroenigmaticum Noordel. & Hauskn. (2002)
- Entoloma atrofissuratum Noordel. & Wölfel (2001)
- Entoloma atrogriseum Largent (1994)
- Entoloma atromadidum A.M. Ainsw. & B. Douglas (2018)
- Entoloma atromarginatum (Romagn. & J. Favre) Zschiesch. (1984)
- Entoloma atropapillatum (Karstedt & Capelari) Blanco-Dios (2020)
- Entoloma atropellitum (J. Favre) Bon & Courtec. (1987)
- Entoloma atropileatum Dennis (1961)
- Entoloma atrosericeum (Kühner) Noordel. (1981)
- Entoloma atrosquamosum (Murrill) Hesler (1967)
- Entoloma atrostipitatum (Henn.) Blanco-Dios (2017)
- Entoloma atrovelutinum (Romagn. & Gilles) Noordel. & Co-David (2009)
- Entoloma atroviolaceum (Romagn.) Noordel. & Co-David (2009)
- Entoloma atrum (Hongo) Hongo (2010)
- Entoloma atypicum (E. Horak) Noordel. & Co-David (2009)
- Entoloma aurantiacum Z.S. Bi (1986)
- Entoloma aurantioalbum Corner & E. Horak (1976)
- Entoloma aurantioalpinum Armada, Vila, Bellanger, Noordel., Krisai & Dima (2022)
- Entoloma aurantiobrunneum Hesler (1967)
- Entoloma aurantiolabes G.M. Gates & Noordel. (2007)
- Entoloma aurantioquadratum C.K. Pradeep & K.B. Vrinda (2012)
- Entoloma aurantiovirescens Reschke, Lotz-Winter & Noordel. (2022)
- Entoloma aurantipes E. Horak (1980)
- Entoloma aurantium (Manim. & Leelav.) Manim., A.V. Joseph & Leelav. (1995)
- Entoloma aureocrinitum (E. Horak) Blanco-Dios (2015)
- Entoloma aurorae-borealis Noordel., Weholt, Eidissen & Lorås (2018)
- Entoloma australe (Murrill) Hesler (1967)
- Entoloma australiense Blanco-Dios (2015)
- Entoloma austriacum Courtec. (1993)
- Entoloma austroanatinum (Singer) E. Horak (1978)
- Entoloma austronitens Noordel. & G.M. Gates (2012)
- Entoloma austroprunicolor G.M. Gates & Noordel. (2007)
- Entoloma austrorhodocalyx G.M. Gates & Noordel. (2007)
- Entoloma austroroseum G.M. Gates & Noordel. (2007)
- Entoloma austrosarcitulum Noordel. & G.M. Gates (2013)
- Entoloma autumnale Velen. (1940)
- Entoloma avellaneosquamosum Hesler (1967)
- Entoloma avellaneum Murrill (1917)
- Entoloma avellanicolor (Romagn. & Gilles) Noordel. & Co-David (2009)
- Entoloma avilanum (Dennis) E. Horak (1976)
- Entoloma azureocystidiatum Noordel. & Hauskn. (2015)
- Entoloma azureopallidum Corriol (2016)
- Entoloma azureosquamulosum Xiao L. He & T.H. Li (2012)
- Entoloma azureostipes E. Horak (1980)
- Entoloma azureoviride E. Horak & Singer (1982)
- Entoloma azureum (Largent) Noordel. & Co-David (2009)

== B ==
- Entoloma babingtonii (A. Bloxam) Hesler (1967)
- Entoloma badissimum (Largent) Noordel. & Co-David (2009)
- Entoloma badium (Rick) Blanco-Dios (2017)
- Entoloma baeosporum (Romagn.) Bon & Courtec. (1987)
- Entoloma bahusiense S. Lundell (1953)
- Entoloma bakeri Dennis (1953)
- Entoloma baronianum Blanco-Dios (2015)
- Entoloma baronii G.M. Gates & Noordel. (2012)
- Entoloma barringtonense Blanco-Dios (2015)
- Entoloma batschianum (Fr.) P. Karst. (1879)
- Entoloma beelii Blanco-Dios (2017)
- Entoloma belouvense Noordel. & Hauskn. (2007)
- Entoloma benedictinum Vila, Marulli, Battistin & Dima (2021)
- Entoloma bergemanniae Blanco-Dios (2016)
- Entoloma beyeri Noordel. & Wölfel (1995)
- Entoloma bicolor Murrill (1917)
- Entoloma bicoloripes (Largent & Thiers) Noordel. & Co-David (2009)
- Entoloma bicorne Noordel. (1984)
- Entoloma bidupense O.V. Morozova & E.S. Popov (2017)
- Entoloma bigeardii Barbier (1915)
- Entoloma bipellis Noordel. & T. Borgen (1984)
- Entoloma bipigmentatum Corriol (2016)
- Entoloma bisporiferum (Romagn. & Gilles) Noordel. & Co-David (2009)
- Entoloma bisporigerum (P.D. Orton) Noordel. (1979)
- Entoloma bisporum (Hongo) Hongo (2010)
- Entoloma bisterigmatum Largent, T.W. Henkel & R.A. Koch (2019)
- Entoloma bituminosum (Romagn. & Gilles) Noordel. & Co-David (2009)
- Entoloma blandfordii (Henn.) Singer (1986)
- Entoloma blandiodorum E. Horak (2008)
- Entoloma blandum Corner & E. Horak (1980)
- Entoloma bloxamii (Berk. & Broome) Sacc. (1887)
- Entoloma boardinghousense (Largent) Blanco-Dios (2015)
- Entoloma bogoriense (Henn. & E. Nyman) Blanco-Dios (2017)
- Entoloma bombycinum Corner & E. Horak (1980)
- Entoloma booranodes Grgur. (1997)
- Entoloma borbonicum Noordel. & Hauskn. (2007)
- Entoloma boreale Kokkonen (2015)
- Entoloma borgenii Noordel. (1984)
- Entoloma botanicum G. Stev. (1962)
- Entoloma brasilianum Blanco-Dios (2017)
- Entoloma brasiliense Blanco-Dios (2015)
- Entoloma brassicolens (D.A. Reid) Noordel. (1981)
- Entoloma brevipes Murrill (1917)
- Entoloma brevispermum G.M. Gates & Noordel. (2007)
- Entoloma brihadum Manim., A.V. Joseph & Leelav. (1995)
- Entoloma britannicum Blanco-Dios (2017)
- Entoloma broesarpense E. Ludw. & Noordel. (2004)
- Entoloma brunneicoeruleum O.V. Morozova, Noordel., Brandrud, J.B. Jordal & Dima (2021)
- Entoloma brunneipes Hesler (1967)
- Entoloma brunneoapplanatum K.N.A. Raj & Manim. (2016)
- Entoloma brunneocarnosum C.K. Pradeep & K.B. Vrinda (2013)
- Entoloma brunneocinereum Hesler (1967)
- Entoloma brunneofibrillosum Kaya, Kaygusuz, Reschke, Noordel., Dima, Vrba & M. Piepenbr. (2024)
- Entoloma brunneoflocculosum Arnolds & Noordel. (2004)
- Entoloma brunneogriseum (Rick) Blanco-Dios (2017)
- Entoloma brunneolamellatum (Largent) Noordel. & Co-David (2009)
- Entoloma brunneolilacinum E. Horak (1973)
- Entoloma brunneoloaurantiacum Largent & T.W. Henkel (2019)
- Entoloma brunneoloroseum (Romagn. & Gilles) Noordel. & Co-David (2009)
- Entoloma brunneolum Hesler (1967)
- Entoloma brunneomarginatum Hesler (1967)
- Entoloma brunneonigrescens (T.J. Baroni, Albertó, Niveiro & B.E. Lechner) Blanco-Dios (2015)
- Entoloma brunneopapillatum C.K. Pradeep & K.B. Vrinda (2013)
- Entoloma brunneoquadratum Manim. & Noordel. (2006)
- Entoloma brunneorugulosum Reschke, Noordel. & Lotz-Winter (2022)
- Entoloma brunneoserrulatum Eyssart. & Noordel. (2002)
- Entoloma brunneosquamulosum C.K. Pradeep & K.B. Vrinda (2013)
- Entoloma brunneostanneum Courtec. (1993)
- Entoloma brunneostriatum Dennis (1953)
- Entoloma brunneotubulum Noordel. & Hauskn. (2015)
- Entoloma brunneoumbonatum K.N.A. Raj & Manim. (2016)
- Entoloma brunnescipes Largent (1994)
- Entoloma brunneum Petch (1924)
- Entoloma bryorum Romagn. (1988)
- Entoloma bulakhae O.V. Morozova & Noordel. (2017)
- Entoloma bulbigenum (Berk. & Broome) Massee (1893)
- Entoloma burkilliae Massee (1914)
- Entoloma burlinghamiae Murrill (1917)
- Entoloma byssisedum (Pers.) Donk (1949)

== C ==
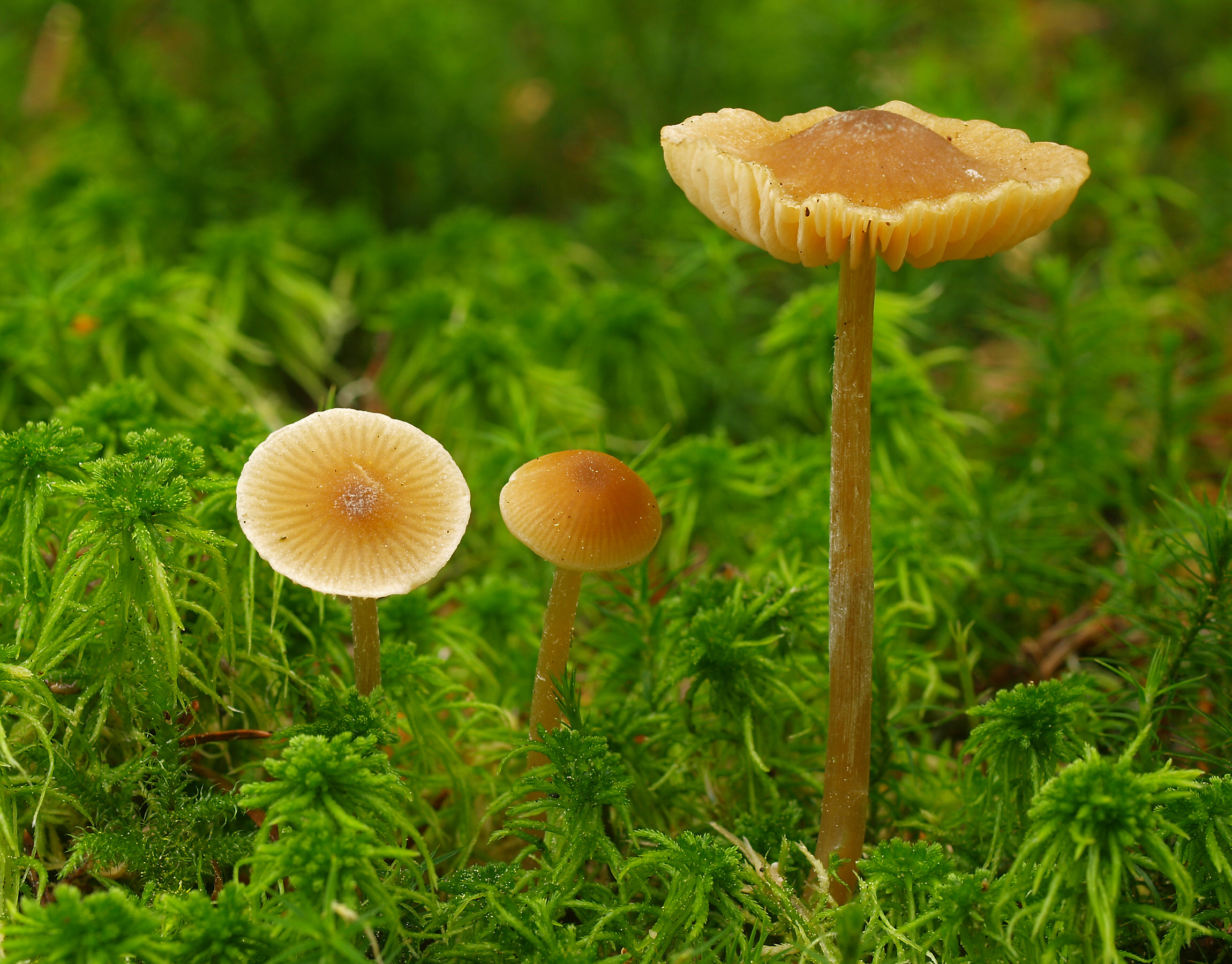
Entoloma cetratum

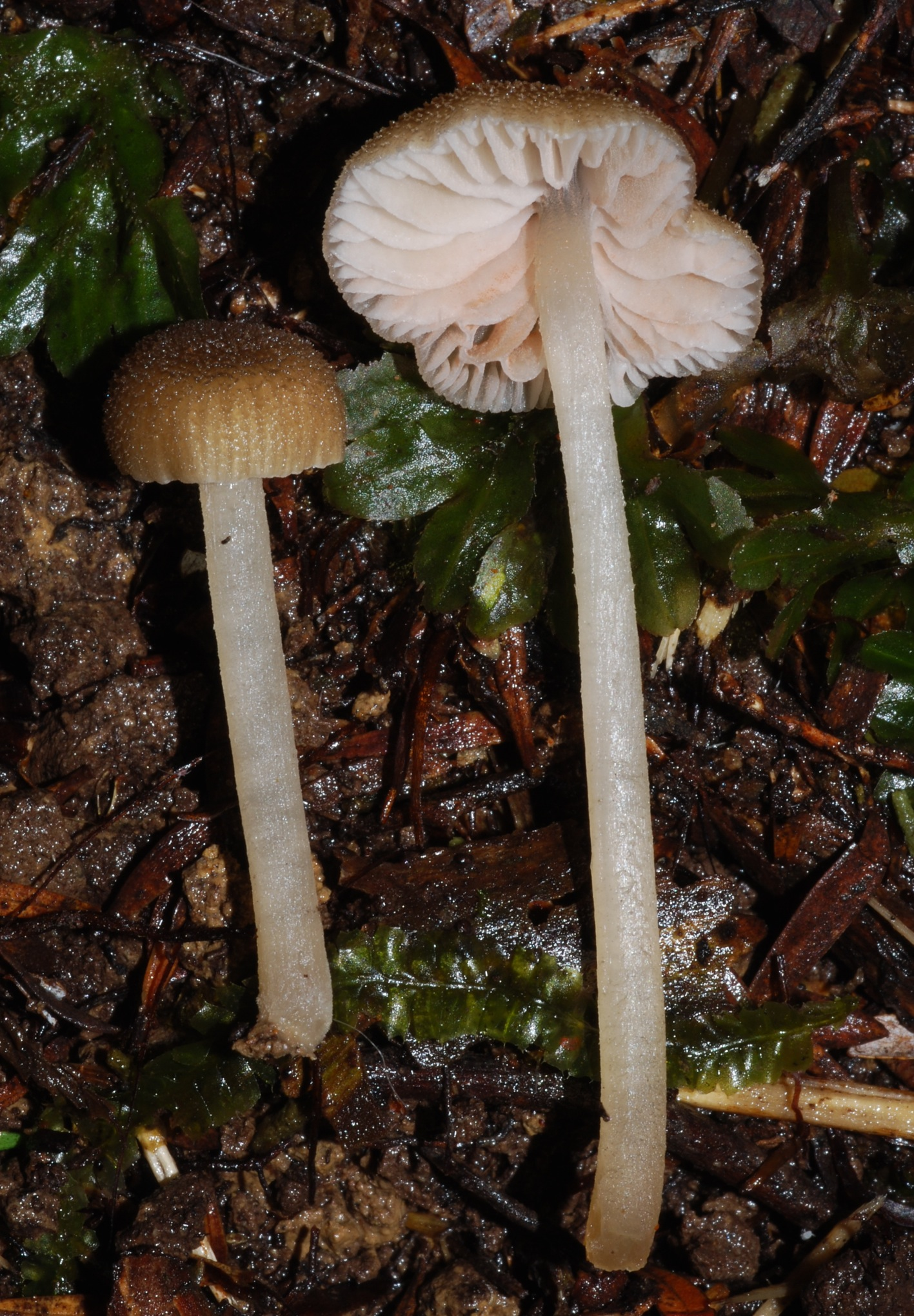
Entoloma corneum

- Entoloma caccabus (Kühner) Noordel. (1979)
- Entoloma caeruleocapitatum Dennis (1970)
- Entoloma caeruleoflavum T.H. Li & Xiao L. He (2012)
- Entoloma caeruleoflocculosum Noordel. (1985)
- Entoloma caeruleomarginatum Reschke, Manz & Noordel. (2022)
- Entoloma caeruleonigrum (Romagn. & Gilles) Noordel. & Co-David (2009)
- Entoloma caeruleopallescens Hesler (1967)
- Entoloma caeruleopinophilum Vila, Ribes & Dima (2021)
- Entoloma caeruleopolitum Noordel. & Brandt-Ped. (1984)
- Entoloma caeruleorubescens Hesler (1967)
- Entoloma caeruleosplendens (Largent, Aime & T.W. Henkel) Blanco-Dios (2015)
- Entoloma caeruleum (P.D. Orton) Noordel. (1982)
- Entoloma caesiellum Noordel. & Wölfel (1995)
- Entoloma caesiocinctum (Kühner) Noordel. (1982)
- Entoloma caesiocoeruleum E. Horak (1980)
- Entoloma caesiolamellatum (Wölfel & Noordel.) Noordel. & Morgado (2013)
- Entoloma caesiolimbatum (Romagn. & Gilles) Noordel. & Co-David (2009)
- Entoloma caesiomarginatum E. Horak (1973)
- Entoloma caesiomurinum (Romagn. & Gilles) Noordel. & Co-David (2009)
- Entoloma caesiopileum (Romagn. & Gilles) Noordel. & Co-David (2009)
- Entoloma caespitosum W.M. Zhang (1994)
- Entoloma calabrum Battistin, Marsico, Vizzini, Vila & Ercole (2015)
- Entoloma calaminare Noordel. (1984)
- Entoloma calceus Noordel., Bendiksen, Brandrud, P.-A. Moreau & Vila (2022)
- Entoloma caldariorum (Henn.) Blanco-Dios (2017)
- Entoloma californianum Blanco-Dios (2015)
- Entoloma californicum (Murrill) Blanco-Dios (2016)
- Entoloma californiense Blanco-Dios (2015)
- Entoloma caliginosum (Romagn. & J. Favre) Bon & Courtec. (1987)
- Entoloma calileguense Blanco-Dios (2015)
- Entoloma callichroum E. Horak & Noordel. (1983)
- Entoloma callidermoides (Romagn. & Gilles) Noordel. & Co-David (2009)
- Entoloma callipygmaeum O.V. Morozova, Noordel. & Dima (2021)
- Entoloma callirhodon Hauskn. & Noordel. (1999)
- Entoloma callithrix (Romagn. & Gilles) Noordel. & Co-David (2009)
- Entoloma calobrunneum F. Caball., Vila & Català (2013)
- Entoloma calongei (E. Horak & G. Moreno) Noordel. & Co-David (2009)
- Entoloma calthionis Arnolds & Noordel. (1979)
- Entoloma camarophyllus G.M. Gates & Noordel. (2007)
- Entoloma campanulatum (Romagn.) Noordel. & Co-David (2009)
- Entoloma canadense Noordel., G.M. Jansen & Dima (2020)
- Entoloma cancrinellum (M. Lange) Noordel. (1984)
- Entoloma candens Hesler (1967)
- Entoloma candicans (Romagn. & Gilles) Noordel. & Co-David (2009)
- Entoloma candidogranulosum Noordel. & Hauskn. (2007)
- Entoloma candidulum Hesler (1967)
- Entoloma canescens Hesler (1967)
- Entoloma canobrunnescens E. Horak (1980)
- Entoloma canoconicum E. Horak (1976)
- Entoloma canosericeum (J.E. Lange) Noordel. (1982)
- Entoloma cantharelluloides (Singer) E. Horak (1978)
- Entoloma capeladense Blanco-Dios (2010)
- Entoloma capitatocystidium Tkalčec & Mešić (2016)
- Entoloma capitatum (Romagn. & Gilles) Noordel. & Co-David (2009)
- Entoloma capnoides (Romagn. & Gilles) Noordel. & Co-David (2009)
- Entoloma captiosum E. Horak (2008)
- Entoloma carbonicola Noordel. (1982)
- Entoloma caribaeum (Pegler) Courtec. & Fiard (2004)
- Entoloma carminicolor G.M. Gates & Noordel. (2007)
- Entoloma carneobrunneum W.M. Zhang (1994)
- Entoloma carneogriseum (Berk. & Broome) Noordel. (1987)
- Entoloma carneum Z.S. Bi (1986))
- Entoloma carolinianum Hesler (1967)
- Entoloma catalaense Noordel. & Contu (2004)
- Entoloma catalaunicum (Singer) Noordel. (1982)
- Entoloma caulocystidiatum Noordel. & Dima (2022)
- Entoloma cavipes E. Horak (1973)
- Entoloma cedeirense Blanco-Dios (2021)
- Entoloma cedretorum (Romagn. & Riousset) Noordel. (1982)
- Entoloma celatum (Mazzer) Noordel. & Co-David (2009)
- Entoloma cephalotrichum (P.D. Orton) Noordel. (1979)
- Entoloma ceratopus E. Horak (1980)
- Entoloma cerifactum E. Horak (2008)
- Entoloma cerinum E. Horak (1978)
- Entoloma cerussatum Pegler (1983)
- Entoloma cervinum (Karstedt & Capelari) Blanco-Dios (2015)
- Entoloma cetratum (Fr.) M.M. Moser (1978)
- Entoloma cettoi Noordel., Hauskn. & Zuccher. (1994)
- Entoloma chalybescens Wölfel, Noordel. & Dähncke (2001)
- Entoloma chalybeum (Pers.) Noordel. (1982)
- Entoloma chalybs E. Horak (1980)
- Entoloma chamaecyparidis (Hongo) Hongo (2010)
- Entoloma chamaemori Noordel., Weholt, Eidissen & Lorås (2017)
- Entoloma changchunense Xiao L. He & T.H. Li (2012)
- Entoloma chelone Noordel. & E. Horak (1987)
- Entoloma chilense (E. Horak) Noordel. & Co-David (2009)
- Entoloma chilianum Blanco-Dios (2017)
- Entoloma chionoderma (Pilát) Noordel. (1981)
- Entoloma chloroconum (Romagn. & Gilles) Noordel. & Co-David (2009)
- Entoloma chloroides (Romagn. & Gilles) Noordel. & Co-David (2009)
- Entoloma chlorolivaceum (G.F. Atk.) Blanco-Dios (2015)
- Entoloma chlorophyllum Noordel. (1980)
- Entoloma chloropolium (Fr.) M.M. Moser (1986)
- Entoloma chlorospilum (Romagn. & Gilles) Noordel. & Co-David (2009)
- Entoloma chloroxanthum G. Stev. (1962)
- Entoloma choanomorphum G.M. Gates & Noordel. (2007)
- Entoloma chrysoblemum (G.F. Atk.) Blanco-Dios (2017)
- Entoloma chrysopus G.M. Gates & Noordel. (2007)
- Entoloma chytrophilum Wölfel, Noordel. & Dähncke (2001)
- Entoloma ciliferum (Romagn. & Gilles) Noordel. & Co-David (2009)
- Entoloma cinchonense Murrill (1911)
- Entoloma cinereofolium Hesler (1974)
- Entoloma cinereolamellatum Largent (1994)
- Entoloma cinereo-opacum (Noordel.) Vila, Català & Noordel. (2013)
- Entoloma cinereovirens (Romagn. & Gilles) Noordel. & Co-David (2009)
- Entoloma cinereum Velen. (1921)
- Entoloma cinnamomeum O.V. Morozova, Vila, Finy, D. Ageev & Dima (2021)
- Entoloma cistocruentatum Vila, Noordel. & Dima (2022)
- Entoloma cistophilum Trimbach (1981)
- Entoloma cistoumbonatum Vila (2009)
- Entoloma citerinii Réaudin & Eyssart. (2005)
- Entoloma citreostipitatum G. Stev. (1962)
- Entoloma citrinellum (Rick) Blanco-Dios (2017)
- Entoloma citrinodora Largent (1994)
- Entoloma clandestinum (Fr.) Noordel. (1980)
- Entoloma clavaformipes Largent (1994)
- Entoloma clavatum (Largent & T.W. Henkel) Mešić & Tkalčec (2016)
- Entoloma claviferum Arnolds & R.A.F. Enzlin (2015)
- Entoloma claviforme (Largent & Aime) Blanco-Dios (2015)
- Entoloma clavipes Hesler (1967)
- Entoloma clavipilum (Romagn. & Gilles) Noordel. & Co-David (2009)
- Entoloma clavistipes E. Horak (1980)
- Entoloma clelandianum Blanco-Dios (2015)
- Entoloma clintonianum (Peck) Noordel. (2008)
- Entoloma clitocyboides E. Horak & Singer (1982)
- Entoloma clypeatosimilium Largent (1994)
- Entoloma clypeatum (L.) P. Kumm. (1871)
- Entoloma coactum (Largent) Noordel. & Co-David (2009)
- Entoloma coccineum T.H. Li, J.H. Xing & X.S. He (2021)
- Entoloma cocles (Fr.) Noordel. (1981)
- Entoloma coeleste (Romagn. & Gilles) Noordel. & Co-David (2009)
- Entoloma coelestinum (Fr.) Hesler (1967)
- Entoloma coelopus (Romagn. & Gilles) Noordel. & Co-David (2009)
- Entoloma coeruleoexiguum Noordel. & Hauskn. (2015)
- Entoloma coeruleoflocculosum Noordel. (1985)
- Entoloma coeruleogracile G.M. Gates & Noordel. (2007)
- Entoloma coeruleomagnum G.M. Gates & Noordel. (2007)
- Entoloma coeruleopallescens Noordel. & Hauskn. (2015)
- Entoloma coeruleoviride Corner & E. Horak (1980)
- Entoloma cogitatum E. Horak (1980)
- Entoloma cokeri Murrill (1917)
- Entoloma colchicum Kaygusuz, Reschke, O.V. Morozova, Kaya)
- Entoloma colensoi G. Stev. (1962)
- Entoloma coloradense Blanco-Dios (2016)
- Entoloma columbinum Corner & E. Horak (1980)
- Entoloma commune Murrill (1917)
- Entoloma concavosericeum Corner & E. Horak (1980)
- Entoloma concavum (Largent) Noordel. & Co-David (2009)
- Entoloma concentricum (Largent & T.W. Henkel) Mešić & Tkalčec (2016)
- Entoloma conchatum Xiao L. He & E. Horak (2019)
- Entoloma conferendum (Britzelm.) Noordel. (1980)
- Entoloma confusissimum Reschke & Noordel. (2022)
- Entoloma confusum E. Horak (2008)
- Entoloma congregatum G. Stev. (1962)
- Entoloma conicoalbum Eyssart., Buyck & Ducousso (2012)
- Entoloma conicosericeum Vila, F. Caball. & Eyssart. (2013)
- Entoloma conicoumbonatum Hesler (1967)
- Entoloma conicum (Sacc.) Hesler (1967)
- Entoloma conocybecystis Noordel. & Liiv (1992)
- Entoloma conoideum (Speg.) E. Horak (1978)
- Entoloma consanguineum E. Horak (2008)
- Entoloma conspicuocystidiosum E. Horak & Singer (1982)
- Entoloma conspicuum E. Horak (1976)
- Entoloma contortisporum Noordel. & Hauskn. (2007)
- Entoloma contrastans G.M. Gates & Noordel. (2007)
- Entoloma convexum G. Stev. (1962)
- Entoloma coprinoides (Romagn.) Noordel. & Co-David (2009)
- Entoloma coprophilum Noordel. & Doveri (2004)
- Entoloma coracis Brandrud, Dima, Noordel., G.M. Jansen & Vila (2021)
- Entoloma cordobense (Speg.) Blanco-Dios (2017)
- Entoloma corneri E. Horak (1980)
- Entoloma corneum E. Horak (1973)
- Entoloma cornicolor O.V. Morozova, Reschke & Noordel. (2022)
- Entoloma corrugens Corner & E. Horak (1980)
- Entoloma cortinicinctum (Kauffman) Blanco-Dios (2017)
- Entoloma corunnense Blanco-Dios (2015)
- Entoloma corvinum (Kühner) Noordel. (1982)
- Entoloma courtecuissei Lécuru (2017)
- Entoloma crassicystidiatum T.H. Li & Xiao L. He (2012)
- Entoloma crassipes Petch (1924)
- Entoloma crassum C.K. Pradeep & K.B. Vrinda (2012)
- Entoloma cremeoalbum J.B. Jordal & Noordel. (2010)
- Entoloma cremeoluteum (Largent) Noordel. & Co-David (2009)
- Entoloma cremeopallens Corner & E. Horak (1980)
- Entoloma cremeostriatum Reschke, Manz & Noordel. (2022)
- Entoloma cremicolor (Pegler) Blanco-Dios (2015)
- Entoloma crenulatum (Largent) Noordel. & Co-David (2009)
- Entoloma crepidotoides W.Q. Deng & T.H. Li (2014)
- Entoloma cretaceum G.M. Gates & Noordel. (2007)
- Entoloma crinipelloides (Singer) Singer (1986)
- Entoloma crinitum E. Horak (1973)
- Entoloma cristalliferum (Romagn. & Gilles) Noordel. & Co-David (2009)
- Entoloma cristobalense Corner & E. Horak (1980)
- Entoloma croceum E. Horak (1980)
- Entoloma crocotillum Xiao L. He (2015)
- Entoloma cruentatum (Quél.) Noordel. (1984)
- Entoloma cruentosquamosulum Noordel. & Hauskn. (2015)
- Entoloma cryptochroum (Singer) E. Horak (1978)
- Entoloma cryptocystidiatum Arnolds & Noordel. (1979)
- Entoloma cubense (Murrill) Dennis (1953)
- Entoloma cuboideum Hesler (1967)
- Entoloma cuboidoalbum Noordel. & Hauskn. (2009)
- Entoloma cuboidosporum (Beeli) E. Horak (1976)
- Entoloma cucurbita E. Horak (1973)
- Entoloma cudon (Fr.) P. Karst. (1879)
- Entoloma cuneatum (Bres.) M.M. Moser (1978)
- Entoloma cuniculorum Arnolds & Noordel. (1979)
- Entoloma cupressum (Largent) Noordel. & Co-David (2009)
- Entoloma curtipes (Massee) E. Horak (1980)
- Entoloma curtissimum (Romagn. & Gilles) Noordel. & Co-David (2009)
- Entoloma cuspidatum Sacc. (1887)
- Entoloma cuspidiferum Noordel. (1980)
- Entoloma cutifractum E. Horak & Singer (1982)
- Entoloma cyananthes (Romagn.) Noordel. & Co-David (2009)
- Entoloma cyaneobasale Corriol, Dima & Noordel. (2021)
- Entoloma cyaneolilacinum Noordel., J.B. Jordal, Brandrud & Dima (2021)
- Entoloma cyaneonitum (Largent) Blanco-Dios (2015)
- Entoloma cyaneoviridescens (P.D. Orton) Noordel. (1982)
- Entoloma cyaneum Sacc. (1887)
- Entoloma cyanocalyx (Romagn. & Gilles) Noordel. & Co-David (2009)
- Entoloma cyanoides (Romagn.) Noordel. & Co-David (2009)
- Entoloma cyanomelaenus (Boedijn) Manim., Leelav. & Noordel. (2002)
- Entoloma cyanonigrum (Hongo) Hongo (2010)
- Entoloma cyanostipitum Xiao L. He & W.H. Peng (2017)
- Entoloma cyanulum (Lasch) Noordel. (1984)
- Entoloma cyathiforme Dennis (1953)
- Entoloma cycneum O.V. Morozova & T.H.G. Pham (2023)
- Entoloma cylindrocapitatum (T.J. Baroni & Ovrebo) Noordel. & Co-David (2009)
- Entoloma cystidioliferum (Romagn. & Gilles) Noordel. & Co-David (2009)
- Entoloma cystidiophorum Dennis (1961)
- Entoloma cystidiosum G.M. Gates & Noordel. (2009)
- Entoloma cystomarginatum (Largent) Noordel. & Co-David (2009)
- Entoloma cystopus (Berk.) Blanco-Dios (2017)

== D ==
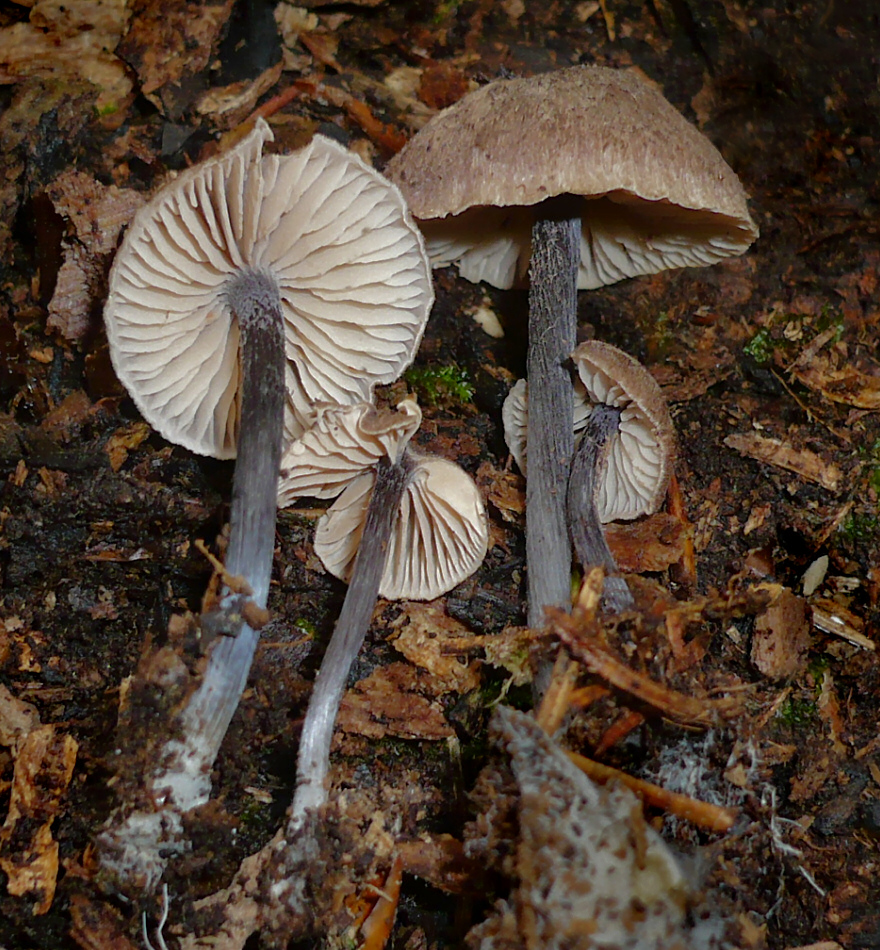
Entoloma dichroum

- Entoloma danbullense Blanco-Dios (2020)
- Entoloma daphnis O.V. Morozova, E.S. Popov, T.H.G. Pham & Noordel. (2022)
- Entoloma davidii Noordel. & Co-David (2009)
- Entoloma davidlargentii Blanco-Dios (2015)
- Entoloma davisianum (Peck) Blanco-Dios (2017)
- Entoloma davisii (Peck) Murrill (1917)
- Entoloma debile (Corner & E. Horak) Noordel. & Co-David (2009)
- Entoloma decaryi Lécuru (2017)
- Entoloma decastes Contu, Consiglio & Noordel. (2009)
- Entoloma deceptivum E. Horak (1973)
- Entoloma decolorans E. Horak (1973)
- Entoloma deconicoides (Romagn. & Gilles) Noordel. & Co-David (2009)
- Entoloma decurrentius (Romagn. & Gilles) Noordel. & Co-David (2009)
- Entoloma defibulatum Arnolds & Noordel. (1979)
- Entoloma deformisporum (Romagn. & Gilles) Noordel. & Co-David (2009)
- Entoloma delicatulum (Sacc.) Blanco-Dios (2017)
- Entoloma delicatum Hesler (1967)
- Entoloma demetriacum (Berk. & Mont.) Sacc. (1887)
- Entoloma deminutivum Peck (1907)
- Entoloma dennisii E. Horak (1976)
- Entoloma densisquamosum E. Horak (1980)
- Entoloma denticulatum (Romagn. & Gilles) Noordel. & Co-David (2009)
- Entoloma depluens (Batsch) Hesler (1967)
- Entoloma deprensum E. Horak (2008)
- Entoloma depressum Noordel. & Vesterh. (2004)
- Entoloma dichroides O.V. Morozova & T.H.G. Pham (2023)
- Entoloma dichrooides (Romagn. & Gilles) Noordel. & Co-David (2009)
- Entoloma dichroum (Pers.) P. Kumm. (1871)
- Entoloma dicubospermum (Romagn. & Gilles) Noordel. & Co-David (2009)
- Entoloma difforme Naveau (1923)
- Entoloma dilutum Mešić & Tkalčec (2016)
- Entoloma dimorphocystis (Romagn. & Gilles) Noordel. & Co-David (2009)
- Entoloma dindenense Blanco-Dios (2015)
- Entoloma dinghuense T.H. Li & Chuan H. Li (2009)
- Entoloma dirense A. Izhar & Khalid (2022)
- Entoloma discolor Corner & E. Horak (1980)
- Entoloma discoloratum Largent (2015)
- Entoloma discophorum Corner & E. Horak (1980)
- Entoloma discordiabile E. Horak (1980)
- Entoloma discrepans Noordel. & G.M. Gates (2012)
- Entoloma dislocatum Vila, Dima & Noordel. (2022)
- Entoloma disparile E. Horak (1980)
- Entoloma dispermum (Kühner) Bon & Courtec. (1987)
- Entoloma disputatum E. Horak (1978)
- Entoloma dissimile (Singer) E. Horak (1978)
- Entoloma distinctum E. Horak (2008)
- Entoloma distinguens E. Horak (1980)
- Entoloma diversum (Largent) Noordel. & Co-David (2009)
- Entoloma divum Corner & E. Horak (1980)
- Entoloma djaense Largent & T.W. Henkel (2019)
- Entoloma djengense (Beeli) Blanco-Dios (2017)
- Entoloma dochmiopus (Romagn. & Gilles) Noordel. & Co-David (2009)
- Entoloma dolosum Corner & E. Horak (1980)
- Entoloma domesticum (Murrill) Hesler (1967)
- Entoloma domingense (T.J. Baroni) Noordel. & Co-David (2009)
- Entoloma dragonosporum (Singer) E. Horak (1977)
- Entoloma dryophiloides (Romagn. & Gilles) Noordel. & Co-David (2009)
- Entoloma dubium (Romagn. & Gilles) Noordel. & Co-David (2009)
- Entoloma ducale E. Horak (1980)
- Entoloma dulce E. Horak (1980)
- Entoloma dulciodorans Montañez, Noordel. & Guzm.-Dáv. (2016)
- Entoloma dulcisaporum (Largent) Noordel. & Co-David (2009)
- Entoloma dunense E. Horak (1980)
- Entoloma dunstervillei (Dennis) E. Horak (1978)
- Entoloma duplocoloratum E. Horak (2008)
- Entoloma durum Largent (1994)
- Entoloma dysthales (Peck) Sacc. (1891)
- Entoloma dysthaloides Noordel. (1979)

== E ==
- Entoloma ealaense (Beeli) Noordel. & Co-David (2009)
- Entoloma earlei Murrill (1917)
- Entoloma eburneum (Romagn. & Gilles) Noordel. & Co-David (2009)
- Entoloma edulis (Peck) Noordel. (2008)
- Entoloma effugiens (Romagn. & Gilles) Noordel. & Co-David (2009)
- Entoloma egonii Courtec. (1986)
- Entoloma egregium E. Horak (1980)
- Entoloma ekaterinae O.V. Morozova, Noordel., K. Nara, Dima & Brandrud (2019)
- Entoloma elaboratum E. Horak (1978)
- Entoloma elaeidis (Romagn. & Gilles) Noordel. & Co-David (2009)
- Entoloma elaphines (Berk. & Broome) Blanco-Dios (2020)
- Entoloma elaphinum (Fr.) Quél. (1880)
- Entoloma elegans (Romagn. & Gilles) Noordel. & Co-David (2009)
- Entoloma elegantissimum E. Horak (2008)
- Entoloma elegantius (Romagn. & Gilles) Blanco-Dios (2015)
- Entoloma elevatum Corner & E. Horak (1980)
- Entoloma elodes (Fr.) P. Kumm. (1871)
- Entoloma elongatum (Romagn.) Noordel. & Co-David (2009)
- Entoloma eminens Kokkonen (2015)
- Entoloma enderlei Noordel. (2004)
- Entoloma endotum Noordel. & G.M. Gates (2012)
- Entoloma engadinum (E. Horak) Noordel. (1982)
- Entoloma entolomoides (Pegler) Courtec. & Fiard (2004)
- Entoloma erectoides Xiao L. He & E. Horak (2018)
- Entoloma erhardii Noordel., Dima, Svetash., Læssøe & Kehlet (2019)
- Entoloma erinaceum (E. Horak) Blanco-Dios (2015)
- Entoloma erubescens E. Horak (1980)
- Entoloma estevei (Maire) Blanco-Dios (2015)
- Entoloma euchloroides (Romagn. & Gilles) Noordel. & Co-David (2009)
- Entoloma euchroum (Pers.) Donk (1949)
- Entoloma eudermum (Romagn. & Gilles) Noordel. & Co-David (2009)
- Entoloma eugenei Noordel. & O.V. Morozova (2010)
- Entoloma euteles (Romagn. & Gilles) Noordel. & Co-David (2009)
- Entoloma euthelum (Berk.) Sacc. (1887)
- Entoloma exalbidum (Largent) Noordel. & Co-David (2009)
- Entoloma excavatum J.Q. Yan, L.G. Chen & S.N. Wang (2024)
- Entoloma excentricum Bres. (1881)
- Entoloma exiguum Esteve-Rav. & M. de la Cruz (1998)
- Entoloma exile (Fr.) Hesler (1967)
- Entoloma extraordinarium E. Horak (1980)
- Entoloma extremophilum Vila, F. Caball. & Llimona (2013)

== F ==
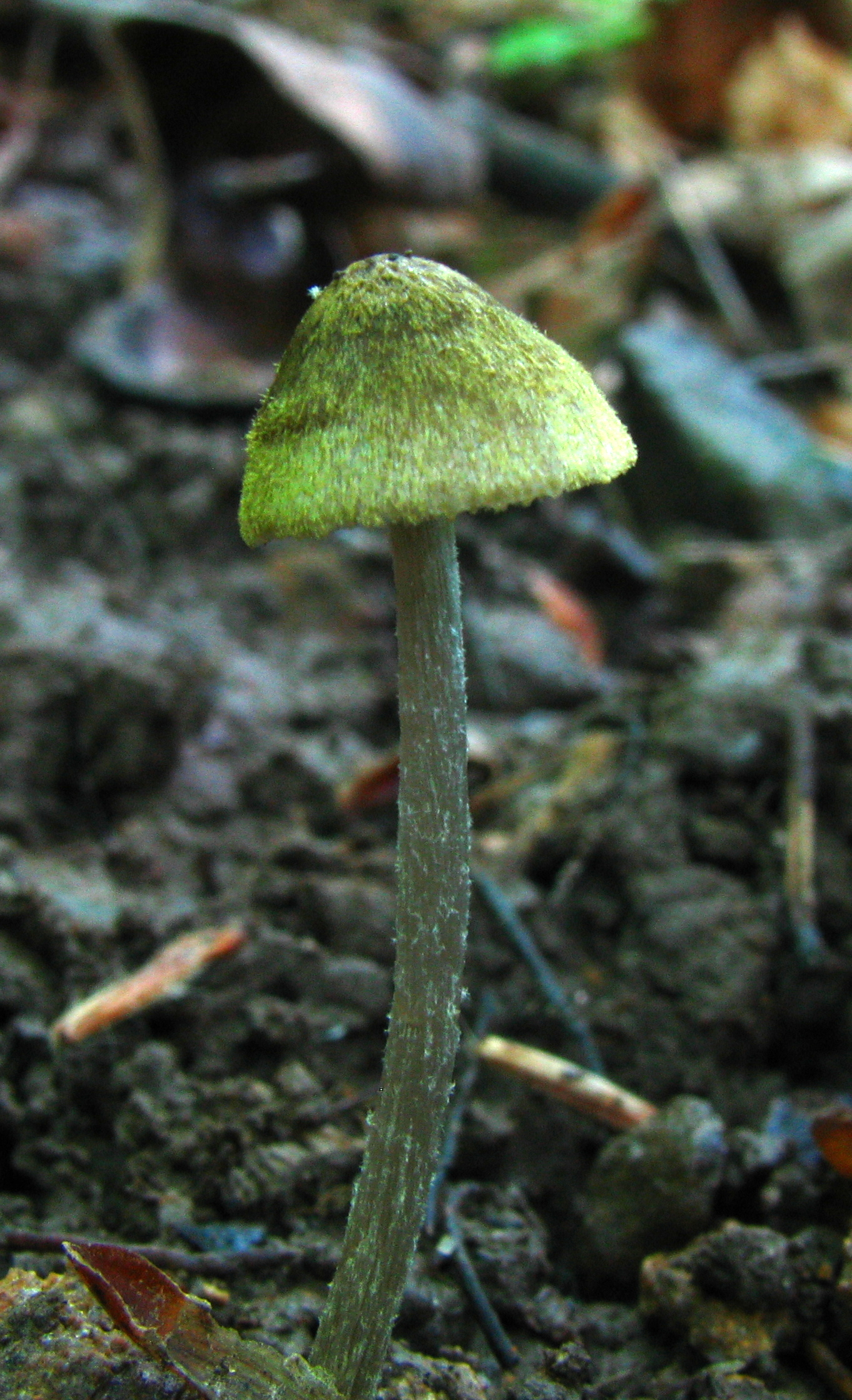
Entoloma flavoviride

- Entoloma fabaceolum (Largent) Noordel. & Co-David (2009)
- Entoloma fabulosum E. Horak (2008)
- Entoloma fagicola E. Ludw. (2007)
- Entoloma farctipes (Speg.) Blanco-Dios (2017)
- Entoloma farinaceum Hesler (1967)
- Entoloma farinasprellum Arnolds (1982)
- Entoloma farinogustus Arnolds & Noordel. (1979)
- Entoloma farinosum (Largent & Skye Moore) Noordel. & G.M. Gates (2012)
- Entoloma farlowii (Singer) Hesler (1967)
- Entoloma farrahii Massee & Crossl. (1904)
- Entoloma fasciculatum Hesler (1967)
- Entoloma fastigiatum (Largent) Noordel. & Co-David (2009)
- Entoloma favrei Noordel. (1982)
- Entoloma fazziense P.-A. Moreau, Vila, Noordel. & Dima (2021)
- Entoloma felleum Murrill (1946)
- Entoloma fernandae (Romagn.) Noordel. (1979)
- Entoloma ferreri (T.J. Baroni, Perd.-Sánch. & S.A. Cantrell) Noordel. & Co-David (2009)
- Entoloma ferruginans Peck (1895)
- Entoloma ferrugineobrunneum W.M. Zhang (1994)
- Entoloma ferrugineogranulatum (Singer) E. Horak (1978)
- Entoloma fertilis (Gray) Gillet (1876)
- Entoloma festivum Noordel., Romm. & Gelderblom (2010)
- Entoloma fiardii Courtec. (2004)
- Entoloma fibrillopilum Largent (1994)
- Entoloma fibrillosipes (Murrill) Noordel. & Co-David (2009)
- Entoloma fibrillosum Murrill (1917)
- Entoloma fibrosopileatum G.M. Gates & Noordel. (2007)
- Entoloma fibulatum (Romagn.) Noordel. & Co-David (2009)
- Entoloma fidele Corner & E. Horak (1980)
- Entoloma fimicola P. Welt & E. Ludw. (2006)
- Entoloma flabellatum Xiao L. He & E. Horak (2019)
- Entoloma flavidorufum Sacc. (1891)
- Entoloma flavidum (Massee) Corner & E. Horak (1980)
- Entoloma flavifolium Peck (1906)
- Entoloma flavisporum (Velen.) Blanco-Dios (2016)
- Entoloma flavobrunneicolor Blanco-Dios (2017)
- Entoloma flavobrunneum (Peck) Noordel. (2008)
- Entoloma flavocerinum E. Horak (1980)
- Entoloma flavoconicum Reschke & Noordel. (2022)
- Entoloma flavofuscum (Romagn.) Pegler (1977)
- Entoloma flavogibbum Corner & E. Horak (1980)
- Entoloma flavoides Courtec. (1986)
- Entoloma flavoquadratum C.K. Pradeep & K.B. Vrinda (2016)
- Entoloma flavostipitatum C.K. Pradeep & K.B. Vrinda (2016)
- Entoloma flavotinctum E. Horak & Corner (1982)
- Entoloma flavovelutinum O.V. Morozova, E.S. Popov, A.V. Alexandrova & Xiao L. He (2015)
- Entoloma flavoviride Peck (1888)
- Entoloma flavum A.E. Johnson (1878)
- Entoloma flexuosipes (Romagn. & Gilles) Noordel. & Co-David (2009)
- Entoloma floccipes P.-A. Moreau & Courtec. (2007)
- Entoloma floccosodentatum Corner & E. Horak (1980)
- Entoloma flocculosum (Bres.) Pacioni (1988)
- Entoloma floridense Morgan-Jones (1971)
- Entoloma fluminanigrum Noordel. & Hauskn. (2015)
- Entoloma fluviale Kokkonen (2021)
- Entoloma foetidum Hesler (1967)
- Entoloma foetulentum Noordel. (1980)
- Entoloma foldatsii (Dennis) E. Horak (1978)
- Entoloma foliocontusum (Largent) Noordel. & Co-David (2009)
- Entoloma foliomarginatum (Peck) Blanco-Dios (2015)
- Entoloma formosoides E. Horak (1980)
- Entoloma formosum (Fr.) Noordel. (1985)
- Entoloma forquignonii (Quél.) Courtec. (2008)
- Entoloma fractum (Velen.) Noordel. (1979)
- Entoloma fracturans E. Horak (1980)
- Entoloma fragile Murrill (1917)
- Entoloma fragilipes Corner & E. Horak (1980)
- Entoloma fragilissimum E. Horak & Desjardin (1993)
- Entoloma fragosum Largent & Aime (2019)
- Entoloma fragrans Hesler (1967)
- Entoloma fraternum (Singer) Blanco-Dios (2015)
- Entoloma fridolfingense Noordel. & Lohmeyer (1995)
- Entoloma frigidum Noordel., E. Larss., Bendiksen, G.M. Jansen & Dima (2020)
- Entoloma fritilliforme Romagn. (1987)
- Entoloma fructifragrans (Largent & Thiers) Noordel. & Co-David (2009)
- Entoloma fuliginarium P. Karst. (1892)
- Entoloma fuligineocinereum Mešić & Tkalčec (2016)
- Entoloma fuligineomarginatum Hesler (1974)
- Entoloma fuligineopallescens G.M. Gates & Noordel. (2007)
- Entoloma fuligineostramineum (Rick) Blanco-Dios (2017)
- Entoloma fuligineoviolaceum G.M. Gates & Noordel. (2009)
- Entoloma fuliginosicolor Blanco-Dios (2017)
- Entoloma fuliginosum Murrill (1917)
- Entoloma fulviceps (Romagn.) Noordel. & Co-David (2009)
- Entoloma fulvolanatum (Berk. & Broome) Blanco-Dios (2017)
- Entoloma fulvoviolaceum Noordel. & Vauras (2004)
- Entoloma fumatopunctum E. Horak (1980)
- Entoloma fumeum Hesler (1967)
- Entoloma fumosellum (G. Winter) Blanco-Dios (2017)
- Entoloma fumosoalbum Murrill (1917)
- Entoloma fumosobrunneum Morgado & Noordel. (2013)
- Entoloma fumosonigrum Peck (1913)
- Entoloma fumosopruinosum G.M. Gates & Noordel. (2007)
- Entoloma fumosum Hesler (1967)
- Entoloma furcatum (Largent & T.W. Henkel) Blanco-Dios (2015)
- Entoloma furfuraceidiscum (Largent) Noordel. & Co-David (2009)
- Entoloma furfuraceum T.H. Li & Xiao L. He (2012)
- Entoloma fuscatum (Largent) Noordel. & Co-David (2009)
- Entoloma fusciceps (Kauffman) Noordel. & Co-David (2009)
- Entoloma fuscifolium (Peck) Blanco-Dios (2015)
- Entoloma fuscobrunneipes Vila & F. Caball. (2009)
- Entoloma fuscogrisellum (Peck) Blanco-Dios (2017)
- Entoloma fuscohebes Vila, J. Carbó & F. Caball. (2013)
- Entoloma fuscomarginatum P.D. Orton (1960)
- Entoloma fusco-ocellatum (Romagn. & Gilles) Noordel. & Co-David (2009)
- Entoloma fusco-ortonii (Largent) Noordel. & Co-David (2009)
- Entoloma fuscorufescens (Speg.) E. Horak (1978)
- Entoloma fuscosquamosum Hesler (1967)
- Entoloma fuscotomentosum F.H. Møller (1945)
- Entoloma fuscum (Cleland) E. Horak (1980)
- Entoloma fusicystis (Romagn. & Gilles) Noordel. & Co-David (2009)
- Entoloma fusiferum (Romagn. & Gilles) Noordel. & Co-David (2009)

== G ==
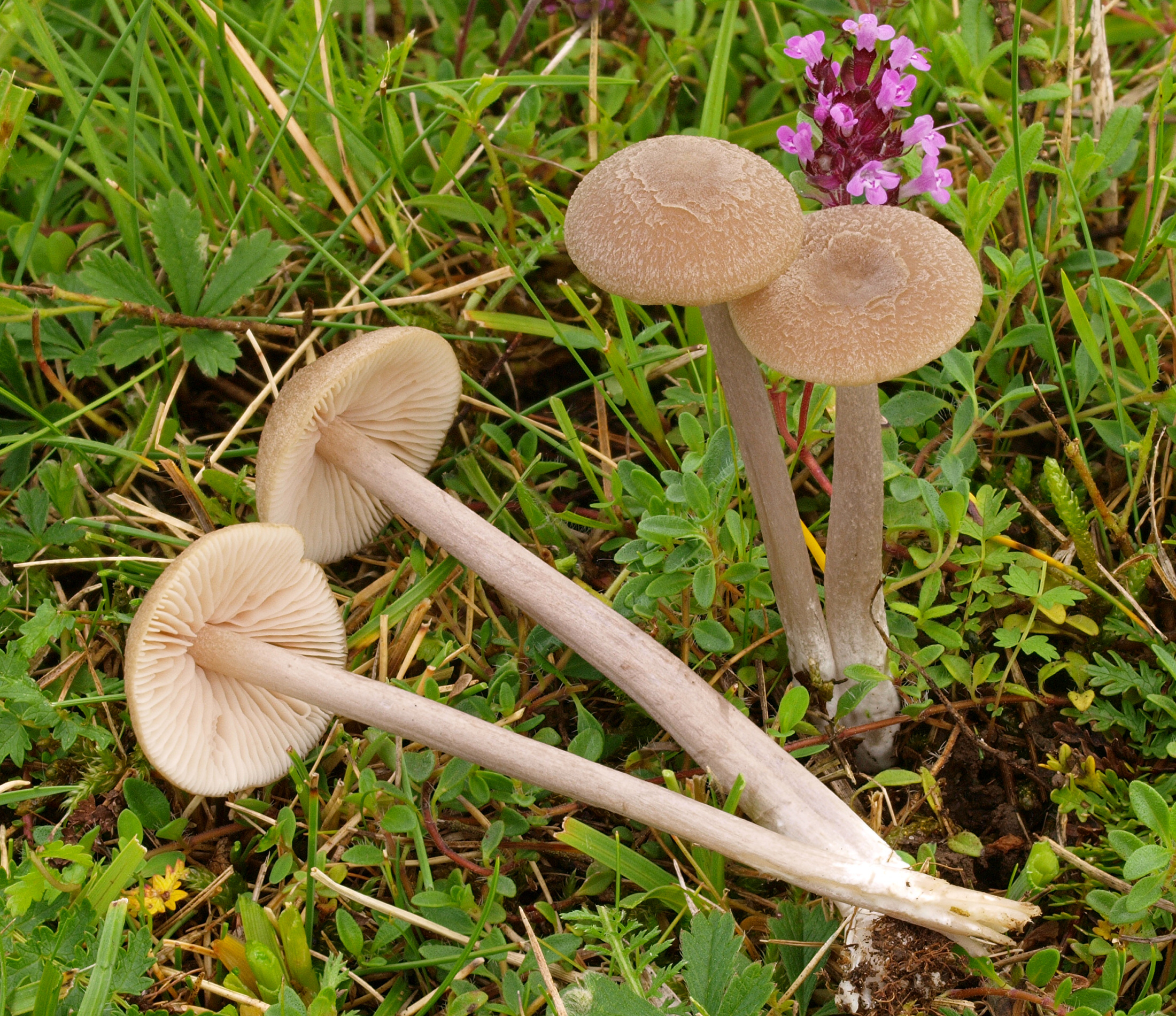
Entoloma griseocyaneum

- Entoloma gabonicum (Romagn. & Gilles) Noordel. & Co-David (2009)
- Entoloma gainsvillae Morgan-Jones (1971)
- Entoloma galbineum (Cooke & Massee) Sacc. (1891)
- Entoloma galericolor Courtec. (1993)
- Entoloma galeroides (Romagn. & Gilles) Noordel. & Co-David (2009)
- Entoloma garibaldii (E. Horak) Blanco-Dios (2015)
- Entoloma gasteromycetoides Co-David & Noordel. (2009)
- Entoloma gelatinosum E. Horak (1973)
- Entoloma geminum (Romagn.) Noordel. & Co-David (2009)
- Entoloma generosum Corner & E. Horak (1980)
- Entoloma gentile E. Horak (1980)
- Entoloma gerriae Noordel. (1981)
- Entoloma gerronematoides (Raithelh.) Raithelh. (1983)
- Entoloma gibbosporum Noordel. & Hauskn. (2007)
- Entoloma giganteum Murrill (1917)
- Entoloma gigaspermum (Romagn. & Gilles) Noordel. & Co-David (2009)
- Entoloma gillesianum Courtec. (1984)
- Entoloma gillesii Courtec. (1984)
- Entoloma gilvum (Romagn. & Gilles) Noordel. & Co-David (2009)
- Entoloma glabrum (Murrill) Blanco-Dios (2017)
- Entoloma glaucobasis Huijsman ex Noordel. (1985)
- Entoloma glaucodubium Corriol (2016)
- Entoloma glaucogilvum (Romagn. & Gilles) Noordel. & Co-David (2009)
- Entoloma glaucopus E. Horak (1980)
- Entoloma glaucoroseum E. Horak (2008)
- Entoloma glenbrookense Blanco-Dios (2017)
- Entoloma globisporum Morgan-Jones (1971)
- Entoloma globuliferum Noordel. (1980)
- Entoloma gloucesterense Blanco-Dios (2015)
- Entoloma glutiniceps (Hongo) Noordel. & Co-David (2009)
- Entoloma glycosmum (Pegler) Courtec. & Fiard (2004)
- Entoloma gnaphalodes (Berk. & Broome) E. Horak (1980)
- Entoloma gnophodes (Berk. & Broome) E. Horak (1980)
- Entoloma goliath (Berk.) Sacc. (1887)
- Entoloma gomerense Wölfel & Noordel. (2001)
- Entoloma goossensiae (Beeli) Blanco-Dios (2017)
- Entoloma gracile G. Stev. (1962)
- Entoloma gracilentum Tkalčec & Mešić (2016)
- Entoloma gracilior Noordel. & G.M. Gates (2012)
- Entoloma gracilipes (Peck) Malloch (2010)
- Entoloma gracilius E. Horak (1976)
- Entoloma grammatum (Romagn. & Gilles) Noordel. & Co-David (2009)
- Entoloma grande Peck (1898)
- Entoloma granulatum (Romagn.) Noordel. & Co-David (2009)
- Entoloma granuliferum E. Horak (1980)
- Entoloma granulosiceps E. Horak (1980)
- Entoloma granulosocystidiatum Noordel. & Hauskn. (2015)e
- Entoloma graphitipes E. Ludw. (2007)
- Entoloma gratissimum E. Horak (1980)
- Entoloma grave E. Horak (1977)
- Entoloma grayanum (Peck) Sacc. (1887)
- Entoloma gregarium Xiao L. He & E. Horak (2019)
- Entoloma greigense (Peck) Blanco-Dios (2020)
- Entoloma griseipes (Romagn. & Gilles) Noordel. & Co-David (2009)
- Entoloma griseoalbum E. Horak (1976)
- Entoloma griseoavellaneum Largent (1994)
- Entoloma griseobrunneum Hesler (1967)
- Entoloma griseocaeruleum Reschke, Manz & Noordel. (2022)
- Entoloma griseocarpum Xiao L. He & E. Horak (2018)
- Entoloma griseocyaneum (Fr.) P. Kumm. (1871)
- Entoloma griseofibrillosum A. Izhar, T. Qasim, Asif, Niazi & Khalid (2023)
- Entoloma griseoincarnatum Hesler (1967)
- Entoloma griseolazulinum Manim. & Noordel. (2006)
- Entoloma griseolimosum C.K. Pradeep & K.B. Vrinda (2013)
- Entoloma griseoluridum (Kühner) M.M. Moser (1978)
- Entoloma griseo-olivascens (Britzelm.) Sacc. & P. Syd. (1899)
- Entoloma griseopruinatum Noordel. & Cheype (2004)
- Entoloma griseorhodopolium Montañez, Noordel. & Guzm.-Dáv. (2016)
- Entoloma griseoroseum (Romagn. & Gilles) Noordel. & Co-David (2009)
- Entoloma griseorubellum (Lasch) Kalamees & Urbonas (1986)
- Entoloma griseorugulosum Noordel. & Fern. Sas. (2004)
- Entoloma griseosquamulosum G.M. Gates & Noordel. (2009)
- Entoloma griseostriatum Mešić & Tkalčec (2016)
- Entoloma griseoviolascens Manim. & Noordel. (2006)
- Entoloma griseovioleum (Romagn. & Gilles) Noordel. & Co-David (2009)
- Entoloma griseoviridulum Courtec. (1993)
- Entoloma griseoxanthopus Courtec. (1993)
- Entoloma griseum Peck (1904)
- Entoloma guatopoanum (Dennis) E. Horak (1978)
- Entoloma guttulatum Largent (2015)
- Entoloma guyanense Blanco-Dios (2015)
- Entoloma guzmanii Courtec. (1986)

== H ==
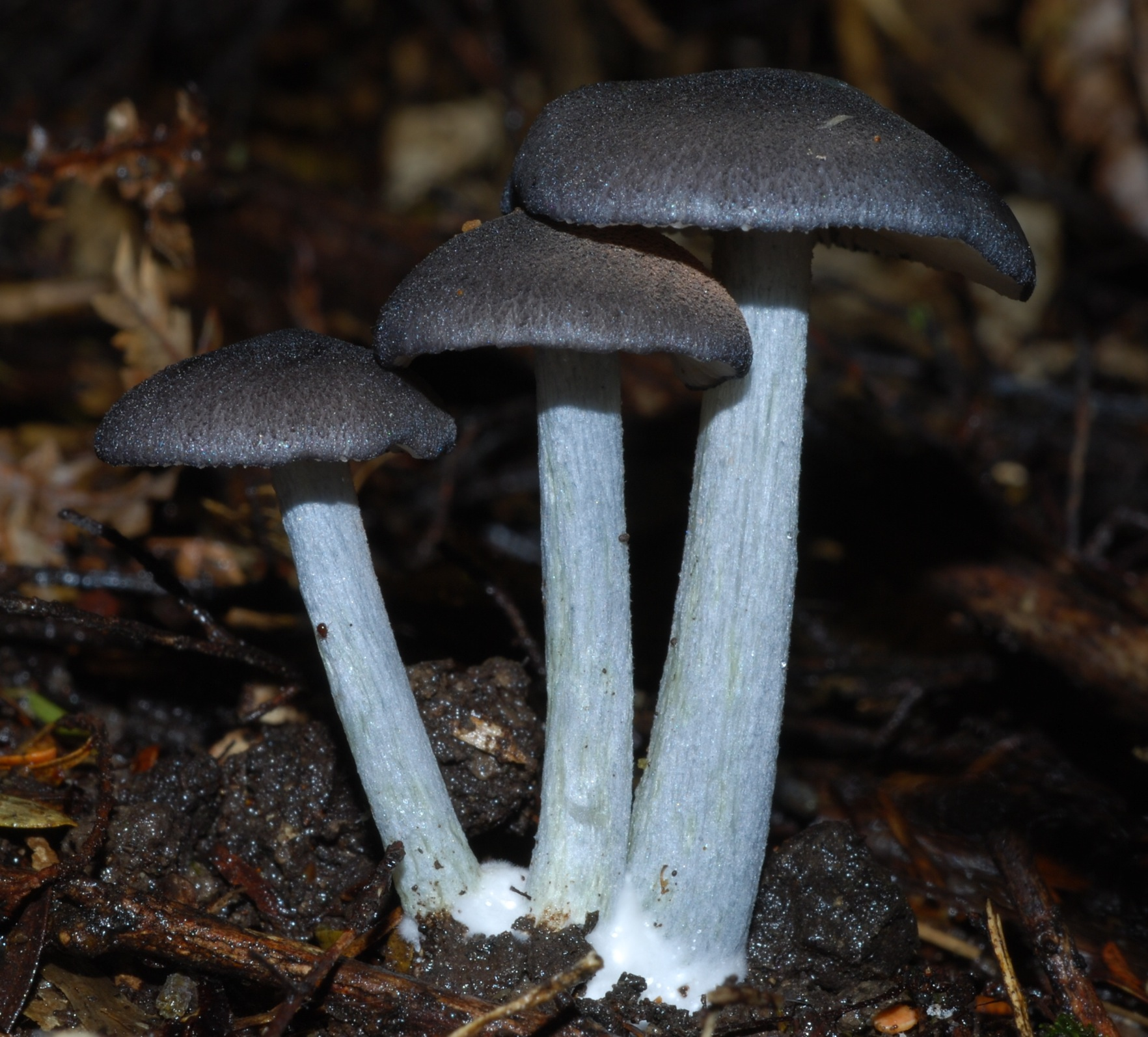
Entoloma haastii

- Entoloma haematinum Manim., Leelav. & Noordel. (2002)
- Entoloma haeuslerianum (Henn.) Blanco-Dios (2017)
- Entoloma hainanense T.H. Li & Xiao L. He (2012)
- Entoloma hallstromii E. Horak (1980)
- Entoloma halophilum F. Caball., J. Carbó, Vila & Català (2014)
- Entoloma hausknechtii Noordel. (2004)
- Entoloma heae Blanco-Dios (2020)
- Entoloma hebes (Romagn.) Trimbach (1981)
- Entoloma heimii (Romagn.) Eyssart., Buyck & Courtec. (2001)
- Entoloma helictum (Berk.) Hesler (1967)
- Entoloma henkelii Blanco-Dios (2015)
- Entoloma henningsii Blanco-Dios (2017)
- Entoloma henrici E. Horak & Aeberh. (1983)
- Entoloma heracleodora Largent (1994)
- Entoloma hesleri Morgan-Jones (1971)
- Entoloma heterocutis Corner & E. Horak (1980)
- Entoloma heterocystis Contu (1995)
- Entoloma highlandense Hesler (1967)
- Entoloma hilare E. Horak (1980)
- Entoloma hilarulum E. Horak (1980)
- Entoloma hircosum Corner & E. Horak (1980)
- Entoloma hirtellum (Romagn.) Noordel. & Co-David (2009)
- Entoloma hirtipes (Schumach.) M.M. Moser (1978)
- Entoloma hirtum (Velen.) Noordel. (1979)
- Entoloma hispidulum (M. Lange) Noordel. (1982)
- Entoloma hispidum (Rick) Blanco-Dios (2017)
- Entoloma hochstetteri (Reichardt) G. Stev. (1962)
- Entoloma holmvassdalenense Eidissen, Lorås & Weholt (2014)
- Entoloma holoconiotum (Largent & Thiers) Noordel. & Co-David (2009)
- Entoloma holocyaneum (Romagn.) Noordel. & Co-David (2009)
- Entoloma hololeucum (Singer) E. Horak (1978)
- Entoloma holophaeum Bres. & Schulzer (1885)
- Entoloma homomorphum (Romagn.) Singer (1986)
- Entoloma hongkongense B. Liu & K. Tao (1991)
- Entoloma horakii Courtec. (1984)
- Entoloma horridum (E. Horak) Noordel. & Co-David (2009)
- Entoloma hortense (Peck) Blanco-Dios (2017)
- Entoloma horticola Corner & E. Horak (1980)
- Entoloma housei (Murrill) Blanco-Dios (2015)
- Entoloma howellii (Peck) Dennis (1953)
- Entoloma hoyafragrans Noordel. & Hauskn. (2007)
- Entoloma huijsmanii Noordel. (1984)
- Entoloma humicola (Romagn. & Gilles) Noordel. & Co-David (2009)
- Entoloma humidiphilum Kaygusuz, Reschke, Kaya, Noordel. & M. Piepenbr. (2024)
- Entoloma hyalodepas (Berk. & Broome) E. Horak (1976)
- Entoloma hygrophilum Tkalčec & Mešić (2016)
- Entoloma hymenidermum Largent (2015)
- Entoloma hypipamee (Largent) Blanco-Dios (2024)
- Entoloma hypochlorum (Romagn. & Gilles) Noordel. & Co-David (2009)
- Entoloma hypogaeum Hir. Sasaki, A. Kinosh. & K. Nara (2012)
- Entoloma hypoglaucum (Romagn.) Noordel. & Co-David (2009)
- Entoloma hypoporphyrum (Berk. & M.A. Curtis) Hesler (1967)

== I ==
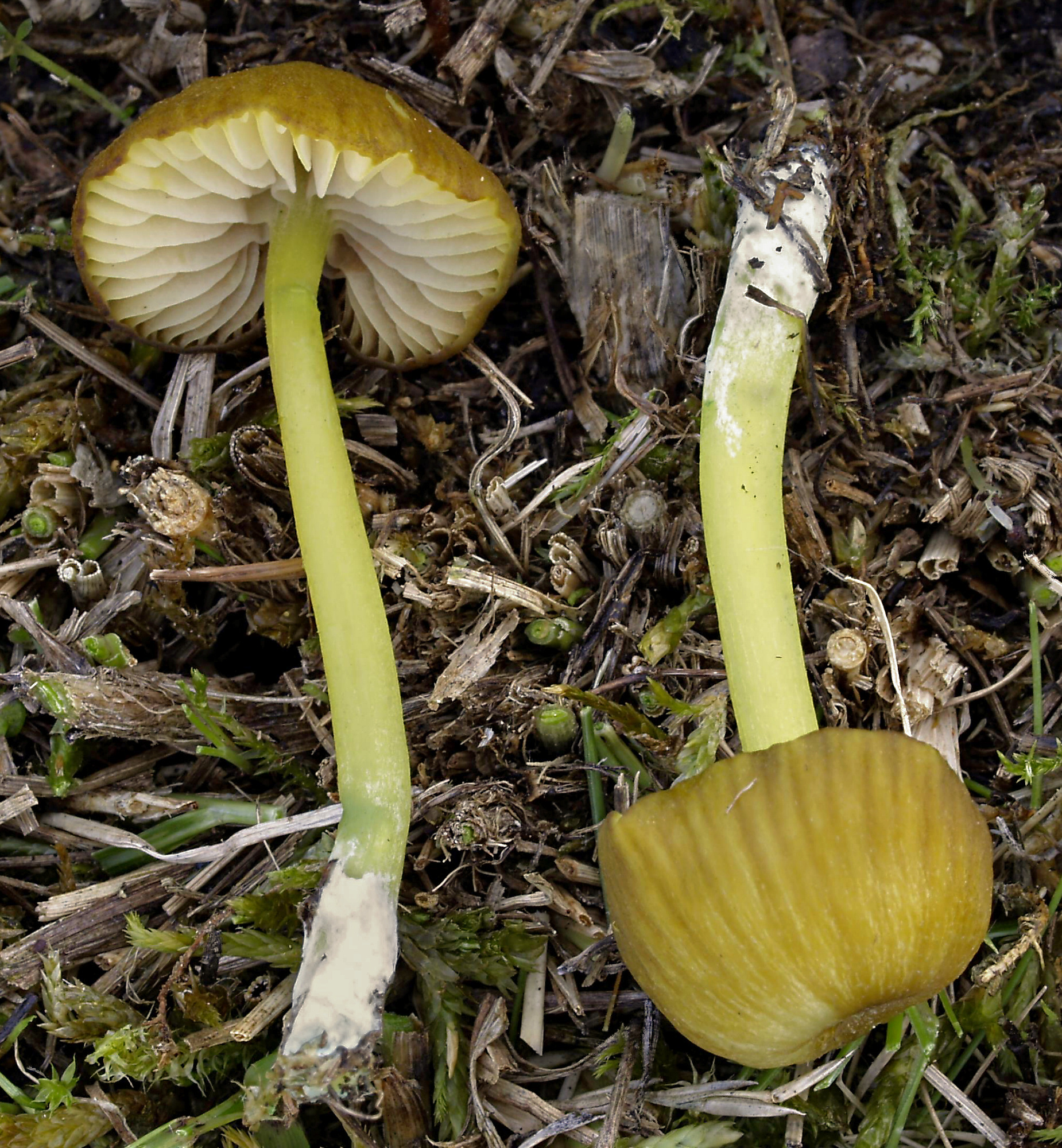
Entoloma incanum

- Entoloma ianthinomeleagris Courtec. (1993)
- Entoloma ianthinum (Romagn. & J. Favre) Noordel. (1982)
- Entoloma ianthomelas (Romagn. & Gilles) Noordel. & Co-David (2009)
- Entoloma icarus O.V. Morozova, E.S. Popov & Noordel. (2022)
- Entoloma illicibile (Britzelm.) Sacc. (1887)
- Entoloma illinitum Largent & Aime (2008)
- Entoloma illotum Corner & E. Horak (1980)
- Entoloma imbecille (E. Horak) E. Horak ex Segedin & Pennycook (2001)
- Entoloma impedidum E. Horak (1978)
- Entoloma improvisum E. Horak (2008)
- Entoloma incanosquamulosum (Largent) Noordel. & Co-David (2009)
- Entoloma incanum (Fr.) Hesler (1967)
- Entoloma incarnatofuscescens (Britzelm.) Noordel. (1985)
- Entoloma incertum (Romagn.) E. Horak (1976)
- Entoloma incognitum Reschke, Noordel., O.V. Morozova & Corriol (2022)
- Entoloma incongruum (Berk.) E. Horak (1980)
- Entoloma inconspicuum G. Stev. (1962)
- Entoloma incrustatum Mešić & Tkalčec (2016)
- Entoloma incurvum (Romagn. & Gilles) Noordel. & Co-David (2009)
- Entoloma indicum Natarajan & C. Ravindran (2003)
- Entoloma indigoferum (Ellis) Sacc. (1887)
- Entoloma indigoticoumbrinum G.M. Gates & Noordel. (2007)
- Entoloma indikon Kehlet, Noordel. & Dima (2022)
- Entoloma indistinctum Noordel. & G.M. Gates (2012)
- Entoloma indocarneum Manim. & Noordel. (2006)
- Entoloma indoviolaceum Manim. & Noordel. (2006)
- Entoloma indutoides (P.D. Orton) Noordel. (1984)
- Entoloma indutum Boud. (1900)
- Entoloma inficetum Corner & E. Horak (1980)
- Entoloma infirmum E. Horak (1978)
- Entoloma infula (Fr.) Noordel. (1980)
- Entoloma infundibulare (Romagn.) Noordel. & Co-David (2009)
- Entoloma infundibuliforme Petch (1917)
- Entoloma infuscatum Hesler (1974)
- Entoloma inocephalum (Romagn.) Dennis (1953)
- Entoloma inocybiforme Murrill (1917)
- Entoloma inocybospermum (Romagn. & Gilles) Noordel. & Co-David (2009)
- Entoloma inodes (Romagn. & Gilles) Noordel. & Co-David (2009)
- Entoloma inodorum (Velen.) Noordel. (1979)
- Entoloma inops E. Horak (2008)
- Entoloma insecurum Corner & E. Horak (1980)
- Entoloma insidiosum Noordel. (1987)
- Entoloma insolitum Noordel. (1987)
- Entoloma insuetum (Largent) Noordel. & Co-David (2009)
- Entoloma intermedium (F.H. Møller) Blanco-Dios (2017)
- Entoloma intermixtum (Berk. & Broome) Sacc. (1887)
- Entoloma intervenosum (Romagn. & Gilles) Noordel. & Co-David (2009)
- Entoloma intricatum Largent, T.W. Henkel & R.A. Koch (2019)
- Entoloma intutum Corner & E. Horak (1980)
- Entoloma inusitatum Noordel., Enderle & H. Lammers (1995)
- Entoloma inutile (Britzelm.) Noordel. (1980)
- Entoloma inventum E. Horak (2008)
- Entoloma invisibile (Romagn. & Gilles) Noordel. & Co-David (2009)
- Entoloma involutum Velen. (1921)
- Entoloma iodiolens Arnolds & Noordel. (2004)
- Entoloma iodnephes (Berk. & Broome) Sacc. (1887)
- Entoloma ionocyanum (Romagn. & Gilles) Noordel. & Co-David (2009)
- Entoloma ipirangense Blanco-Dios (2015)
- Entoloma irinum (Romagn. & Gilles) Noordel. & Co-David (2009)
- Entoloma isabellinum (Murrill) Blanco-Dios (2017)
- Entoloma isborscanum O.V. Morozova, Noordel., Dima, G.M. Jansen & Reschke (2021)

== J ==
- Entoloma jahnii Wölfel & Winterh. (1993)
- Entoloma jamaicense (Murrill) Hesler (1967)
- Entoloma japonense Blanco-Dios (2015)
- Entoloma japonicum (Hongo) Hongo (2010)
- Entoloma jennyae Noordel. & Cate (1994)
- Entoloma josefvelenovskyi Blanco-Dios (2017)
- Entoloma jubatum (Fr.) P. Karst. (1879)
- Entoloma juncinum (Kühner & Romagn.) Noordel. (1979)
- Entoloma juniperinum Barkman & Noordel. (1986)

== K ==
- Entoloma kallioi Noordel. (1981)
- Entoloma kamerunense (Bres.) E. Horak (1977)
- Entoloma kammala Grgur. (1997)
- Entoloma kansaiense (Hongo) Noordel. & Co-David (2009)
- Entoloma karnatakense Blanco-Dios (2015)
- Entoloma karstedtiae Blanco-Dios (2020)
- Entoloma kauffmanii Malloch (2010)
- Entoloma kedrovense Noordel. & O.V. Morozova (2010)
- Entoloma keralense Manim. & Noordel. (2006)
- Entoloma kermandii G.M. Gates & Noordel. (2007)
- Entoloma kerocarpus Hauskn. & Noordel. (1999)
- Entoloma kervernii (De Guern.) M.M. Moser (1978)
- Entoloma kewarra Largent (2015)
- Entoloma khalidii Asif, Saba & Raza (2024)
- Entoloma khushabense Z. Khan, Izhar & Khalid (2024)
- Entoloma kipukae E. Horak & Desjardin (1993)
- Entoloma kitsii Noordel. (1983)
- Entoloma klofacianum Noordel., Wölfel & Hauskn. (1995)
- Entoloma kobayasianum E. Horak (1986)
- Entoloma korhonenii Noordel. (2004)
- Entoloma kovalenkoi O.V. Morozova, E.S. Popov & A.V. Alexandrova (2021)
- Entoloma kristiansenii Noordel. (1987)
- Entoloma kruticianum O.V. Morozova, M.Y. Dyakov, E.S. Popov & A.V. Alexandrova (2016)
- Entoloma kuehnerianum Noordel. (1985)
- Entoloma kujuense (Hongo) Hongo (2010)
- Entoloma kummerianum (Henn.) Blanco-Dios (2017)
- Entoloma kumraticum A. Izhar, Kiran, Usman & Khalid (2022)

== L ==
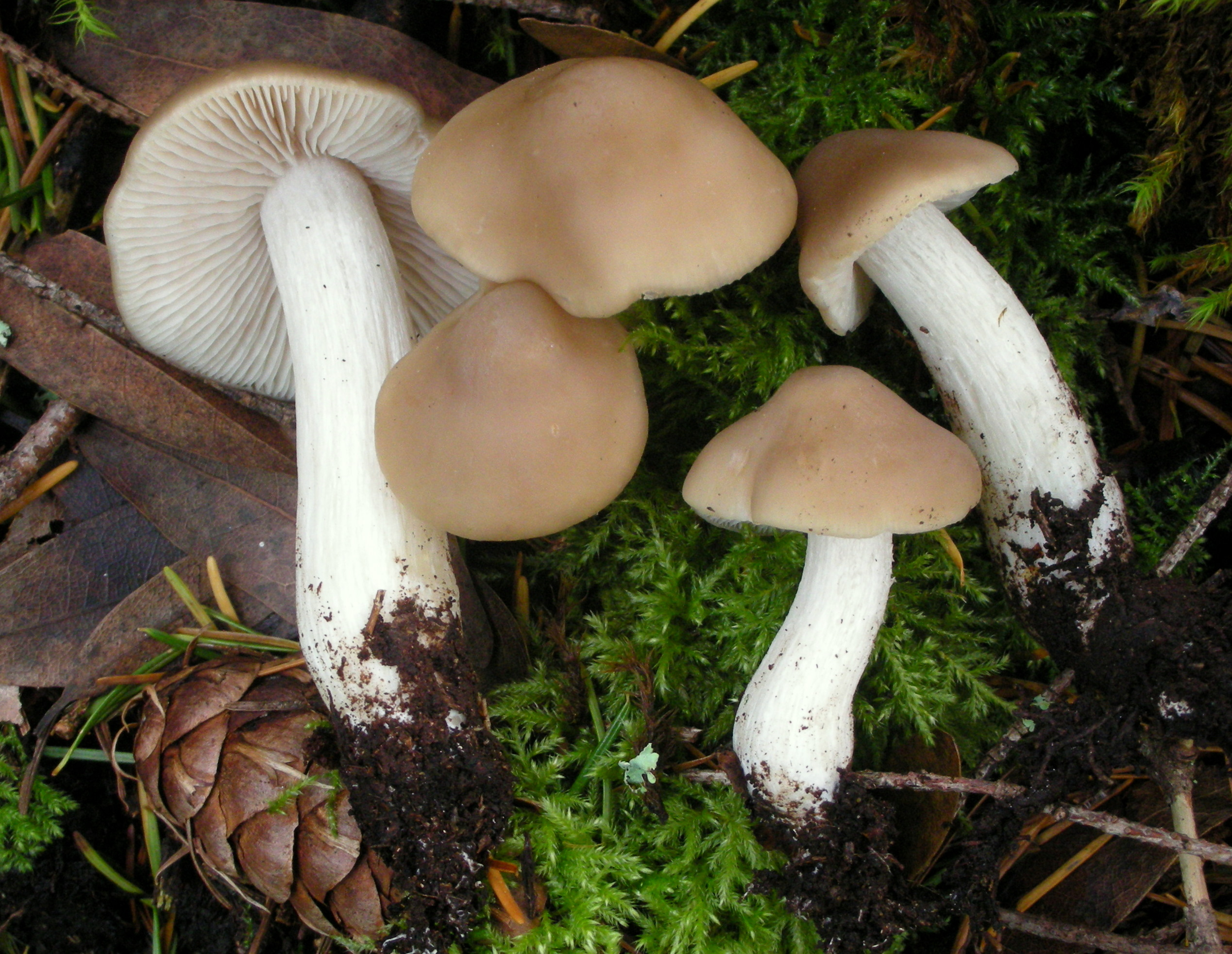
Entoloma lividoalbum

- Entoloma laccarioides T.H. Li, E. Horak & Xiao L. He (2015)
- Entoloma laceratum Largent (1994)
- Entoloma lactarioides Noordel. & Liiv (1992)
- Entoloma lacteonigrum (Singer) E. Horak (1978)
- Entoloma lacticolor J.Q. Yan, L.G. Chen & S.N. Wang (2024)
- Entoloma lacus Kondo (2017)
- Entoloma laeticolor Sacc. (1891)
- Entoloma lagenicystis Hesler (1967)
- Entoloma lageniforme (Largent & Skye Moore) Blanco-Dios (2015)
- Entoloma lamellirugum (Romagn. & Gilles) Noordel. & Co-David (2009)
- Entoloma lampropus (Fr.) Hesler (1967)
- Entoloma lanceolatum Wölfel & Hauskn. (1999)
- Entoloma langei Noordel. & T. Borgen (1984)
- Entoloma lanicum (Romagn.) Noordel. (1981)
- Entoloma lanuginosipes Noordel. (1979)
- Entoloma largentianum Karstedt & Capelari (2015)
- Entoloma largentii Courtec. (1986)
- Entoloma lasium (Berk. & Broome) Noordel. & Co-David (2009)
- Entoloma latericolor E. Horak (1976)
- Entoloma lateripes (Romagn. & Gilles) Noordel. & Co-David (2009)
- Entoloma lateritium (Romagn. & Gilles) Noordel. & Co-David (2009)
- Entoloma latifolium Hesler (1967)
- Entoloma latisporum (Romagn. & Gilles) Noordel. & Co-David (2009)
- Entoloma laurisilvae Hauskn. & Noordel. (2006)
- Entoloma lazoi E. Horak (1978)
- Entoloma lazulinoardesiacum (Dennis) Blanco-Dios (2015)
- Entoloma lecythiforme (D.L. Largent) Blanco-Dios (2022)
- Entoloma lecythiocystis (Romagn. & Gilles) Noordel. & Co-David (2009)
- Entoloma lecythiophorum (Romagn. & Gilles) Noordel. & Co-David (2009)
- Entoloma legionense Blanco-Dios (2012)
- Entoloma leochromus Noordel. & Liiv (1992)
- Entoloma lepidissimum (Svrček) Noordel. (1982)
- Entoloma lepiotoides G.M. Gates & Noordel. (2007)
- Entoloma lepiotosmum (Romagn.) Noordel. (1982)
- Entoloma leptohyphes (Romagn.) Noordel. & Co-David (2009)
- Entoloma leptoniisporum (Richon) J.M. Vidal & P.-A. Moreau (2016)
- Entoloma leucaspis E. Horak (1980)
- Entoloma leucocarpum Noordel. (1981)
- Entoloma leucocephalum (Romagn. & Gilles) Noordel. & Co-David (2009)
- Entoloma leucodermum Eyssart., Buyck & Ducousso (2012)
- Entoloma leuconitens Noordel. & Polemis (2008)
- Entoloma leucopus (Romagn. & Gilles) Noordel. & Co-David (2009)
- Entoloma leviculum Corner & E. Horak (1980)
- Entoloma liaoningense Y. Li, L.L. Qi & Xiao L. He (2012)
- Entoloma liberale E. Horak (1980)
- Entoloma lidbergii Noordel. (1994)
- Entoloma lignoputridum Corner & E. Horak (1980)
- Entoloma lilacinogriseum (Raithelh.) Raithelh. (1987)
- Entoloma lilacinoroseum Bon & Guinb. (1984)
- Entoloma lilacipes E. Horak (1978)
- Entoloma lillirium Noordel. & G.M. Gates (2012)
- Entoloma limatum E. Horak (1980)
- Entoloma limosellum (P.D. Orton) Blanco-Dios (2017)
- Entoloma lineum Corner & E. Horak (1980)
- Entoloma liniformans Noordel. & Hauskn. (2015)
- Entoloma linkii (Fr.) Noordel. (1982)
- Entoloma liquescens (Cooke) Sacc. (1887)
- Entoloma lisalense (Beeli) Noordel. & Co-David (2009)
- Entoloma lividoalbum (Kühner & Romagn.) Kubička (1975)
- Entoloma lividocyanulum (Kühner) Noordel. (1984)
- Entoloma lividomurinum Hesler (1967)
- Entoloma llimonae Vila, F. Caball., Català & J. Carbó (2013)
- Entoloma lodgeae Blanco-Dios (2015)
- Entoloma lomapadum Manim., A.V. Joseph & Leelav. (1995)
- Entoloma lomavrithum K.N.A. Raj & Manim. (2012)
- Entoloma longissimum (Romagn. & Gilles) Noordel. & Co-David (2009)
- Entoloma longistriatum (Peck) Noordel. (1988)
- Entoloma lowyi (Singer) E. Horak (1978)
- Entoloma lucense Blanco-Dios (2013)
- Entoloma lucidum (P.D. Orton) M.M. Moser (1978)
- Entoloma lunare J.B. Jordal, Dima, G.M. Jansen & Noordel. (2022)
- Entoloma lupinum Kokkonen (2015)
- Entoloma luridum Hesler (1967)
- Entoloma lushanense J. Wang, J.Q. Yan & G.H. Huo (2020)
- Entoloma lutense (Romagn. & Gilles) Noordel. & Co-David (2009)
- Entoloma luteobasis Ebert & E. Ludw. (1992)
- Entoloma luteodiscum K.N.A. Raj & Manim. (2016)
- Entoloma luteofuscum K.N.A. Raj & Manim. (2014)
- Entoloma luteolamellatum (Largent & Aime) Blanco-Dios (2015)
- Entoloma luteoochraceum Ribes & Vila (2013)
- Entoloma luteoroseum Hesler (1967)
- Entoloma luteosplendidum E. Horak & Cheype (2009)
- Entoloma luteoviolaceum Ribes & Vila (2013)
- Entoloma luteum Peck (1902)
- Entoloma lutulentum (Largent) Noordel. & Co-David (2009)
- Entoloma lycopersicum E. Horak & Singer (1982)
- Entoloma lyophylliforme (Singer) E. Horak (1978)
- Entoloma lyophylloidium Largent (1994)

== M ==
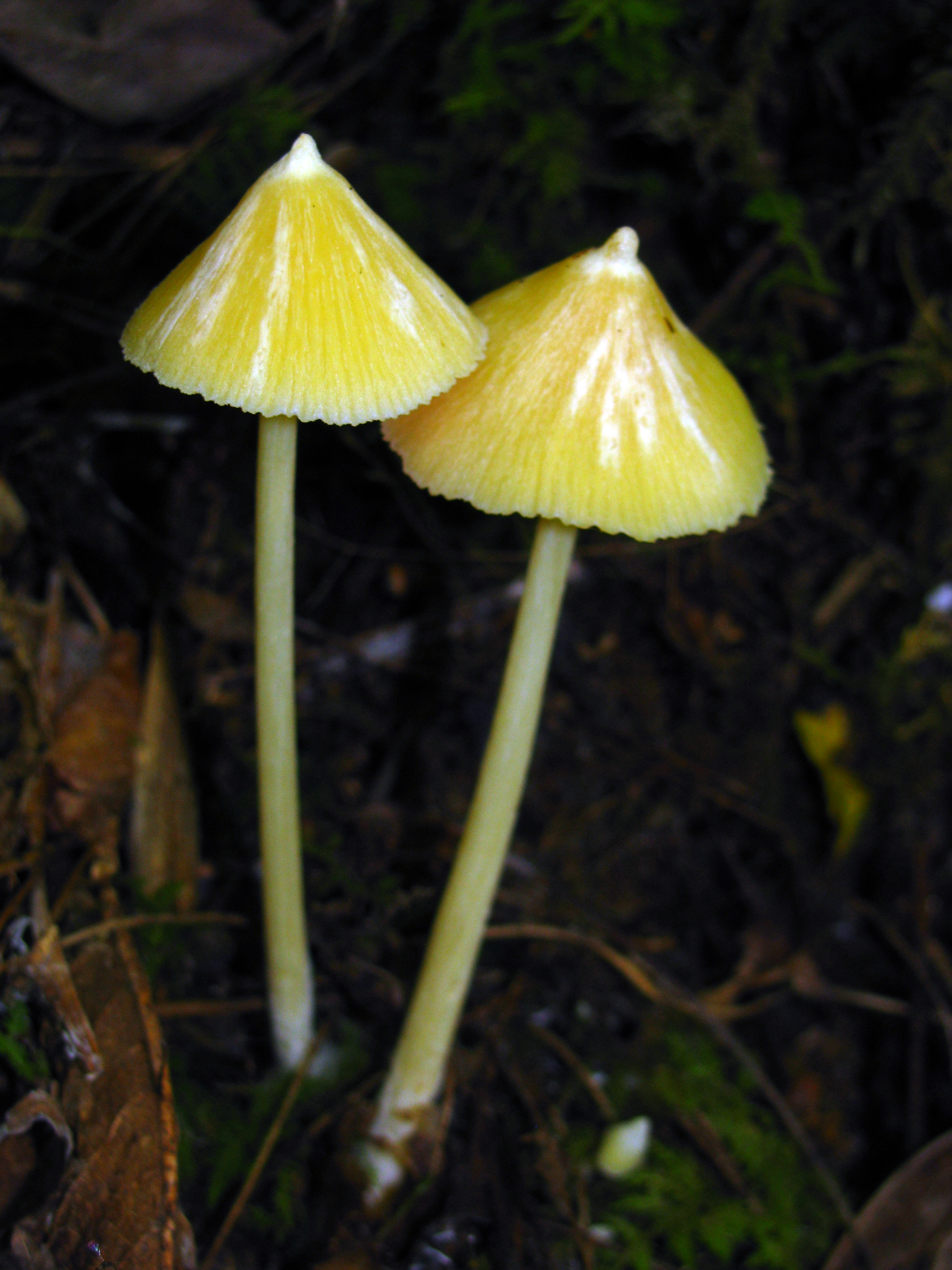
Entoloma murrayi

- Entoloma macchabeense Noordel. & Hauskn. (2015)
- Entoloma machielii de Meijer (2009)
- Entoloma macrosporum (J.W. Cribb) Noordel. & Co-David (2009)
- Entoloma maculatum Hesler (1967)
- Entoloma maculosum (Pegler) Courtec. & Fiard (2004)
- Entoloma maderaspatanum (Pegler) E. Horak (1980)
- Entoloma madidum Gillet (1876)
- Entoloma magnaltitudinis Noordel. & Senn-Irlet (1987)
- Entoloma magnificum (Pegler) Courtec. & Fiard (2004)
- Entoloma magnum K.N.A. Raj & Manim. (2017)
- Entoloma maheense Noordel. & Hauskn. (2007)
- Entoloma majale (Fr.) P. Karst. (1879)
- Entoloma majaloides P.D. Orton (1960)
- Entoloma maldea G.M. Gates & Noordel. (2007)
- Entoloma malenconianum Blanco-Dios (2015)
- Entoloma malenconii Vila & Llimona (2002)
- Entoloma maleolens E. Horak (1980)
- Entoloma mammaesimile E. Horak (1980)
- Entoloma mammiferum (Romagn.) Noordel. & Co-David (2009)
- Entoloma mammillatum (Murrill) Hesler (1967)
- Entoloma mammosum (L.) Hesler (1967)
- Entoloma mancum E. Horak (2008)
- Entoloma manganaense G.M. Gates & Noordel. (2007)
- Entoloma margaritiferum (Romagn. & Gilles) Noordel. & Co-David (2009)
- Entoloma marginatum Hesler (1967)
- Entoloma mariae G. Stev. (1962)
- Entoloma marinum Corner & E. Horak (1980)
- Entoloma maroccanum Blanco-Dios (2015)
- Entoloma martinicum (Pegler) Courtec. & Fiard (2004)
- Entoloma mascarense Noordel. & Hauskn. (2007)
- Entoloma masseei Courtec. (1984)
- Entoloma mastoideum T.H. Li & Xiao L. He (2011)
- Entoloma mathinnae G.M. Gates, B.M. Horton & Noordel. (2009)
- Entoloma mauricum P.-A. Moreau, Corriol, Borgarino & Lavoise (2007)
- Entoloma mauritianum Noordel. & Hauskn. (2007)
- Entoloma mazophorum (Berk. & Broome) Sacc. (1887)
- Entoloma mazzeri Courtec. (1984)
- Entoloma mcnabbianum E. Horak (1980)
- Entoloma medianox C.F. Schwarz (2015)
- Entoloma mediocre (Britzelm.) Sacc. (1895)
- Entoloma mediofuscum (Romagn. & Gilles) Noordel. & Co-David (2009)
- Entoloma mediorobustum Reschke, Rodr.-Cedeño & Noordel. (2022)
- Entoloma mediterraneense Noordel. & Hauskn. (2002)
- Entoloma megacystidiosum Hesler (1967)
- Entoloma megacystis E. Horak (1980)
- Entoloma megalothrix (Romagn. & Gilles) Noordel. & Co-David (2009)
- Entoloma melaniceps (Cooke & Massee) Sacc. (1891)
- Entoloma melanocephalum G. Stev. (1962)
- Entoloma melanochroum Noordel. (1987)
- Entoloma melanophthalmum G.M. Gates & Noordel. (2009)
- Entoloma melanoxanthum E. Horak (1986)
- Entoloma melenosmum Noordel. (1984)
- Entoloma melleicolor Murrill (1917)
- Entoloma melleidiscum Murrill (1917)
- Entoloma melleipes (Murrill) Hesler (1967)
- Entoloma melleogriseum (T.J. Baroni & Y. Lamoureux) Blanco-Dios (2015)
- Entoloma melleosquamulosum Reschke, Manz & Noordel. (2022)
- Entoloma melleum E. Horak (1973)
- Entoloma melongenicolor Noordel. & Hauskn. (2015)
- Entoloma membranaceum (Pegler) Noordel. & Co-David (2009)
- Entoloma mengsongense A.N. Edir., Karun., J.C. Xu, K.D. Hyde & Mortimer (2017)
- Entoloma mephiticum (Murrill) Hesler (1967)
- Entoloma meridionale Mešić, Vila, Polemis, Noordel. & Dima (2021)
- Entoloma mesites (Singer) Blanco-Dios (2015)
- Entoloma mesospermum E. Horak (1976)
- Entoloma metale (Romagn.) Dennis (1953)
- Entoloma metuloideum W.M. Zhang & T.H. Li (2002)
- Entoloma mexicanum (Murrill) Hesler (1967)
- Entoloma microcystis (Romagn. & Gilles) Noordel. & Co-David (2009)
- Entoloma micropus (Sacc.) Hesler (1967)
- Entoloma microserrulatum Reschke & Noordel. (2022)
- Entoloma milleri Noordel. (2004)
- Entoloma milthalerae M. Kamke & Lüderitz (2016)
- Entoloma mimiae (Largent & Aime) Blanco-Dios (2015)
- Entoloma mimicum P. Karst. (1893)
- Entoloma miniatum (Pat.) Hesler (1967)
- Entoloma minimum (Velen.) Noordel. (1979)
- Entoloma minus Peck (1907)
- Entoloma minusculum E. Horak (1980)
- Entoloma minutigranulosum O.V. Morozova, Noordel., Brandrud & Dima (2021)
- Entoloma minutisporum (Vila & Llimona) J. Carbó, Vila, Català & F. Caball. (2013)
- Entoloma minutissimum Eyssart. & Buyck (2014)
- Entoloma minutoalbum E. Horak (1976)
- Entoloma minutobrunneum Tkalčec & Mešić (2016)
- Entoloma minutoincanum (Largent & Abell-Davis) Blanco-Dios (2015)
- Entoloma minutopilum (Largent) Noordel. & Co-David (2009)
- Entoloma minutostriatum (Largent) Noordel. & Co-David (2009)
- Entoloma minutum (P. Karst.) Noordel. (1979)
- Entoloma mirabile Peck (1913)
- Entoloma miraculosum (E. Horak) Noordel. & Co-David (2009)
- Entoloma mirum Kokkonen (2015)
- Entoloma moabus Noordel. & G.M. Gates (2012)
- Entoloma modestissimum (Romagn. & Gilles) Noordel. & Co-David (2009)
- Entoloma modestum Peck (1907)
- Entoloma modicum (Romagn. & Gilles) Noordel. & Co-David (2009)
- Entoloma moguntinum Noordel. & Prüfert (2004)
- Entoloma molestum Eyssart. & Buyck (2014)
- Entoloma moliniophilum Walleyn & Noordel. (2002)
- Entoloma mondahense (Romagn. & Gilles) Noordel. & Co-David (2009)
- Entoloma mongolicum Hauskn., Noordel. & Karasch (2006)
- Entoloma moniliophilum Walleyn & Noordel. (2002)
- Entoloma montanum Noordel., J.B. Jordal, Lorås, Eidissen, E. Larss. & Dima (2021)
- Entoloma moongum Grgur. (1997)
- Entoloma moserianum Noordel. (1983)
- Entoloma mougeotii (Fr.) Hesler (1967)
- Entoloma mridulum Manim., A.V. Joseph & Leelav. (1995)
- Entoloma mucrocystis Eyssart. & Buyck (2014)
- Entoloma mucronatum (Karstedt & Capelari) Blanco-Dios (2015)
- Entoloma multicolor E. Ludw. (2007)
- Entoloma multiforme (Peck) Kokkonen (2015)
- Entoloma murinicolor Blanco-Dios (2017)
- Entoloma muriniforme Murrill (1945)
- Entoloma murinipes (Murrill) Hesler (1967)
- Entoloma murinoalbum E. Horak & Singer (1982)
- Entoloma murinum Peck (1907)
- Entoloma murrayi (Berk. & M.A. Curtis) Sacc. & P. Syd. (1899)
- Entoloma murrillii Hesler (1967)
- Entoloma muscoalpinum Vila, F. Caball. & Català (2014)
- Entoloma mutabilipes Noordel. & Liiv (1992)
- Entoloma myceliosum E. Horak (1978)
- Entoloma myceniforme (Murrill) Hesler (1967)
- Entoloma mycenoides (Hongo) Hongo (2010)
- Entoloma myochroum Noordel. & E. Ludw. (2004)
- Entoloma myodermum (Berk. & Broome) Blanco-Dios (2015)
- Entoloma myriadophyllum O.V. Morozova (2012)
- Entoloma myrmecophilum (Romagn.) M.M. Moser (1978)

== N ==
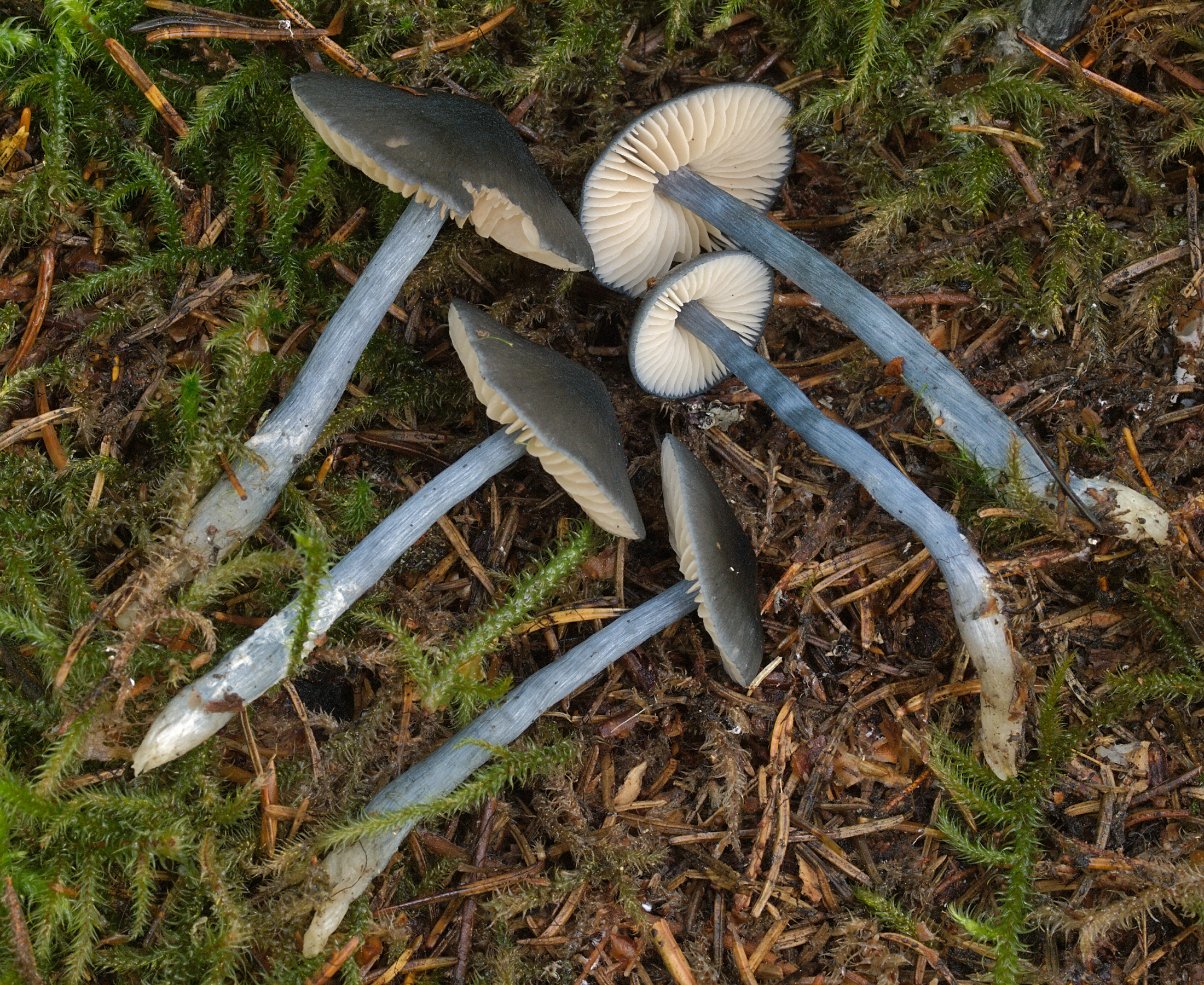
Entoloma nitidum

- Entoloma naniceps E. Horak (1976)
- Entoloma nanosordidum E. Horak & Desjardin (1993)
- Entoloma nanum (Massee) E. Horak (1980)
- Entoloma napaliense (Desjardin & T.J. Baroni) Blanco-Dios (2016)
- Entoloma naranjanum Dennis (1953)
- Entoloma natalis-domini G.M. Gates & Noordel. (2009)
- Entoloma natarajanii Senthil., Kumaresan & S.K. Singh (2011)
- Entoloma nausiosme Noordel. (1987)
- Entoloma necessarium (Britzelm.) Sacc. (1887)
- Entoloma necopinatum E. Horak (1978)
- Entoloma neglectum (Lasch) Arnolds (1982)
- Entoloma neocaledonicum E. Horak (1980)
- Entoloma neoniveum Eyssart., Buyck & Ducousso (2012)
- Entoloma neosericellum E. Horak (2008)
- Entoloma neoturbidum Pegler (1983)
- Entoloma nesophilum Blanco-Dios (2017)
- Entoloma newlingii (Largent & Bergemann) Blanco-Dios (2016)
- Entoloma nidorosiforme (Romagn.) Noordel. & Co-David (2009)
- Entoloma nigellum (Quél.) Noordel. (1981)
- Entoloma nigricans Peck (1902)
- Entoloma nigrobrunneum Hesler (1967)
- Entoloma nigrocinnamomeum (Kalchbr. & Schulzer) Sacc. (1887)
- Entoloma nigrodiscum Hesler (1967)
- Entoloma nigroflavescens Armada, Bellanger, Noordel. & Dima (2022)
- Entoloma nigropapillatum (Romagn.) Putzke & M. Putzke (2000)
- Entoloma nigrosquamosum Hesler (1967)
- Entoloma nigrovelutinum O.V. Morozova & A.V. Alexandrova (2017)
- Entoloma nigrovillosum Corner & E. Horak (1980)
- Entoloma nigroviolaceum (P.D. Orton) Hesler (1967)
- Entoloma nigrum (Murrill) Blanco-Dios (2017)
- Entoloma nilgirisiense Natarajan & C. Ravindran (2003)
- Entoloma niphoides Romagn. ex Noordel. (1985)
- Entoloma nipponicum T. Kasuya, Nabe, Noordel. & Dima (2019)
- Entoloma niranjanum Manim., A.V. Joseph & Leelav. (1995)
- Entoloma nirupamum Manim., A.V. Joseph & Leelav. (1995)
- Entoloma nitens (Velen.) Noordel. (1979)
- Entoloma nitriolens (Kühner) Trimbach (1981)
- Entoloma niveicolor Blanco-Dios (2017)
- Entoloma niveominutum Tkalčec & Mešić (2016)
- Entoloma nivescens Noordel. (1979)
- Entoloma noctis E. Ludw. (2007)
- Entoloma nodosporum (G.F. Atk.) Noordel. (1979)
- Entoloma nogalarense Blanco-Dios (2015)
- Entoloma noordeloosii Hauskn. (1999)
- Entoloma nordlandicum Noordel., Lorås, Eidissen & Dima (2021)
- Entoloma notabile Loizides, Vila, P.-A. Moreau, Noordel. & Dima (2021)
- Entoloma nothofagi G. Stev. (1962)
- Entoloma novum E. Horak (1978)
- Entoloma nubigenum (Singer) Garrido (1985)
- Entoloma nubilosilvae Reschke & Noordel. (2022)
- Entoloma nubilum Manim., Leelav. & Noordel. (2002)
- Entoloma nubooccultatum Reschke & Noordel. (2022)
- Entoloma nucisaporum (Largent) Blanco-Dios (2016)
- Entoloma nudipileum (Romagn. & Gilles) Noordel. & Co-David (2009)
- Entoloma nudum (Romagn. & Gilles) Noordel. & Co-David (2009)

== O ==
- Entoloma obnubile (Romagn. & Gilles) Noordel. & Co-David (2009)
- Entoloma obrusseum E. Horak (1980)
- Entoloma obscuratum (Largent) Noordel. & Co-David (2009)
- Entoloma obscureotenax G.M. Gates & Noordel. (2007)
- Entoloma obscureovirens G.M. Gates & Noordel. (2007)
- Entoloma obscurogracile Noordel. & G.M. Gates (2012)
- Entoloma obscuromarginatum (Romagn. & Gilles) Noordel. & Co-David (2009)
- Entoloma obscurum Dennis (1953)
- Entoloma obtusisporum E. Horak (1982)
- Entoloma occidentale (Murrill) Blanco-Dios (2015)
- Entoloma occultatum M. van der Vegte & G.M. Jansen (2023)
- Entoloma occultipigmentatum Arnolds & Noordel. (1979)
- Entoloma occultum E. Horak (1978)
- Entoloma ocellatum (Romagn. & Gilles) Noordel. & Co-David (2009)
- Entoloma ochraceodiscum Kaygusuz, Reschke, Kleine, M. Carbone, A. Battaglini, Kaya & M. Piepenbr. (2024)
- Entoloma ochraceostriatum Eyssart. & Buyck (2014)
- Entoloma ochraceum Hesler (1967)
- Entoloma ochreoprunuloides Morgado & Noordel. (2013)
- Entoloma ochromicaceum Noordel. & Liiv (1992)
- Entoloma ochrospora Sathe & S.M. Kulk. (1979)
- Entoloma odoratum Noordel. & Hauskn. (2002)
- Entoloma odoriferum Hesler (1967)
- Entoloma olidum Noordel. & T. Borgen (1984)
- Entoloma olivaceobrunneum Hesler (1967)
- Entoloma olivaceocoloratum Largent & T.W. Henkel (2008)
- Entoloma olivaceohebes Noordel. & Hauskn. (2000)
- Entoloma olivaceomarginatum Hesler (1967)
- Entoloma olivaceosquamosum Hesler (1967)
- Entoloma olivaceostipitatum E. Ludw. & A.-S. Karlsson (2005)
- Entoloma olivaceotinctum Noordel. (1985)
- Entoloma olivaceum Velen. (1940)
- Entoloma olivaesimile E. Horak (1982)
- Entoloma olivipes A. Pearson ex Pegler (1996)
- Entoloma ollare E. Ludw. & T. Rödig (2004)
- Entoloma olorinatum E. Horak (1980)
- Entoloma olorinum (Romagn. & J. Favre) Noordel. (1979)
- Entoloma omiense (Hongo) E. Horak (1986)
- Entoloma omphaliiforme (Velen.) Noordel. (1979)
- Entoloma omphalinoides (Largent) Blanco-Dios (2015)
- Entoloma oncocystis (Romagn. & Gilles) Noordel. & Co-David (2009)
- Entoloma opacum Noordel. (1987)
- Entoloma oregonense Blanco-Dios (2017)
- Entoloma orichalceum E. Horak (2008)
- Entoloma ortegae Vila & Ribes (2021)
- Entoloma ortonii Arnolds & Noordel. (1979)
- Entoloma ovatisporum (Largent) Noordel. & Co-David (2009)
- Entoloma overeemii E. Horak (1977)

== P ==
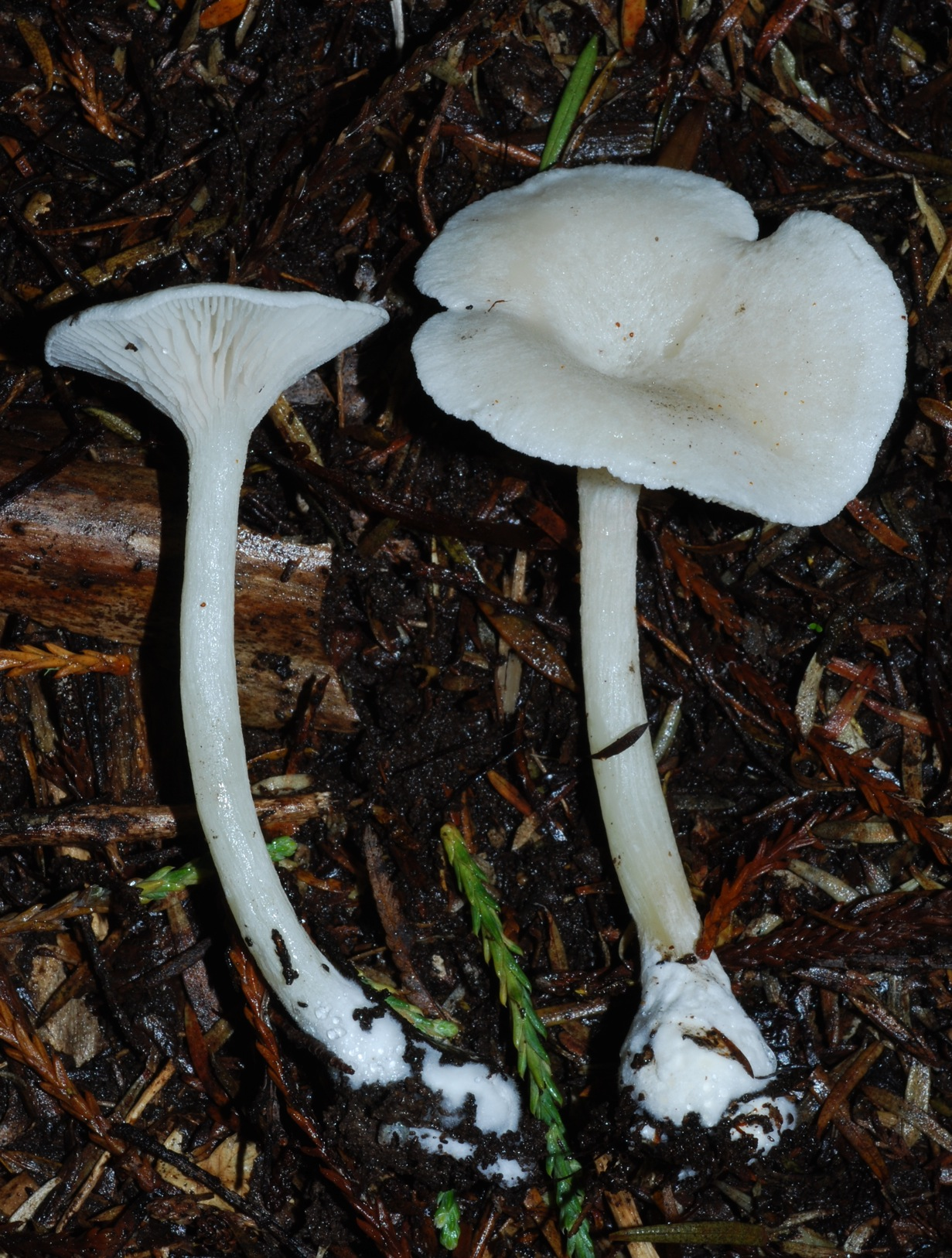
Entoloma peralbidum

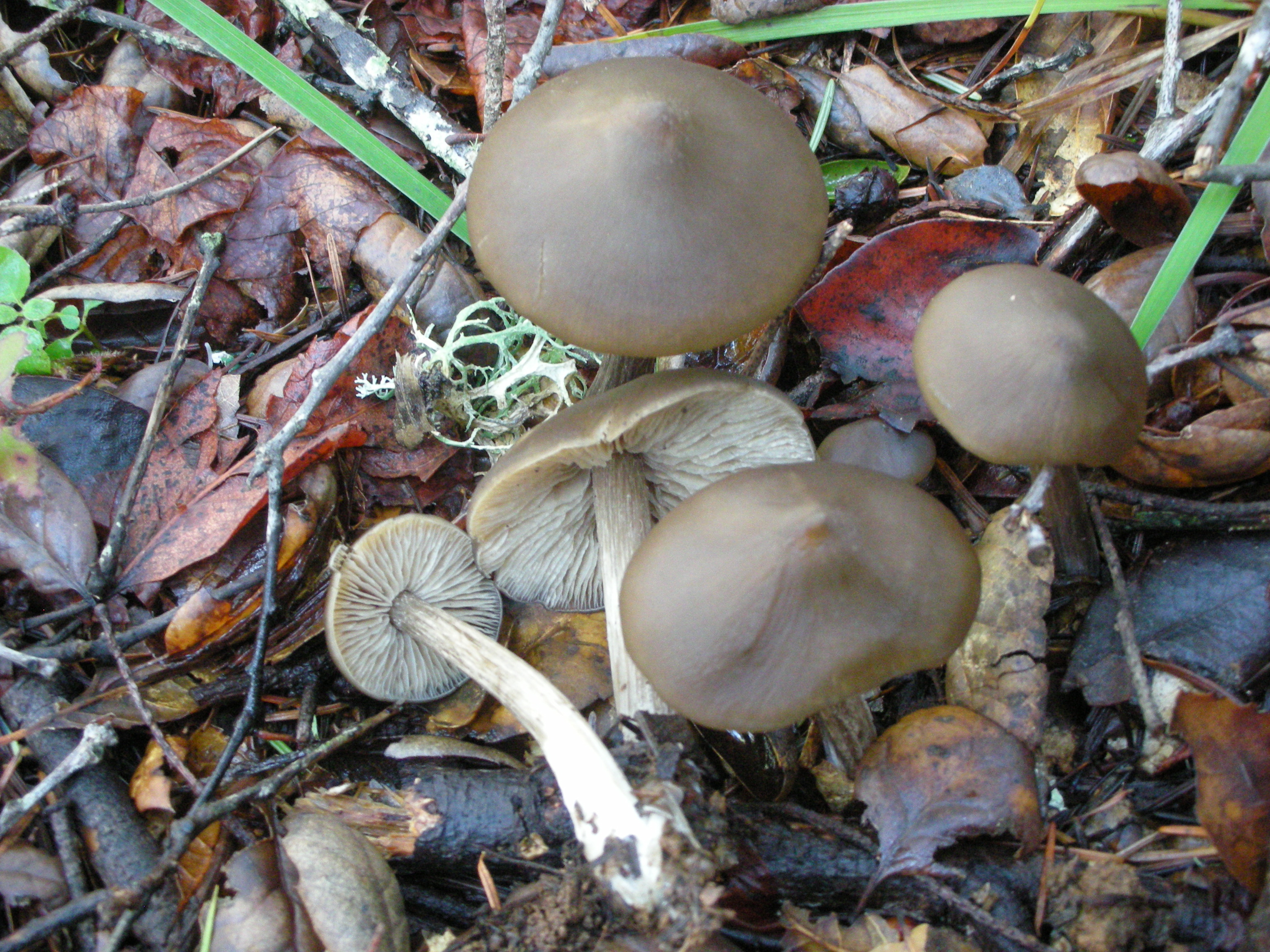
Entoloma pseudostrictium

- Entoloma pachydermum Arnolds & Noordel. (2004)
- Entoloma pachypus (Holmsk.) Cooke ex Sacc. & P. Syd. (1899)
- Entoloma pallens (Maire) Arnolds (1982)
- Entoloma pallescens (P. Karst.) Noordel. (1979)
- Entoloma pallideradicatum Hauskn. & Noordel. (1999)
- Entoloma pallideviolaceum Noordel. & Hauskn. (2007)
- Entoloma pallidiceps Murrill (1946)
- Entoloma pallidipes Hesler (1967)
- Entoloma pallidissimum (Romagn. & Gilles) Noordel. & Co-David (2009)
- Entoloma pallidius (Romagn. & Gilles) Noordel. & Co-David (2009)
- Entoloma pallidobrunneum Murrill (1917)
- Entoloma pallidocarneum (Romagn. & Gilles) Noordel. & Co-David (2009)
- Entoloma pallidocarpum Noordel. & O.V. Morozova (2010)
- Entoloma pallidoflavum (Henn. & E. Nyman) E. Horak (1976)
- Entoloma pallidogilvum (Berk. & Broome) Sacc. (1887)
- Entoloma pallido-olivaceum Hesler (1967)
- Entoloma pallidosalmoneum (Karstedt & Capelari) Blanco-Dios (2020)
- Entoloma pallidosporum (Romagn. & Gilles) Noordel. & Co-David (2009)
- Entoloma pallidostriatum Vila, Noordel. & Dima (2021)
- Entoloma pallidum Murrill (1917)
- Entoloma palmense Wölfel, Noordel. & Dähncke (2001)
- Entoloma paludicola (P.D. Orton) Romagn. (1987)
- Entoloma paludosum (Murrill) Blanco-Dios (2017)
- Entoloma palumbinum E. Ludw. (2007)
- Entoloma palustre Kokkonen (2015)
- Entoloma pamelae Largent (2015)
- Entoloma pamiae (Largent) Blanco-Dios (2015)
- Entoloma pampeanum Speg. (1898)
- Entoloma pandanicola (E. Horak) Noordel. & Co-David (2009)
- Entoloma panniculus (Berk.) Sacc. (1887)
- Entoloma papillatum (Bres.) Dennis (1953)
- Entoloma paraconferendum Reschke, Manz, F. Hampe & Noordel. (2022)
- Entoloma paradoxale Noordel. & Hauskn. (2009)
- Entoloma paragaudatum Kokkonen (2015)
- Entoloma pararhombisporum Noordel., G.M. Jansen, O.V. Morozova, Reschke & Dima (2022)
- Entoloma parasericellum Corner & E. Horak (1980)
- Entoloma parasericeum E. Horak (2008)
- Entoloma parasiticum (Quél.) Kreisel (1984)
- Entoloma pardinum (Romagn.) Noordel. & Co-David (2009)
- Entoloma parkensis (Fr.) Noordel. (1979)
- Entoloma parsonsiae G. Stev. (1962)
- Entoloma parvifructum Xiao L. He, E. Horak & T.H. Li (2015)
- Entoloma parvipapillatum (Murrill) Hesler (1967)
- Entoloma parvisporum (T.J. Baroni, Albertó, Niveiro & B.E. Lechner) Blanco-Dios (2015)
- Entoloma parvistellatum Largent, N. Siegel & T.W. Henkel (2019)
- Entoloma parvocarpum Tkalčec & Mešić (2016)
- Entoloma parvulum Murrill (1917)
- Entoloma parvum (Peck) Hesler (1967)
- Entoloma pascuum (Pers.) Donk (1949)
- Entoloma patagonicum (Singer) Blanco-Dios (2015)
- Entoloma patouillardii Lécuru (2017)
- Entoloma paucifolium (Romagn. & Gilles) Noordel. & Co-David (2009)
- Entoloma peckianum Burt (1902)
- Entoloma peckii Blanco-Dios (2015)
- Entoloma peculiare E. Horak & Corner (1983)
- Entoloma peechiense K.N.A. Raj & Manim. (2017)
- Entoloma pefiense Karstedt & Capelari (2017)
- Entoloma pegleri Courtec. (1984)
- Entoloma peglerianum Blanco-Dios (2015)
- Entoloma pellectum (E. Horak) Blanco-Dios (2015)
- Entoloma pentagonale J.B. Jordal, Noordel. & Dima (2022)
- Entoloma pentagonosporum (G.F. Atk.) Blanco-Dios (2015)
- Entoloma peraffine E. Horak (2008)
- Entoloma peralbidum E. Horak (1973)
- Entoloma perasprellum Corriol, Dima, O.V. Morozova, J.B. Jordal & Noordel. (2021)
- Entoloma perbloxamii Noordel., D.L.V. Co, G.M. Gates & Morgado (2008)
- Entoloma perbrevisporum (Singer) E. Horak (1978)
- Entoloma percandidum Noordel. (1982)
- Entoloma perchalybeum Noordel., J.B. Jordal & Dima (2022)
- Entoloma percoelestinum O.V. Morozova, Noordel., Vila & Bulyonk. (2014)
- Entoloma percognatum Corner & E. Horak (1980)
- Entoloma perconfusum E. Horak (2008)
- Entoloma percrinitum G.M. Gates & Noordel. (2007)
- Entoloma percuboideum Noordel. & Hauskn. (1993)
- Entoloma perdepressum Vila & F. Caball. (2013)
- Entoloma perfidodiscum Vila (2021)
- Entoloma perfidum E. Horak (1980)
- Entoloma perflavidum Manim. & Noordel. (2006)
- Entoloma perflavifolium Noordel. & Co-David (2009)
- Entoloma perfuscum (Largent) Noordel. & Co-David (2009)
- Entoloma perinfundibuliforme Manim. & Noordel. (2006)
- Entoloma peristerinum O.V. Morozova & T.H.G. Pham (2023)
- Entoloma permutatum E. Horak (1978)
- Entoloma perplexum E. Horak (1973)
- Entoloma perrhombisporum Noordel., Dima, J.B. Jordal & O.V. Morozova (2022)
- Entoloma persimile E. Horak (2008)
- Entoloma persoonii Sacc. (1887)
- Entoloma perumbilicatum Hesler (1974)
- Entoloma perundatum (Largent & B.L. Thomps.) Blanco-Dios (2016)
- Entoloma pervelutinum E. Horak (1980)
- Entoloma perzonatum E. Horak (1973)
- Entoloma phaeocarpoides Voto (2022)
- Entoloma phaeocarpum F. Caball., Vila, A. Caball. & Català (2014)
- Entoloma phaeocephalus (Bull.) Quél. (1886)
- Entoloma phaeocyathum Noordel. (1985)
- Entoloma phaeodiscum Vila & F. Caball. (2007)
- Entoloma phaeoleucum Corner & E. Horak (1980)
- Entoloma phaeomarginatum E. Horak (1973)
- Entoloma phaeophthalmum Noordel. & G.M. Gates (2012)
- Entoloma phaeopileatum Tkalčec & Mešić (2016)
- Entoloma phaeoxanthum (Romagn. & Gilles) Noordel. & Co-David (2009)
- Entoloma phaeum (Romagn. & Gilles) Noordel. & Co-David (2009)
- Entoloma philocistus Hauskn. & Noordel. (1999)
- Entoloma phlebodermum Noordel. & Hauskn. (1998)
- Entoloma phleboides (Romagn.) E. Horak (1976)
- Entoloma phlebophyllum J.Q. Yan, L.G. Chen & S.N. Wang (2024)
- Entoloma piceinum O.V. Morozova, E.Yu. Voronina & S.N. Arslanov (2014)
- Entoloma pigmentosipes (Largent) Noordel. & Co-David (2009)
- Entoloma pileifibrosum E. Horak & Cheype (2010)
- Entoloma pilocystidiatum (Largent & Skye Moore) Blanco-Dios (2015)
- Entoloma pilosellum (Romagn. & Gilles) Noordel. & Co-David (2009)
- Entoloma pingue Corner & E. Horak (1980)
- Entoloma pinicola Murrill (1940)
- Entoloma pinnum (Romagn.) Dennis (1953)
- Entoloma pirinoides (Kauffman) Blanco-Dios (2017)
- Entoloma pistorium Corner & E. Horak (1980)
- Entoloma pitereka Noordel. & G.M. Gates (2012)
- Entoloma placidum (Fr.) Noordel. (1981)
- Entoloma planoconvexum (Romagn. & Gilles) Noordel. & Co-David (2009)
- Entoloma platyphylloides (Romagn.) Largent (1974)
- Entoloma platyphyllum Herp. (1912)
- Entoloma platyspermum (Romagn. & Gilles) Noordel. & Co-David (2009)
- Entoloma plebeioides (Schulzer) Noordel. (1985)
- Entoloma plebejopapillatum E. Ludw. (2007)
- Entoloma plebejum (Kalchbr.) Noordel. (1985)
- Entoloma pleopodioides (Rick) Blanco-Dios (2017)
- Entoloma pleopodium (Bull.) Noordel. (1985)
- Entoloma pleropicum (Britzelm.) Sacc. (1887)
- Entoloma pleurotoides Xiao L. He & E. Horak (2019)
- Entoloma plicatum (Largent) Blanco-Dios (2024)
- Entoloma plumbeum Earle (1905)
- Entoloma pluricolor (Romagn. & Gilles) Noordel. & Co-David (2009)
- Entoloma pluteicutis (Romagn. & Gilles) Noordel. (1983)
- Entoloma pluteidermum Arnolds & Noordel. (2004)
- Entoloma pluteiforme Murrill (1917)
- Entoloma pluteimorphum E. Horak (1980)
- Entoloma pluteoides (Fr.) P. Karst. (1879)
- Entoloma poliopus (Romagn.) Noordel. (1979)
- Entoloma poliothrix (Romagn. & Gilles) Noordel. & Co-David (2009)
- Entoloma politoflavipes Noordel. & Liiv (1992)
- Entoloma politum (Pers.) Noordel. (1981)
- Entoloma polyangulatum Noordel. & Hauskn. (2009)
- Entoloma polycolor Blanco-Dios (2017)
- Entoloma polyphyllum (Romagn. & Gilles) Noordel. & Co-David (2009)
- Entoloma pomaceum Velen. (1940)
- Entoloma pontecaldelense Blanco-Dios (2022)
- Entoloma porengii Corner & E. Horak (1980)
- Entoloma porphyrescens E. Horak (1973)
- Entoloma porphyrium (Berk. & Broome) A.M. Young (1997)
- Entoloma porphyrocephalum (Noordel. & Wölfel) Noordel., Brandrud & Dima (2020)
- Entoloma porphyrofibrillosum Noordel. (1984)
- Entoloma porphyrogriseum Noordel. (1987)
- Entoloma porphyroleucum O.V. Morozova, Noordel. & Dima (2020)
- Entoloma porphyrophaeum (Fr.) P. Karst. (1879)
- Entoloma porpoarachnoides (Singer) Singer (1986)
- Entoloma porrectum E. Horak (1986)
- Entoloma portentosum E. Horak (1978)
- Entoloma poymalangta Grgur. (1997)
- Entoloma praecanum Herp. (1912)
- Entoloma praecipuum J.B. Jordal, Noordel. & Dima (2022)
- Entoloma praecox P. Karst. (1893)
- Entoloma praegracile Xiao L. He & T.H. Li (2011)
- Entoloma praeluteum Corner & E. Horak (1980)
- Entoloma praestans Corner & E. Horak (1976)
- Entoloma pratense Hesler (1967)
- Entoloma praticola Sacc. (1895)
- Entoloma pratulense Noordel. (1987)
- Entoloma principale (Britzelm.) Sacc. (1895)
- Entoloma prismaticum Hir. Sasaki, A. Kinosh. & K. Nara (2012)
- Entoloma prismatospermum (Romagn.) E. Horak (1976)
- Entoloma prismosporum Hesler (1967)
- Entoloma probum E. Horak (1980)
- Entoloma proceripes (Romagn. & Gilles) Noordel. & Co-David (2009)
- Entoloma procerum G. Stev. (1962)
- Entoloma propinquum Noordel. & Co-David (2009)
- Entoloma proprium E. Horak (1980)
- Entoloma prostratum (Cleland) E. Horak (1980)
- Entoloma proterum Noordel. & Wölfel (1987)
- Entoloma proximum E. Horak (1978)
- Entoloma pruinatum E. Horak (1983)
- Entoloma pruinosipes (Singer) E. Horak (1978)
- Entoloma pruinosocutis Manim. & Noordel. (2006)
- Entoloma pruinosum Reschke, Manz & Noordel. (2022)
- Entoloma prunuloides (Fr.) Quél. (1872)
- Entoloma psammophilohebes Vila & J. Fernández (2013)
- Entoloma pseudobulbipes (Largent) Noordel. & Co-David (2009)
- Entoloma pseudocoelestinum Arnolds (1982)
- Entoloma pseudoconferendum Noordel. & Wölfel (2004)
- Entoloma pseudocostatum Largent (1994)
- Entoloma pseudocruentatum Noordel., Brandrud, G.M. Jansen, Dima & Læssøe (2021)
- Entoloma pseudocyanulum Wölfel (2011)
- Entoloma pseudocystidiatum (Romagn. & Gilles) Noordel. & Co-David (2009)
- Entoloma pseudodenticulatum (Romagn. & Gilles) Noordel. & Co-David (2009)
- Entoloma pseudodochmiopus (Romagn. & Gilles) Noordel. & Co-David (2009)
- Entoloma pseudodysthales Noordel., Tabarés & Rocabruna (1992)
- Entoloma pseudoexcentricum (Romagn.) Zschiesch. (1984)
- Entoloma pseudofavrei Noordel. & Vila (2013)
- Entoloma pseudogriseoalbum Z.S. Bi (1986)
- Entoloma pseudoheimii Eyssart., Buyck & Courtec. (2001)
- Entoloma pseudohirtipes (Largent) Noordel. & Co-David (2009)
- Entoloma pseudolividum Largent (1994)
- Entoloma pseudomolliusculum (Romagn. & Gilles) Noordel. (1987)
- Entoloma pseudomurrayi Eyssart., Ducousso & Buyck (2010)
- Entoloma pseudonigellum E. Ludw. & Noordel. (2007)
- Entoloma pseudonothofagi E. Horak & Garrido (1988)
- Entoloma pseudopapillatum (Pegler) Courtec. & Fiard (2004)
- Entoloma pseudoparasiticum Noordel. (1992)
- Entoloma pseudoprunuloides Morgado & Noordel. (2013)
- Entoloma pseudorhodopolium Kondo & Nagas. (2017)
- Entoloma pseudorrhombosporum (Romagn. & Gilles) Noordel. & Co-David (2009)
- Entoloma pseudosericeoides Noordel. & Hauskn. (1998)
- Entoloma pseudosericeum Largent (1994)
- Entoloma pseudostrictium (Largent) Noordel. & Co-David (2009)
- Entoloma pseudosubcorvinum Kumla, Suwannar. & S. Lumyong (2022)
- Entoloma pseudotruncatum (Romagn. & Gilles) Noordel. & Co-David (2009)
- Entoloma pseudoturci Noordel. (1984)
- Entoloma pseudovenosum Largent (1994)
- Entoloma psilocyboides G.M. Gates & Noordel. (2009)
- Entoloma psittacinum (Romagn.) E. Horak (1976)
- Entoloma pteridicola G. Stev. (1962)
- Entoloma pubescens Murrill (1917)
- Entoloma pudens Noordel., G.M. Jansen, M.v.d. Vegte & Dima (2021)
- Entoloma pudicum (Romagn. & Gilles) Noordel. & Co-David (2009)
- Entoloma puertoricense Blanco-Dios (2015)
- Entoloma pulchellum (Hongo) Hongo (2010)
- Entoloma pulcherrimum (Romagn.) Noordel. & Co-David (2009)
- Entoloma pulchripes O.V. Morozova, Noordel., Brandrud & Dima (2021)
- Entoloma pullum Hesler (1967)
- Entoloma pulvereum Rea (1907)
- Entoloma pulveripes (Romagn. & Gilles) Noordel. & Co-David (2009)
- Entoloma pulverulentum Corner & E. Horak (1980)
- Entoloma pumanquense (Singer) E. Horak (1978)
- Entoloma pumilum E. Horak (2008)
- Entoloma punctipes Noordel. & Hauskn. (2015)
- Entoloma punctipileum (Romagn. & Gilles) Noordel. & Co-David (2009)
- Entoloma punctulatum (Romagn.) Noordel. & Co-David (2009)
- Entoloma pungens (A.H. Sm. & Hesler) Courtec. (1984)
- Entoloma punjabense N. Fatima, Usman & Khalid (2023)
- Entoloma puroides E. Horak (1980)
- Entoloma purpureobrunneum W.M. Zhang (1994)
- Entoloma purpureofuscum Noordel. & G.M. Gates (2012)
- Entoloma purpureomarginatum Arnolds (1982)
- Entoloma purpureopunctatum (Rick) Blanco-Dios (2017)
- Entoloma purpureum Petch (1924)
- Entoloma purum E. Horak & Desjardin (1993)
- Entoloma pusilliforme Romagn. (1987)
- Entoloma pusillipapillatum (Largent) Noordel. & Co-David (2009)
- Entoloma pusillum Noordel. (1984)
- Entoloma pustulatum Velen. (1928)
- Entoloma putidum Hesler (1967)
- Entoloma pygmaeopapillatum Arnolds & Winterh. (1986)
- Entoloma pyrinum (Berk. & M.A. Curtis) Hesler (1967)
- Entoloma pyropus Noordel. & G.M. Gates (2012)

== Q ==
- Entoloma quadratum (Berk. & M.A. Curtis) E. Horak (1976)
- Entoloma quadrosporum (Largent & O.K. Mill.) Noordel. & Co-David (2009)
- Entoloma queletii (Boud.) Noordel. (1983)
- Entoloma quellarense J.M. Vidal & Faust. García (2016)
- Entoloma quercetorum Kokkonen (2021)
- Entoloma quercophilum (Largent) Noordel. & Co-David (2009)
- Entoloma querquedula (Romagn.) Noordel. (1982)

== R ==
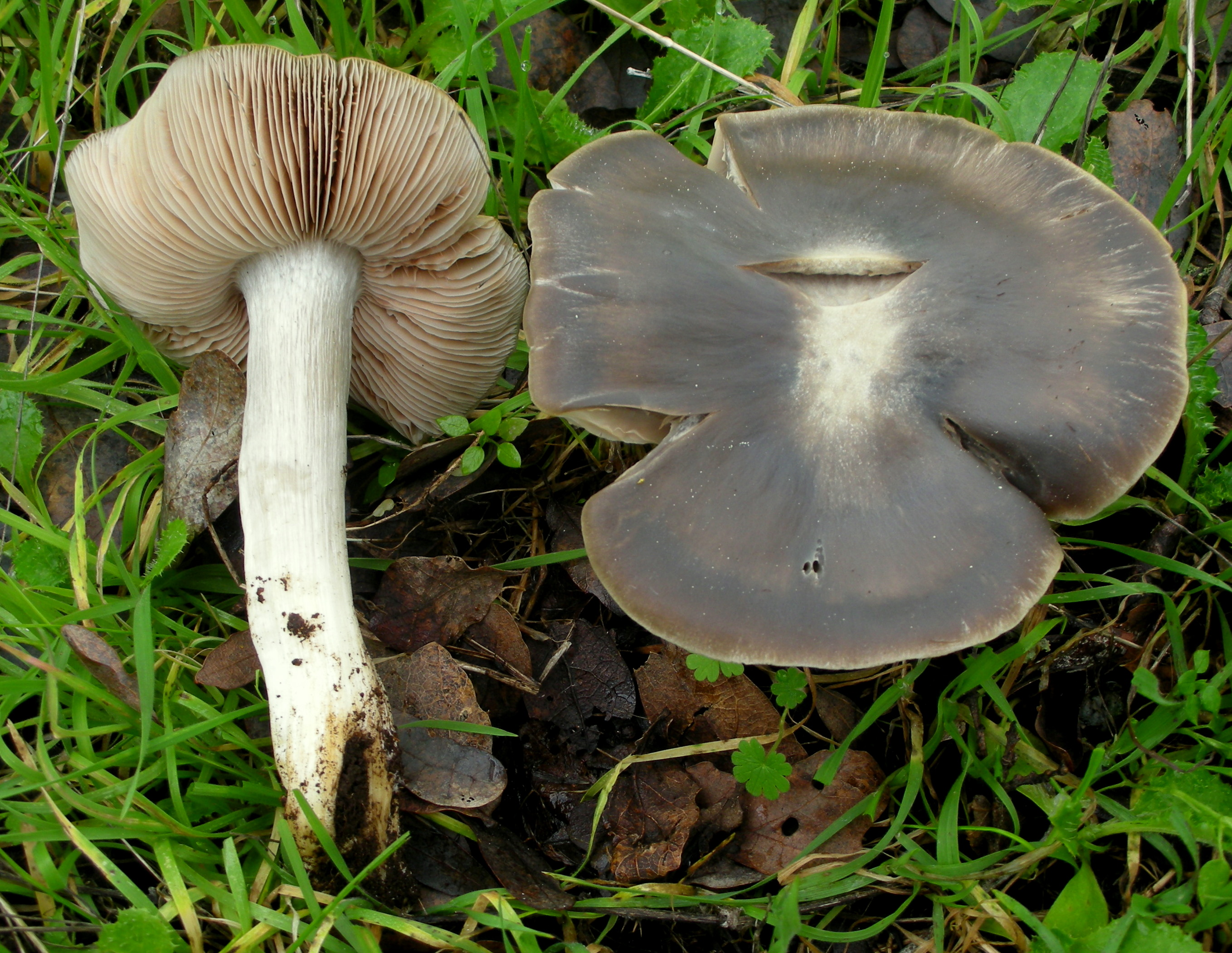
Entoloma rhodopolium

- Entoloma radicatum Pegler (1977)
- Entoloma radicipes Kokkonen (2015)
- Entoloma rancidissimum E. Horak (1980)
- Entoloma rancidodorum Noordel. & Hauskn. (2002)
- Entoloma rancidulum E. Horak (1973)
- Entoloma ravinense P.S. Catches., Vonow & D.E.A. Catches. (2016)
- Entoloma ravum (Largent & Aime) Blanco-Dios (2015)
- Entoloma readiae G. Stev. (1962)
- Entoloma reae (Maire) Noordel. (1992)
- Entoloma rectangulum (Largent) Noordel. & Co-David (2009)
- Entoloma reductum E. Horak (1978)
- Entoloma reginae Noordel. & Chrispijn (1996)
- Entoloma regulare (Peck) Blanco-Dios (2017)
- Entoloma reinwaldii Noordel. & Hauskn. (2000)
- Entoloma remotum (Romagn. & Gilles) Noordel. & Co-David (2009)
- Entoloma repandum (Bull.) Fr. (1874)
- Entoloma repens (Petch) Blanco-Dios (2017)
- Entoloma reunionense Noordel. & Hauskn. (2007)
- Entoloma rhodanthes (Romagn.) Noordel. & Co-David (2009)
- Entoloma rhodellum (Romagn.) Noordel. & Co-David (2009)
- Entoloma rhodocylicioides (G.F. Atk.) Blanco-Dios (2015)
- Entoloma rhodocylix (Lasch) M.M. Moser (1978)
- Entoloma rhododendri (T.J. Baroni & R.H. Petersen) T.J. Baroni & Matheny (2011)
- Entoloma rhodopheum Bres. (1890)
- Entoloma rhodopolium (Fr.) P. Kumm. (1871)
- Entoloma rhombiibericum Vila, Dima & Noordel. (2022)
- Entoloma rhombisporoides Noordel., O.V. Morozova & Dima (2022)
- Entoloma rhombisporum (Kühner & Boursier) E. Horak (1976)
- Entoloma rhynchocystidiatum Noordel. & Liiv (1992)
- Entoloma rickenelliformis E. Ludw. (2007)
- Entoloma rickianum Blanco-Dios (2017)
- Entoloma rickii Blanco-Dios (2017)
- Entoloma riedheimense Noordel. & Enderle (1995)
- Entoloma rigens (Romagn. & Gilles) Noordel. & Co-David (2009)
- Entoloma rigidipus (Largent) Noordel. & Co-David (2009)
- Entoloma rigidulum Velen. (1940)
- Entoloma rimosiceps E. Horak (1980)
- Entoloma rimosum Hesler (1967)
- Entoloma rimulosum Noordel. (1984)
- Entoloma riofriense Esteve-Rav. & Noordel. (2004)
- Entoloma riograndense Blanco-Dios (2017)
- Entoloma riparium Vila, Marulli & Battistin (2021)
- Entoloma ripartitoides E. Horak (1978)
- Entoloma ritae Noordel. & Wölfel (1998)
- Entoloma rivipollense Vila (2021)
- Entoloma rivulare Kokkonen (2015)
- Entoloma rivulosum Largent (1994)
- Entoloma roanense Hesler (1967)
- Entoloma robiniae (Velen.) Noordel. (1979)
- Entoloma robinsonii (Berk. & Mont.) Sacc. (1887)
- Entoloma rodwayi (Massee) E. Horak (1980)
- Entoloma romagnesianum Courtec. (1984)
- Entoloma romagnesii Noordel. (1979)
- Entoloma roseicinnamomeum (Largent) Noordel. & Co-David (2009)
- Entoloma rosemarieae Wölfel & Noordel. (2001)
- Entoloma roseoalbum Arnolds & Noordel. (2004)
- Entoloma roseobrunneum (Murrill) Blanco-Dios (2017)
- Entoloma roseoflavum Noordel. & O.V. Morozova (2010)
- Entoloma roseoluteolum G.M. Gates & Noordel. (2007)
- Entoloma roseomurinum (Romagn. & Gilles) Noordel. & Co-David (2009)
- Entoloma roseotinctum Noordel. & Liiv (1992)
- Entoloma roseotransparens Noordel. & Hauskn. (2007)
- Entoloma roseum (Longyear) Hesler (1967)
- Entoloma rostellatum Velen. (1940)
- Entoloma rostratum (Largent) Noordel. & Co-David (2009)
- Entoloma rotula (Romagn.) Noordel. & Co-David (2009)
- Entoloma rotundatisporum E. Ludw. & Noordel. (2007)
- Entoloma rotundisporum E. Horak (1980)
- Entoloma rozei Quél. (1878)
- Entoloma rubellum (Scop.) Gillet (1876)
- Entoloma rubescentipes E. Horak (1973)
- Entoloma rubrobasis Noordel. (1992)
- Entoloma rubrobrunneum Murrill (1917)
- Entoloma rubromaculatum Corner & E. Horak (1980)
- Entoloma rubromarginatum E. Horak (1973)
- Entoloma rubropilosum Xiao L. He & E. Horak (2018)
- Entoloma rubrotinctum Tkalčec & Mešić (2016)
- Entoloma rufobasis G.M. Gates & Noordel. (2007)
- Entoloma rufocarneum (Berk.) Noordel. (1985)
- Entoloma rufomarginatum J.Q. Yan, L.G. Chen & S.N. Wang (2024)
- Entoloma rufovinascens Eyssart., Buyck & Courtec. (2001)
- Entoloma rufum (Romagn. & Gilles) Noordel. & Co-David (2009)
- Entoloma rugiferum (Romagn. & Gilles) Noordel. & Co-David (2009)
- Entoloma rugosissimum E. Horak (1980)
- Entoloma rugosiviscosum Largent (2015)
- Entoloma rugosopruinatum Corner & E. Horak (1980)
- Entoloma rugosostriatum Largent & T.W. Henkel (2008)
- Entoloma rugosum (Malençon) Bon (1983)
- Entoloma rugulosum Hesler (1967)
- Entoloma rupestre (Largent & Abell-Davis) Blanco-Dios (2015)
- Entoloma rusticoides (Gillet) Noordel. (1981)

== S ==
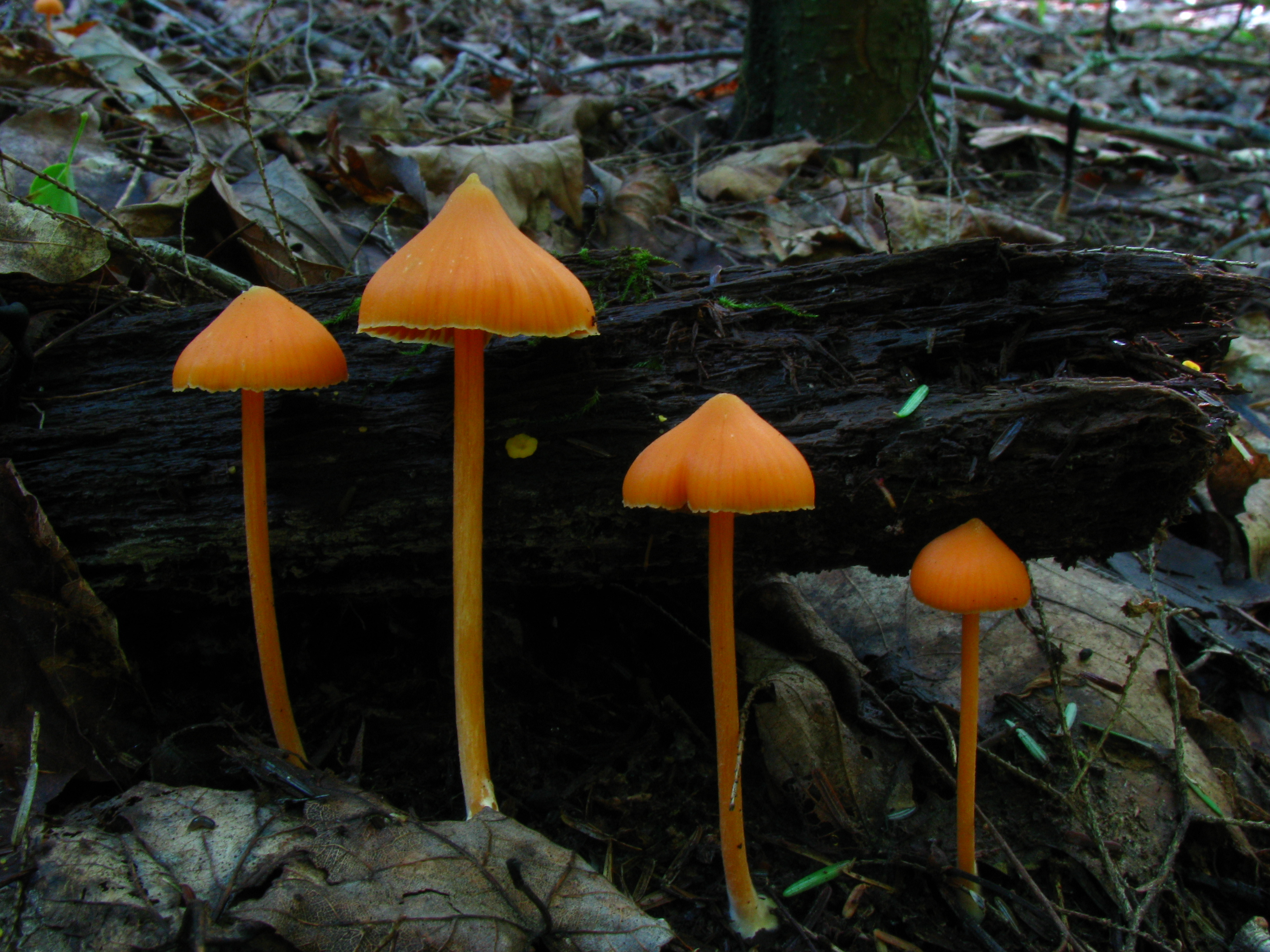
Entoloma salmoneum

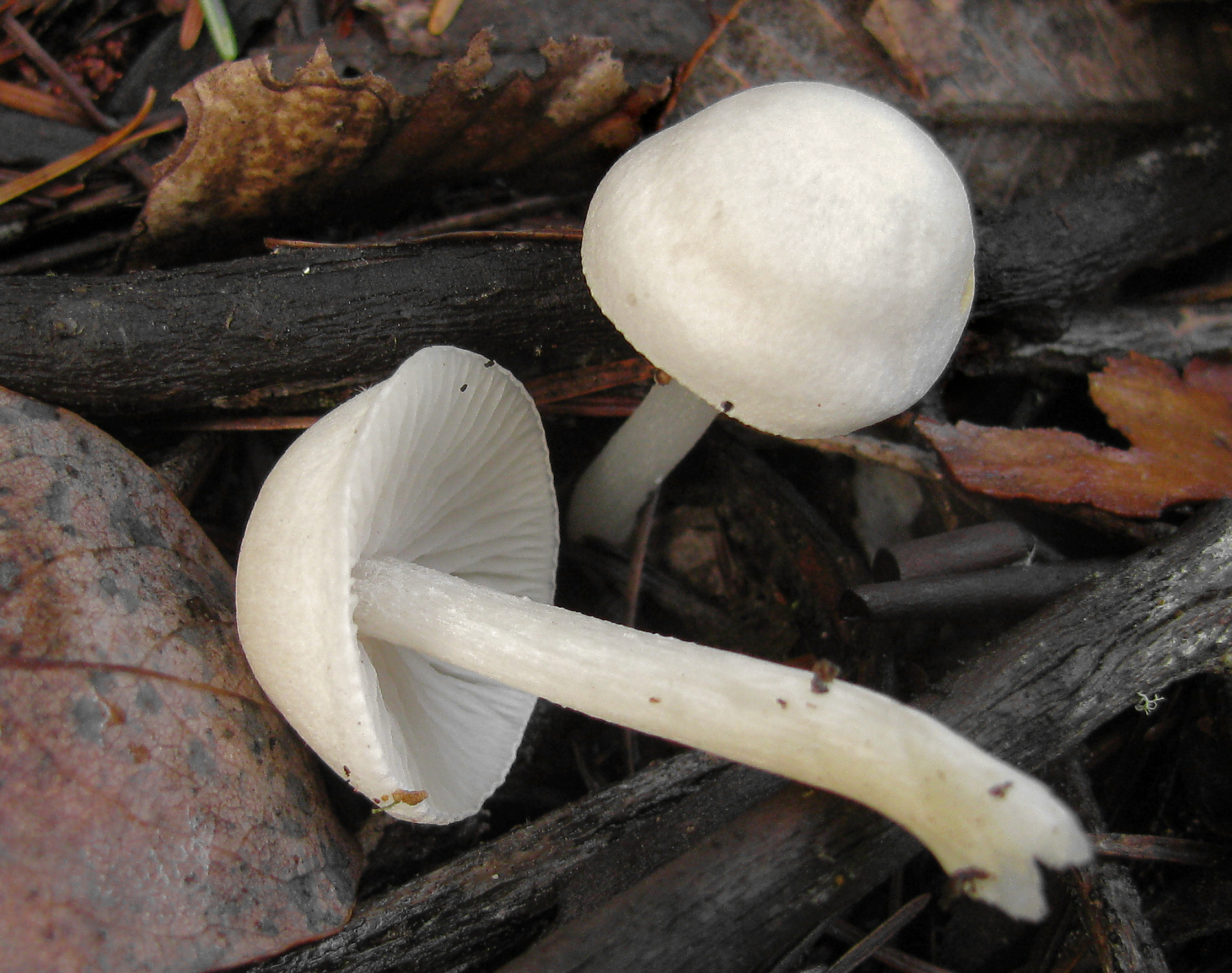
Entoloma sericellum

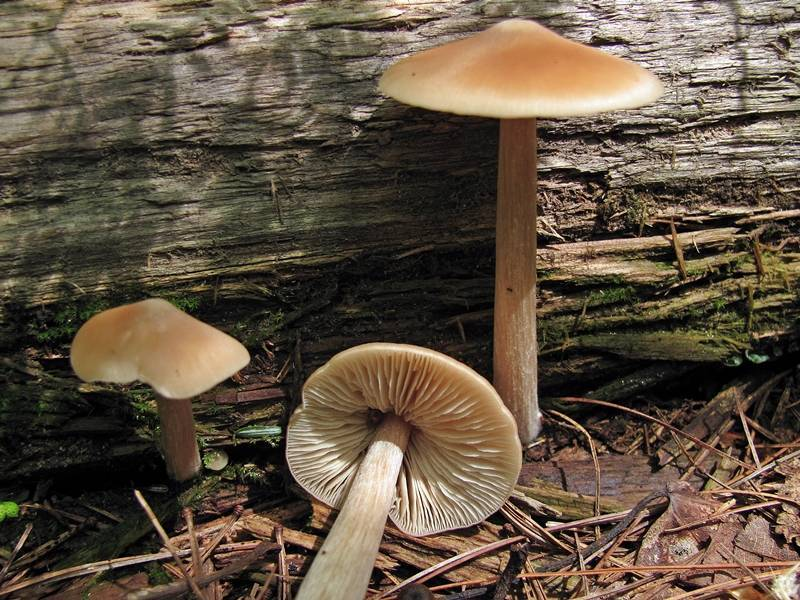
Entoloma strictius

- Entoloma sabulosum (Romagn. & Gilles) Noordel. & Co-David (2009)
- Entoloma sacchariolens (Romagn.) Noordel. (1980)
- Entoloma salicetense J.M. Vidal (2016)
- Entoloma salmoneum (Peck) Sacc. (1887)
- Entoloma saltense Blanco-Dios (2015)
- Entoloma sandlakense Blanco-Dios (2017)
- Entoloma sanvitalense Noordel. & Hauskn. (1998)
- Entoloma saponicum G.M. Gates & Noordel. (2009)
- Entoloma sarcitum (Fr.) Noordel. (1981)
- Entoloma sarcopus Nagas. & Hongo (1999)
- Entoloma sassafras G.M. Gates & Noordel. (2009)
- Entoloma saundersii (Fr.) Sacc. (1887)
- Entoloma saussetiense Eyssart. & Noordel. (2009)
- Entoloma scabiosum (Fr.) Quél. (1886)
- Entoloma scabrinellum (Peck) Sacc. (1887)
- Entoloma scabripes E. Horak (2008)
- Entoloma scabropellis Noordel. (1984)
- Entoloma scabrosum (Fr.) Noordel. (1985)
- Entoloma scabrulosum (Largent) Noordel. & Co-David (2009)
- Entoloma schistaceum (Mont.) Sacc. (1887)
- Entoloma sclerobasidiatum (Romagn. & Gilles) Noordel. & Co-David (2009)
- Entoloma seattlense Blanco-Dios (2017)
- Entoloma secotioides J. García, Guevara & J.I. Fuente (2023)
- Entoloma sejugatum Eyssart. & Buyck (2014)
- Entoloma semiglobatum (Murrill) Blanco-Dios (2017)
- Entoloma semilanceatum (Romagn.) E. Horak (1976)
- Entoloma separatum (Largent) Noordel. & Co-David (2009)
- Entoloma sepiaceobasale (E. Horak) Blanco-Dios (2015)
- Entoloma sepiaceovelutinum G.M. Gates & Noordel. (2007)
- Entoloma sepium (Noulet & Dass.) Richon & Roze (1880)
- Entoloma septentrionale Noordel., Lorås, Eidissen & Dima (2021)
- Entoloma sequestratum T.F. Elliott, S.L. Stephenson, Karun. & D. Nelsen (2020)
- Entoloma sericatum (Britzelm.) Sacc. (1895)
- Entoloma sericellum (Fr.) P. Kumm. (1871)
- Entoloma sericeoalpinum Vila, P.-A. Moreau, Corriol & Reschke (2021)
- Entoloma sericeoides (J.E. Lange) Noordel. (1980)
- Entoloma sericeonitens (P.D. Orton) Noordel. (1980)
- Entoloma sericeum Quél. (1872)
- Entoloma serpens Kokkonen (2015)
- Entoloma serratomarginatum E. Horak (1980)
- Entoloma serrulatum (Fr.) Hesler (1967)
- Entoloma setastipes Hesler (1967)
- Entoloma setiforme (Largent & Abell-Davis) Blanco-Dios (2015)
- Entoloma setulosum (Velen.) Blanco-Dios (2017)
- Entoloma shandongense T. Bau & J.R. Wang (2013)
- Entoloma shwethum Manim., A.V. Joseph & Leelav. (1995)
- Entoloma sicoense Fachada, Pedreiro, Raimundo, Noordel., Dima & G. Marques (2023)
- Entoloma significum Corner & E. Horak (1977)
- Entoloma silvae-araucariae de Meijer (2009)
- Entoloma silvae-frondosae Dima, O.V. Morozova, Noordel., Brandrud & Krisai (2018)
- Entoloma silvanum K.N.A. Raj & Manim. (2017)
- Entoloma simile (Rick) Blanco-Dios (2017)
- Entoloma simillimum Corner & E. Horak (1980)
- Entoloma simplex (Romagn.) Noordel. & Co-David (2009)
- Entoloma simulans Reschke, Karich, Corriol, G.M. Jansen & Dima (2022)
- Entoloma singeri Mešić & Tkalčec (2016)
- Entoloma singerianum Blanco-Dios (2017)
- Entoloma singulare (Romagn.) Bon & Courtec. (1987)
- Entoloma singularisporum Corner & E. Horak (1980)
- Entoloma sinuatum (Bull.) P. Kumm. (1871)
- Entoloma sinuolatum (Largent, Aime & T.W. Henkel) Blanco-Dios (2015)
- Entoloma siparianum Dennis (1953)
- Entoloma smaragdinum Corner & E. Horak (1980)
- Entoloma sodale Kühner & Romagn. ex Noordel. (1982)
- Entoloma solstitiale (Fr.) Noordel. (1980)
- Entoloma sordidolamellatum Noordel. & Enderle (1995)
- Entoloma sordidulum (Kühner & Romagn.) P.D. Orton (1960)
- Entoloma sororpratulense J.B. Jordal, Karich, Dima & Noordel. (2022)
- Entoloma spadiceum Hesler (1967)
- Entoloma spadix Hesler (1967)
- Entoloma sparsicystis E. Horak & Singer (1982)
- Entoloma speciosum (Romagn.) Putzke & M. Putzke ex Courtec. (2006)
- Entoloma speculum (Fr.) Quél. (1872)
- Entoloma spermaticum (Romagn. & Gilles) Noordel. & Co-David (2009)
- Entoloma spermatiolens E. Horak (1980)
- Entoloma sphaerocystis Noordel. (1980)
- Entoloma sphaerosporum (Sacc. & Trotter) Blanco-Dios (2015)
- Entoloma sphagneti Naveau (1923)
- Entoloma sphagnophilum (Peck) Blanco-Dios (2017)
- Entoloma sphagnorum (Romagn. & J. Favre) Bon & Courtec. (1987)
- Entoloma spiculosum Corner & E. Horak (1980)
- Entoloma spilotum (Holmsk.) Cooke ex Sacc. & P. Syd. (1899)
- Entoloma spineum E. Horak & Singer (1982)
- Entoloma splendens (Mazzer) Blanco-Dios (2017)
- Entoloma splendidum Noordel. & G.M. Gates (2012)
- Entoloma spodopus Montañez, Noordel. & Guzm.-Dáv. (2016)
- Entoloma spurium (Romagn. & Gilles) Noordel. & Co-David (2009)
- Entoloma squalidum (Maire) Blanco-Dios (2017)
- Entoloma squamatum Hesler (1974)
- Entoloma squamiferum E. Horak (1973)
- Entoloma squamifolium (Murrill) Singer (1986)
- Entoloma squamodiscum Hesler (1967)
- Entoloma squamosipes F. Caball. & Vila (2013)
- Entoloma squamulosum Hesler (1967)
- Entoloma staritzii (Henn.) Blanco-Dios (2017)
- Entoloma staudtii (Henn.) Blanco-Dios (2016)
- Entoloma stellatum G.M. Gates & Noordel. (2007)
- Entoloma stevensoniae E. Horak (1980)
- Entoloma stramineopallescens G.M. Gates & Noordel. (2007)
- Entoloma stramineum E. Horak (2008)
- Entoloma striatoundatum E. Ludw. & Noordel. (2007)
- Entoloma striatum Hesler (1974)
- Entoloma strictius (Peck) Sacc. (1887)
- Entoloma strictum G. Stev. (1962)
- Entoloma strigosissimum (Rea) Noordel. (1979)
- Entoloma strigosum G.M. Gates & Noordel. (2009)
- Entoloma striipes (Rick) Blanco-Dios (2017)
- Entoloma stylobates (Romagn. & Gilles) Noordel. & Co-David (2009)
- Entoloma stylophorum (Berk. & Broome) Sacc. (1887)
- Entoloma suave Peck (1908)
- Entoloma suaveolens C.K. Pradeep & K.B. Vrinda (2012)
- Entoloma subacum (Peck) Blanco-Dios (2015)
- Entoloma subaeruginosum Courtec. (1986)
- Entoloma subalbidulum (Romagn. & Gilles) Noordel. & Co-David (2009)
- Entoloma subalbidum Murrill (1940)
- Entoloma subaltissimum T.H. Li & Chuan H. Li (2009)
- Entoloma subaraneosum Xiao L. He & T.H. Li (2012)
- Entoloma subarcticum Noordel. (1984)
- Entoloma subavellaneum (Murrill) Blanco-Dios (2017)
- Entoloma subbulbosum (Romagn. & Gilles) Noordel. & Co-David (2009)
- Entoloma subcaelestinum (Singer) Singer (1986)
- Entoloma subcaeruleum Hesler (1967)
- Entoloma subcaesiellum Noordel. & O.V. Morozova (2010)
- Entoloma subcaesiocinctum Xiao L. He & W.H. Peng (2017)
- Entoloma subcapitatum (Largent) Noordel. & Co-David (2009)
- Entoloma subcarneum (Largent) Blanco-Dios (2015)
- Entoloma subclitocyboides W.M. Zhang (1994)
- Entoloma subcoelestinum (Largent) Blanco-Dios (2015)
- Entoloma subcollariatum (Kühner) Bon (1991)
- Entoloma subcommune Murrill (1940)
- Entoloma subconicum (Murrill) Hesler (1967)
- Entoloma subcoracis O.V. Morozova, Noordel. & Dima (2021)
- Entoloma subcorvinum Hesler (1967)
- Entoloma subcostatum G.F. Atk. (1906)
- Entoloma subcuboideum Noordel., J.B. Jordal, Vila & Dima (2022)
- Entoloma subcycneum J.Q. Yan, L.G. Chen & S.N. Wang (2024)
- Entoloma subdeceptivum Courtec. (1984)
- Entoloma subdepluens (Fitzp.) Blanco-Dios (2015)
- Entoloma subdepressum Blanco-Dios (2016)
- Entoloma subeccentricum W.M. Zhang (1994)
- Entoloma subelegans Noordel. & Hauskn. (2015)
- Entoloma subeuchroum (Kauffman) Mešić & Tkalčec (2016)
- Entoloma subfarinaceum Hesler (1967)
- Entoloma subflexipes (Kühner) Noordel. (1981)
- Entoloma subfloridanum (Murrill) Hesler (1967)
- Entoloma subfurfuraceum Hesler (1974)
- Entoloma subfuscum Hesler (1967)
- Entoloma subfusiferum (Romagn. & Gilles) Noordel. & Co-David (2009)
- Entoloma subglabrum (Romagn.) Noordel. & Co-David (2009)
- Entoloma subglobisporum Kalamees (1989)
- Entoloma subgoniosporum (Speg.) E. Horak (1978)
- Entoloma subgracile (Largent) Noordel. & Co-David (2009)
- Entoloma subgriseum Hesler (1967)
- Entoloma subhexagonosporum Corner & E. Horak (1980)
- Entoloma subhirtipes Hesler (1967)
- Entoloma subinfundibuliforme T.H. Li & Chuan H. Li (2009)
- Entoloma subinocybiforme Hesler (1967)
- Entoloma subjubatum Murrill (1917)
- Entoloma sublaevisporum Vila, Noordel. & O.V. Morozova (2014)
- Entoloma sublatifolium (Romagn. & Gilles) Noordel. & Co-David (2009)
- Entoloma sublividum (Britzelm.) Sacc. (1895)
- Entoloma sublucidum Murrill (1946)
- Entoloma submurinum (Pat.) E. Horak (1980)
- Entoloma submurrayi J.Q. Yan, L.G. Chen & S.N. Wang (2024)
- Entoloma subnigrum (Murrill) Hesler (1967)
- Entoloma subnitidum S. Imai (1938)
- Entoloma subochraceum Blanco-Dios (2015)
- Entoloma subpallidiceps Hesler (1967)
- Entoloma subpanniculus (Largent & Bergemann) Blanco-Dios (2016)
- Entoloma subparvulum Blanco-Dios (2017)
- Entoloma subpiceum (Murrill) Blanco-Dios (2017)
- Entoloma subplanum (Peck) Hesler (1967)
- Entoloma subplicatum Hesler (1967)
- Entoloma subpolitum Largent (1994)
- Entoloma subpungens Blanco-Dios (2017)
- Entoloma subpusillum (Pilát) Romagn. (1987)
- Entoloma subquadratum Hesler (1967)
- Entoloma subradiatum (Kühner & Romagn.) M.M. Moser (1978)
- Entoloma subrhodopolium Kondo & Nagas. (2017)
- Entoloma subrhombisporum Hesler (1967)
- Entoloma subrhombospermum (Romagn. & Gilles) Noordel. & Co-David (2009)
- Entoloma subrimosum Hesler (1967)
- Entoloma subroseum (T.J. Baroni & Lodge) Noordel. & Co-David (2009)
- Entoloma subrotundisporum Illice & Todesch. (2013)
- Entoloma subrubens P. Karst. (1879)
- Entoloma subrubineum (Largent & B.L. Thomps.) Noordel. & Co-David (2009)
- Entoloma subsaundersii Largent (1994)
- Entoloma subsepiaceum (Kühner) Noordel. (1984)
- Entoloma subsericellum Murrill (1917)
- Entoloma subsericeoides (Largent) Noordel. & Co-David (2009)
- Entoloma subserrulatum (Peck) Hesler (1967)
- Entoloma subsinuatum Murrill (1917)
- Entoloma subsolstitiale (Largent) Noordel. & Co-David (2009)
- Entoloma subsquamosum (Romagn.) Noordel. & Co-David (2009)
- Entoloma substaurosporum (Murrill) Blanco-Dios (2017)
- Entoloma substrictius Murrill (1939))
- Entoloma substrictum (Largent & Bergemann) Blanco-Dios (2016)
- Entoloma subsulcatum (Largent & T.W. Henkel) Tkalčec & Mešić (2016)
- Entoloma subtenuicystidiatum Xiao L. He & T.H. Li (2012)
- Entoloma subtenuipes Murrill (1945)
- Entoloma subtile E. Horak (1980)
- Entoloma subtruncatum Peck (1912)
- Entoloma subumbilicatum Hesler (1967)
- Entoloma subviduense (Largent) Noordel. & Co-David (2009)
- Entoloma subvile (Peck) Hesler (1967)
- Entoloma subviolaceovernum (Largent) Noordel. & Co-David (2009)
- Entoloma sulcatum (T.J. Baroni & Lodge) Noordel. & Co-David (2009)
- Entoloma svalbardense Noordel. (2004)
- Entoloma syringicolor E. Ludw. & Noordel. (2007)

== T ==
- Entoloma tabacinum (Cleland) E. Horak (1980)
- Entoloma tadungense O.V. Morozova & T.H.G. Pham (2023)
- Entoloma taedium E. Horak (1978)
- Entoloma talisporum Corner & E. Horak (1976)
- Entoloma tasmanicum Noordel. & G.M. Gates (2012)
- Entoloma tasmaniense Blanco-Dios (2017)
- Entoloma tectonicola Manim. & Noordel. (2006)
- Entoloma tectum E. Horak (2008)
- Entoloma tembelingii Corner & E. Horak (1980)
- Entoloma tenacipes Corner & E. Horak (1980)
- Entoloma tenebricosum E. Horak (1978)
- Entoloma tenebricum E. Ludw. (2007)
- Entoloma tenebrosum (Romagn. & Gilles) Noordel. & Co-David (2009)
- Entoloma tenellum (J. Favre) Noordel. (1979)
- Entoloma tengii W.M. Zhang & T.H. Li (2002)
- Entoloma tennesseense Blanco-Dios (2020)
- Entoloma tenue (Karstedt & Capelari) Blanco-Dios (2015)
- Entoloma tenuiculum Corner & E. Horak (1980)
- Entoloma tenuicystidiatum G.M. Gates & Noordel. (2009)
- Entoloma tenuipes Murrill (1917)
- Entoloma tenuipileum (Romagn. & Gilles) Noordel. & Co-David (2009)
- Entoloma tenuissimum T.H. Li & Xiao L. He (2012)
- Entoloma tephreum Hesler (1967)
- Entoloma tephrocybe (Singer) Blanco-Dios (2015)
- Entoloma termitophilum E. Horak (1980)
- Entoloma terreum Esteve-Rav. & Noordel. (2004)
- Entoloma testaceostrigosum Manim. & Noordel. (2006)
- Entoloma testaceum (Bres.) Noordel. (1987)
- Entoloma theekshnagandhum Manim., A.V. Joseph & Leelav. (1995)
- Entoloma thiersii (Largent) Noordel. & Co-David (2009)
- Entoloma tianmushanense Y.Y. Shen & Y.B. Song (2024)
- Entoloma tibiicystidiatum Arnolds & Noordel. (1979)
- Entoloma tibiiforme (Largent & Aime) Blanco-Dios (2015)
- Entoloma tigrinellum (Romagn.) Noordel. & Co-David (2009)
- Entoloma tigrinum Noordel., O.V. Morozova, Brandrud, J.B. Jordal & Dima (2021)
- Entoloma tiliae Brandrud, O.V. Morozova, Dima, Bendiksen & Noordel. (2018)
- Entoloma timidum O.V. Morozova, Noordel., Brandrud, J.B. Jordal & Dima (2021)
- Entoloma titthiophorum (Romagn. & Gilles) Noordel. & Co-David (2009)
- Entoloma tjallingiorum Noordel. (1982)
- Entoloma tomentosolilacinum G.M. Gates & Noordel. (2007)
- Entoloma tomentosum Z.S. Bi (1986)
- Entoloma tomentosum J.Q. Yan, L.G. Chen & S.N. Wang (2024)
- Entoloma tortile (Romagn.) Noordel. & Co-David (2009)
- Entoloma tortiliforme F. Hampe, Kleine & Wölfel (2012)
- Entoloma tortipes Murrill (1917)
- Entoloma tortuosum Hesler (1967)
- Entoloma totialbum G.M. Gates & Noordel. (2009)
- Entoloma totivillosum Corner & E. Horak (1980)
- Entoloma transformatum (Peck) Noordel. (2008)
- Entoloma transitionisporum Reschke, Manz & Noordel. (2022)
- Entoloma transitum (E. Horak) Noordel. & Co-David (2009)
- Entoloma translucidum E. Horak (1973)
- Entoloma transmutans G.M. Gates & Noordel. (2009)
- Entoloma transvenosum Noordel. (1982)
- Entoloma tricholomatoideum (Karstedt & Capelari) Blanco-Dios (2020)
- Entoloma trichomarginatum Llorens van Wav. & Llistos. (2010)
- Entoloma trichomatum (Largent) Noordel. & Co-David (2009)
- Entoloma tricolor (Massee) E. Horak (1980)
- Entoloma trinitense Dennis (1953)
- Entoloma triste (Velen.) Noordel. (1979)
- Entoloma tristificum E. Horak (1973)
- Entoloma tristissimum (Romagn. & Gilles) Noordel. & Co-David (2009)
- Entoloma triviale (Kauffman) Largent (1971)
- Entoloma tropicum K.N.A. Raj & Manim. (2017)
- Entoloma truncatum (Romagn.) Noordel. & Co-David (2009)
- Entoloma tubaeforme T.H. Li, Battistin, W.Q. Deng & Gelardi (2021)
- Entoloma turbidatum (Britzelm.) Sacc. (1895)
- Entoloma turbidiforme (Romagn. & Gilles) Noordel. & Co-David (2009)
- Entoloma turci (Bres.) M.M. Moser (1978)
- Entoloma tympaniferum (E. Horak) Blanco-Dios (2015)

== U ==
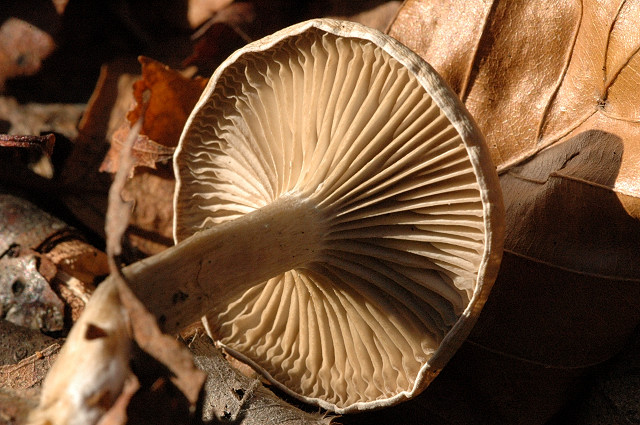
Entoloma undatum

- Entoloma uliginicola E. Horak (1980)
- Entoloma uliginosum Kobayasi (1954)
- Entoloma umbilicatum Dennis (1953)
- Entoloma umbiliciforme Hesler (1974)
- Entoloma umbonatum Massee (1914)
- Entoloma umbrinellum (S. Imai) Noordel. & Co-David (2009)
- Entoloma umbrinum Hesler (1967)
- Entoloma umbrophilum Noordel. & Hauskn. (2007)
- Entoloma umbrosum (Romagn. & Gilles) Noordel. & Co-David (2009)
- Entoloma undatoides Arnolds (1982)
- Entoloma undatum (Gillet) M.M. Moser (1978)
- Entoloma underwoodii Dennis (1953)
- Entoloma undulatellum (Peck) Noordel. (2008)
- Entoloma undulatosporum Arnolds & Noordel. (1979)
- Entoloma unicolor (Peck) Hesler (1967)
- Entoloma unicoloratum (Largent & T.W. Henkel) Blanco-Dios (2016)
- Entoloma uranochroum Hauskn. & Noordel. (1999)
- Entoloma ursulae Noordel., Wölfel & Hauskn. (1995)
- Entoloma uvidicola Kokkonen (2021)

== V ==
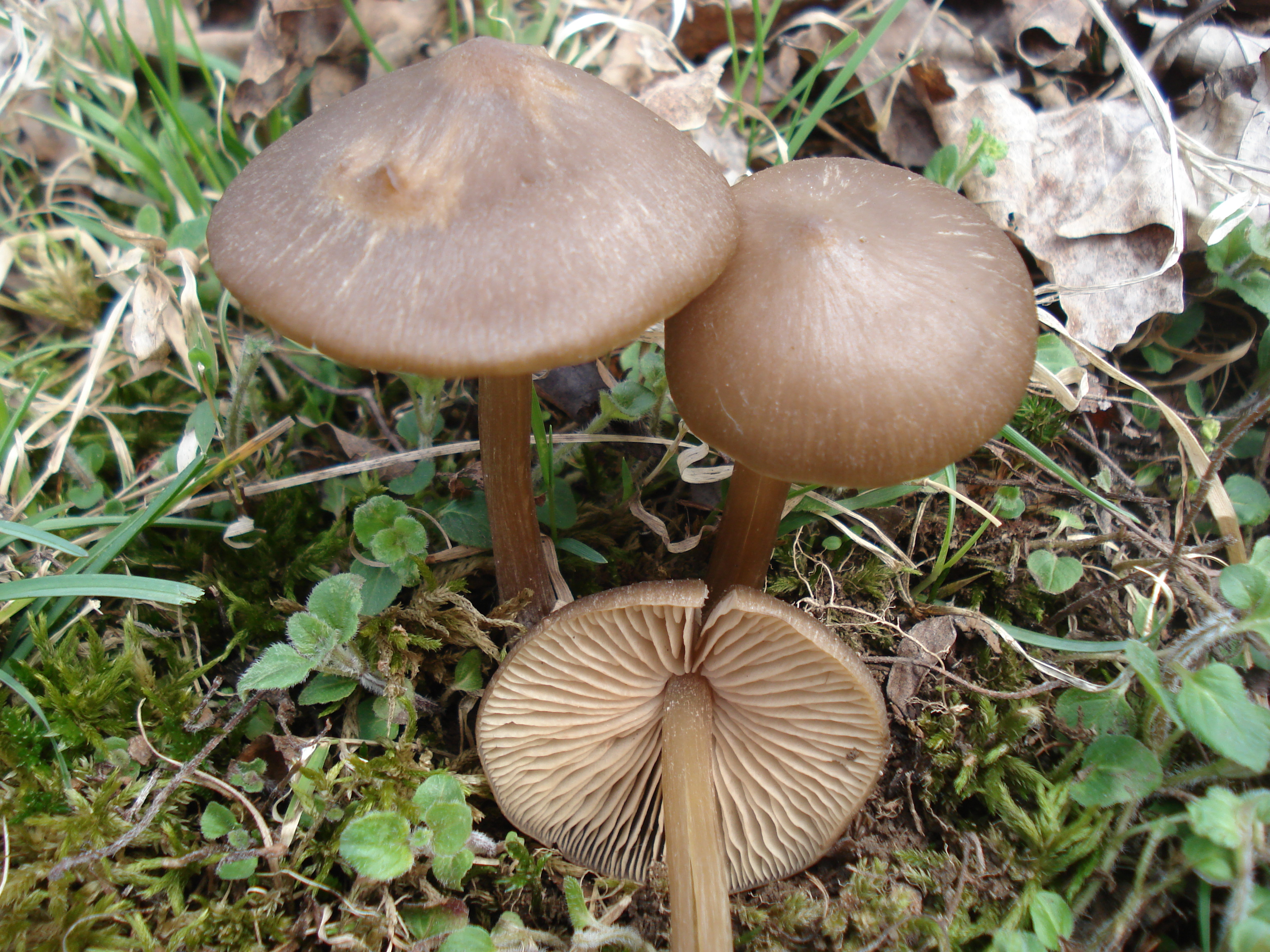
Entoloma vernum

- Entoloma valdeumbonatum Noordel. & Meusers (2004)
- Entoloma vallibacense J.M. Vidal (2016)
- Entoloma vallicutis (Pegler) Courtec. (1984)
- Entoloma vanajum Manim., A.V. Joseph & Leelav. (1995)
- Entoloma variabile Peck (1902)
- Entoloma variabilisporum E. Ludw. (2007)
- Entoloma variegatum (Velen.) Blanco-Dios (2017)
- Entoloma variesporum (Romagn. & Gilles) Noordel. & Co-David (2009)
- Entoloma variisporum Tkalčec & Mešić (2016)
- Entoloma velatum Hesler (1967)
- Entoloma velenovskyi Noordel. (1979)
- Entoloma veluticeps Corner & E. Horak (1980)
- Entoloma velutinum Hesler (1967)
- Entoloma velutipileum (Romagn. & Gilles) Noordel. & Co-David (2009)
- Entoloma venezuelanum (Dennis) E. Horak (1978)
- Entoloma venosum Gillet (1876)
- Entoloma ventricosum Arnolds & Noordel. (1979)
- Entoloma venustum Wölfel & F. Hampe (2011)
- Entoloma verae O.V. Morozova, Noordel., Reschke, F. Salzmann & Dima (2021)
- Entoloma verecundum (Fr.) Noordel. (1980)
- Entoloma vernalis (Har. Takah. & Degawa) V. Papp & Dima (2015)
- Entoloma vernum S. Lundell (1937)
- Entoloma versatile (Gillet) M.M. Moser (1978)
- Entoloma versicolor P.-A. Moreau, Vila, Noordel. & Dima (2021)
- Entoloma versiforme Largent, T.W. Henkel, Aime & R.A. Koch (2019)
- Entoloma vesiculosocystidium Z.S. Bi (1985)
- Entoloma vespertilium (Berk.) Blanco-Dios (2015)
- Entoloma vestipes (Romagn. & Gilles) Noordel. & Co-David (2009)
- Entoloma vetulum (Romagn.) Noordel. & Co-David (2009)
- Entoloma vezzenaense Noordel. & Hauskn. (1998)
- Entoloma viaregale Noordel. (1984)
- Entoloma vibrantium E. Horak (1978)
- Entoloma viiduense Noordel. & Liiv (1992)
- Entoloma vilaboense Blanco-Dios (2020)
- Entoloma villosulum Corner & E. Horak (1980)
- Entoloma vinaceobrunneum Hesler (1967)
- Entoloma vinaceocontusum (T.J. Baroni) Esteve-Rav. & A. Ortega (2003)
- Entoloma vindobonense Noordel. & Hauskn. (2004)
- Entoloma vinosopunctum E. Horak (1980)
- Entoloma vinosulum (Romagn. & Gilles) Noordel. & Co-David (2009)
- Entoloma violaceobrunneum Hesler (1967)
- Entoloma violaceocoeruleum Noordel. & G.M. Gates (2012)
- Entoloma violaceonigrum (Largent) Noordel. & Co-David (2009)
- Entoloma violaceoparkensis Noordel. & Trichies (2004)
- Entoloma violaceopurpureum Noordel. & Hauskn. (2015)
- Entoloma violaceoserrulatum Noordel., Brandrud, Morozova & Dima (2021)
- Entoloma violaceostriatum Noordel. & Hauskn. (2007)
- Entoloma violaceotinctum Largent (2015)
- Entoloma violaceovernum Noordel. & Wölfel (1987)
- Entoloma violaceovillosum Manim. & Noordel. (2006)
- Entoloma violaceoviride Arnolds & Noordel. (2004)
- Entoloma violaceozonatum Noordel. & Liiv (1992)
- Entoloma violascens G.M. Gates & Noordel. (2009)
- Entoloma virescens (Sacc.) E. Horak ex Courtec. (1986)
- Entoloma virgale (Pegler) Courtec. (2006)
- Entoloma virginicum Hesler (1967)
- Entoloma viridans (Fr.) P. Karst. (1879)
- Entoloma viridiflavipes (Largent) Noordel. & Co-David (2009)
- Entoloma viridipallidum Hesler (1967)
- Entoloma viridipes (Rick) Blanco-Dios (2017)
- Entoloma viridiphyllum Hesler (1967)
- Entoloma viridomarginatum (Cleland) E. Horak (1980)
- Entoloma viridulum (Henn.) Blanco-Dios (2017)
- Entoloma viscaurantium E. Horak & Singer (1982)
- Entoloma vitellinum Singer ex E. Horak (1978)
- Entoloma vittalii Senthil., Kumaresan & S.K. Singh (2011)
- Entoloma vividum (Largent & Aime) Blanco-Dios (2015)
- Entoloma vulcanicum Noordel. & Hauskn. (2015)
- Entoloma vulgare Hesler (1967)
- Entoloma vulpinum (Rick) Blanco-Dios (2017)
- Entoloma vulsum E. Horak (1973)

== W ==
- Entoloma waikaremoana E. Horak (2008)
- Entoloma washingtonense Murrill (1917)
- Entoloma washingtonicum Blanco-Dios (2016)
- Entoloma watsonii (Peck) Noordel. (2008)
- Entoloma waverenii Dima, O.V. Morozova & Noordel. (2022)
- Entoloma wayanadense K.N.A. Raj & Manim. (2017)
- Entoloma weberi Murrill (1951)
- Entoloma wednae V. Coimbra & Wartchow (2013)
- Entoloma weholtii Noordel. (1987)
- Entoloma westii Murrill (1940)
- Entoloma westparkense Blanco-Dios (2017)
- Entoloma whiteae Murrill (1917)
- Entoloma williamii Blanco-Dios (2017)
- Entoloma williammurrillii Blanco-Dios (2017)
- Entoloma winterhoffii Wölfel & Noordel. (1997)
- Entoloma wynneae (Berk. & Broome) Sacc. (1887)

== X ==
- Entoloma xanthocaulon Arnolds & Noordel. (1979)
- Entoloma xanthochroum (P.D. Orton) Noordel. (1985)
- Entoloma xanthocnemis (Romagn. & Gilles) Noordel. & Co-David (2009)
- Entoloma xanthomyces Corner & E. Horak (1980)
- Entoloma xanthophaeum (Romagn. & Gilles) Noordel. & Co-David (2009)
- Entoloma xanthoserrulatum Noordel. & Vauras (2004)

== Y ==
- Entoloma yanacolor Barili, C.W. Barnes & Ordoñez (2018)
- Entoloma yatesii (Murrill) Blanco-Dios (2015)
- Entoloma yunnanense J.Z. Ying (1995)

== Z ==
- Entoloma zandbaiense (Henn. & E. Nyman) Blanco-Dios (2017)
- Entoloma zanthophyllum (Largent) Noordel. & Co-David (2009)
- Entoloma zhangmuense Ke Wang, T.Z. Wei & P. Hong (2024)
- Entoloma zonatum Hesler (1967)
- Entoloma zuccherellii (Noordel. & Hauskn.) Noordel. & Co-David (2009)
