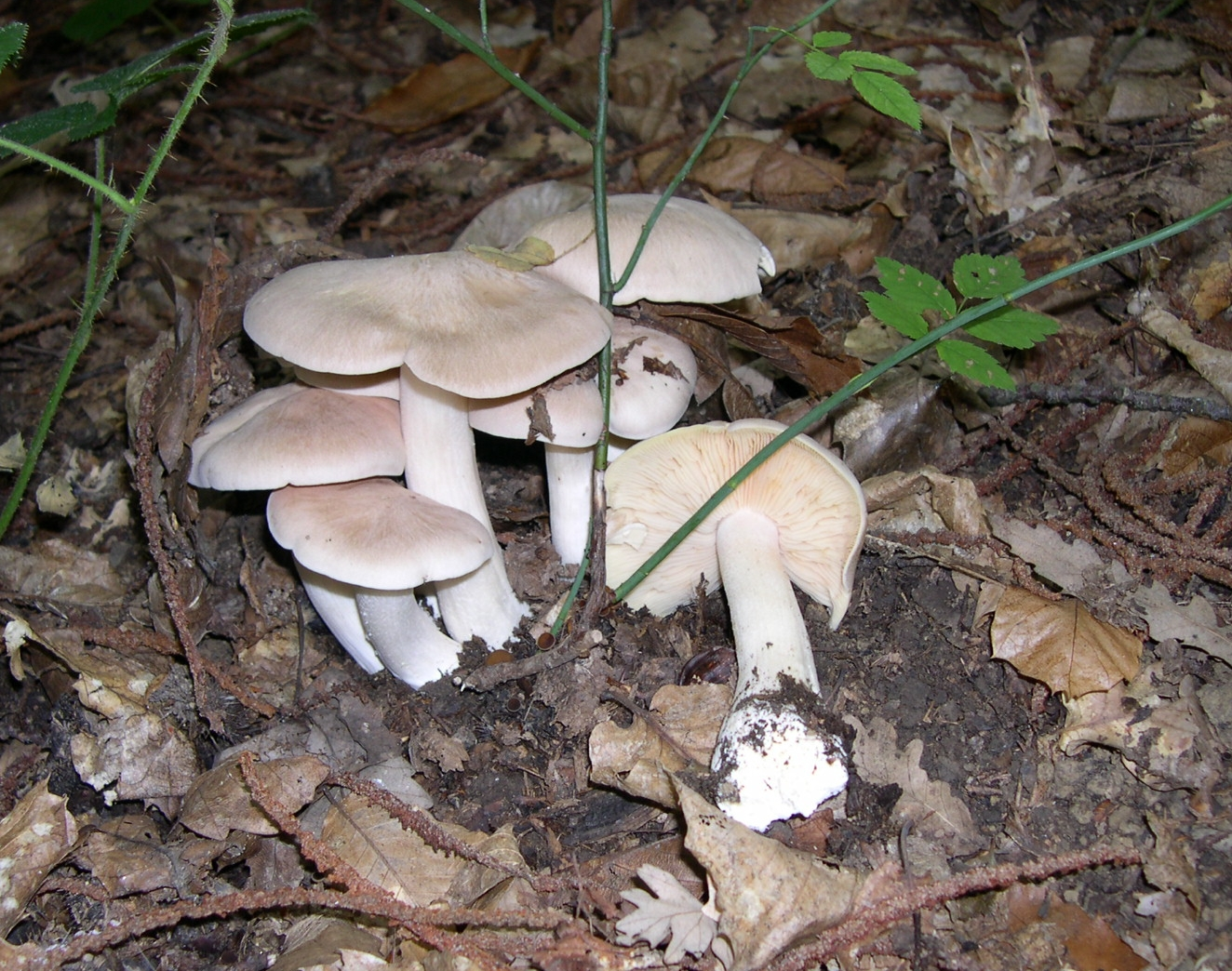
- E. sinuatum, Piacenza's Appennino, Italy

Scientific classification
- Kingdom: Fungi
- Division: Basidiomycota
- Class: Agaricomycetes
- Order: Agaricales
- Family: Entolomataceae
- Genus: Entoloma
- Species: E. sinuatum

Binomial name
- Entoloma sinuatum (Pers.) P.Kumm. (1871)

Synonyms
- Agaricus sinuatus Pers. (1801); Entoloma eulividum Noordel. (1985); Entoloma lividum (Bull.) Quél. (1872); Rhodophyllus lividus (Bull.) Quél. (1886); Rhodophyllus sinuatus (Bull.) Quél. (1888)

= Entoloma sinuatum =

Species of poisonous fungus

Entoloma sinuatum
- Mycological characteristics
- Gills on hymenium
- Cap is convex
- Hymenium is adnate
- Stipe is bare
- Spore print is pink
- Ecology is mycorrhizal
- Edibility is poisonous

Entoloma sinuatum (commonly known as the livid entoloma, livid agaric, livid pinkgill, leaden entoloma, and lead poisoner) is a poisonous mushroom found across Europe and North America. Some guidebooks refer to it by its older scientific names of Entoloma lividum or Rhodophyllus sinuatus. The largest mushroom of the genus of pink-spored fungi known as Entoloma, it is also the type species. Appearing in late summer and autumn, fruit bodies are found in deciduous woodlands on clay or chalky soils, or nearby parklands, sometimes in the form of fairy rings. Solid in shape, they resemble members of the genus Tricholoma. The ivory to light grey-brown cap is up to 20 cm (7.9 in) across with a margin that is rolled inward. The sinuate gills are pale and often yellowish, becoming pink as the spores develop. The thick whitish stem has no ring.

When young, it may be mistaken for the edible St George's mushroom (Calocybe gambosa) or the miller (Clitopilus prunulus). It has been responsible for many cases of mushroom poisoning in Europe. E. sinuatum causes primarily gastrointestinal problems that, though not generally life-threatening, have been described as highly unpleasant. Delirium and depression are uncommon sequelae. It is generally not considered to be lethal, although one source has reported deaths from the consumption of this mushroom.

== Name and relationships ==
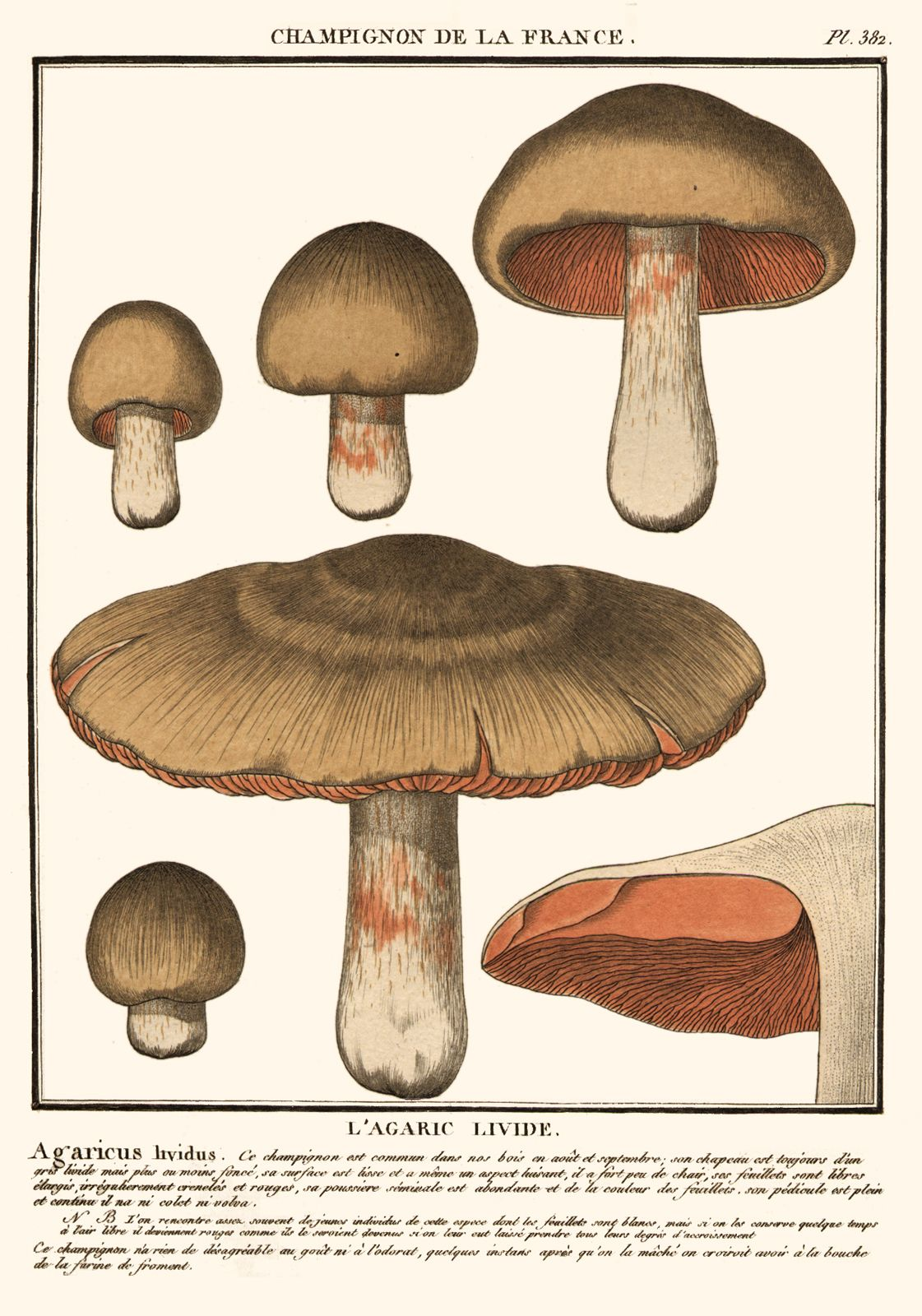
Bulliard's original illustration of Agaricus lividus from his 1788 Champignon de la France, which has been found to be a depiction of Pluteus cervinus.

The saga of this species' name begins in 1788 with the publication of part 8 of Jean Baptiste Bulliard's Herbier de la France. In it was plate 382, representing a mushroom which he called Agaricus lividus. In 1872, Lucien Quélet took up a species which he called "Entoloma lividus Bull."; although all subsequent agree that this is a fairly clear reference to Bulliard's name, Quélet gave a description that is generally considered to be that of a different species from Bulliard's. In the meantime, 1801 had seen the description of Agaricus sinuatus by Christian Persoon in his Synopsis Methodica Fungorum. He based that name on another plate (number 579) published in the last part of Bulliard's work, and which the latter had labelled "agaric sinué". (Note: Which means that under the modern principles of nomenclature, Persoon, not Bulliard, is the first to have used the name, since only names in Latin can be considered.) German mycologist Paul Kummer reclassified it as Entoloma sinuatum in 1871.

For many years Quélet's name and description were treated as valid because Bulliard's name antedated Persoon's. However, in 1950, a change in the International Code of Botanical Nomenclature (termed the Stockholm Code, after the city where the International Botanical Congress was being held) caused only names on fungi published after 1801 or 1821 (depending on their type) to be valid. This meant that suddenly Bulliard's name was no longer a valid name, and now it was Persoon's name that had priority. Nonetheless, it was a well-known name, and the already chaotic situation caused by a change to a famous Latin name was further complicated by another of Quélet's suggestions. He had in 1886 proposed a new, broader genus that included all pink-gilled fungi with adnate or sinuate gills and angular spores: Rhodophyllus. These two approach to genus placement, using either Rhodophyllus or Entoloma, coexisted for many decades, with mycologists and guidebooks following either; Henri Romagnesi, who studied the genus for over forty years, favoured Rhodophyllus, as initially did Rolf Singer. However, most other authorities have tended to favor Entoloma, and Singer conceded the name was far more widely used and adopted it for his Agaricales in Modern Taxonomy text in 1986.

In the meantime, it had been widely accepted that the 1950 change to the Stockholm Code caused more problems than they solved, and in 1981, the Sydney Code reinstated the validity of pre-1801 names, but created the status of sanctioned name for those used in the foundational works of Persoon and Elias Magnus Fries. Thus Entoloma sinuatum, which Fries had sanctioned, still had to be used for the species described by Quélet even though Bulliard's name was the older one. At about the same time, Machiel Noordeloos re-examined Bulliard's name in more details, and discovered that not only was it illegitimate (and thus not available for use) because William Hudson had already used it ten years earlier for a different species, but Bulliard's illustration was clearly not an Entoloma, but a species of Pluteus, (Note: It is now generally accepted the species in question is Pluteus cervinus.) a genus that is only distantly related to Entoloma. As this made Quélet's name definitely unusable for the Entoloma, and because at the time he and Romagnesi believed there were ground to treat Quélet's "E. lividum" and Persoon's E. sinuatum as separate species, he had to coin a third name for Quélet's species: Entoloma eulividum. He however later changed his mind on this issue, combining again his own Entoloma eulividum and E. sinuatum, so that Persoon's name is now universally recognised. Because it was previously widely used and Quélet had provided a good description and illustration (which, the proposer argued, was better considered as a new species rather than a mere placement of Bulliard's name in another genus), a proposal was made in 1999 to conserve Entoloma lividum and thus restore its use. However, it failed because E. sinuatum had already been in use (if not universally) for many years and was thus a well-known name for the species.

- - - - - - E. sinuatum
          - E. sp. 1 (Note: Initially presumed to be Entoloma prunuloides but later found to be distinct from that taxon.)
        - E. sordidulum
      - - E. politum
        - E. rhodopolium
    - E. caccabus
  - - E. sericatum
    - E. myrmecophilum

Cladogram showing the phylogenetic relationships of E. sinuatum and closely related fungi in the Rhodopolioid clade.

The specific epithet sinuatum is the Latin for "wavy", referring to the shape of the cap, while the generic name is derived from the Ancient Greek words entos/ἐντός "inner" and lóma/λῶμα "fringe" or "hem" from the inrolled margin. The specific epithet lividum was derived from the Latin word līvǐdus "lead-coloured". The various common names include livid entoloma, livid agaric, livid pinkgill, leaden entoloma, lead poisoner, and grey pinkgill. In the Dijon region of France it was known as le grand empoisonneur de la Côte-d'Or ("the great poisoner of Côte d'Or"). Quélet himself, who was poisoned by the fungus, called it the miller's purge, akin to another common name of false miller.

Within the large genus Entoloma, which contains more than 1900 species, E. sinuatum has been classically placed in the section Entoloma within the subgenus Entoloma, as it is the type species of the genus. A 2009 study analyzing DNA sequences and spore morphology found it to lie in a rhodopolioid clade with (among other species) E. sordidulum, E. politum and E. rhodopolium, and most closely related to E. sp. 1. This rhodopolioid clade lay within a crown Entoloma clade.

== Description ==
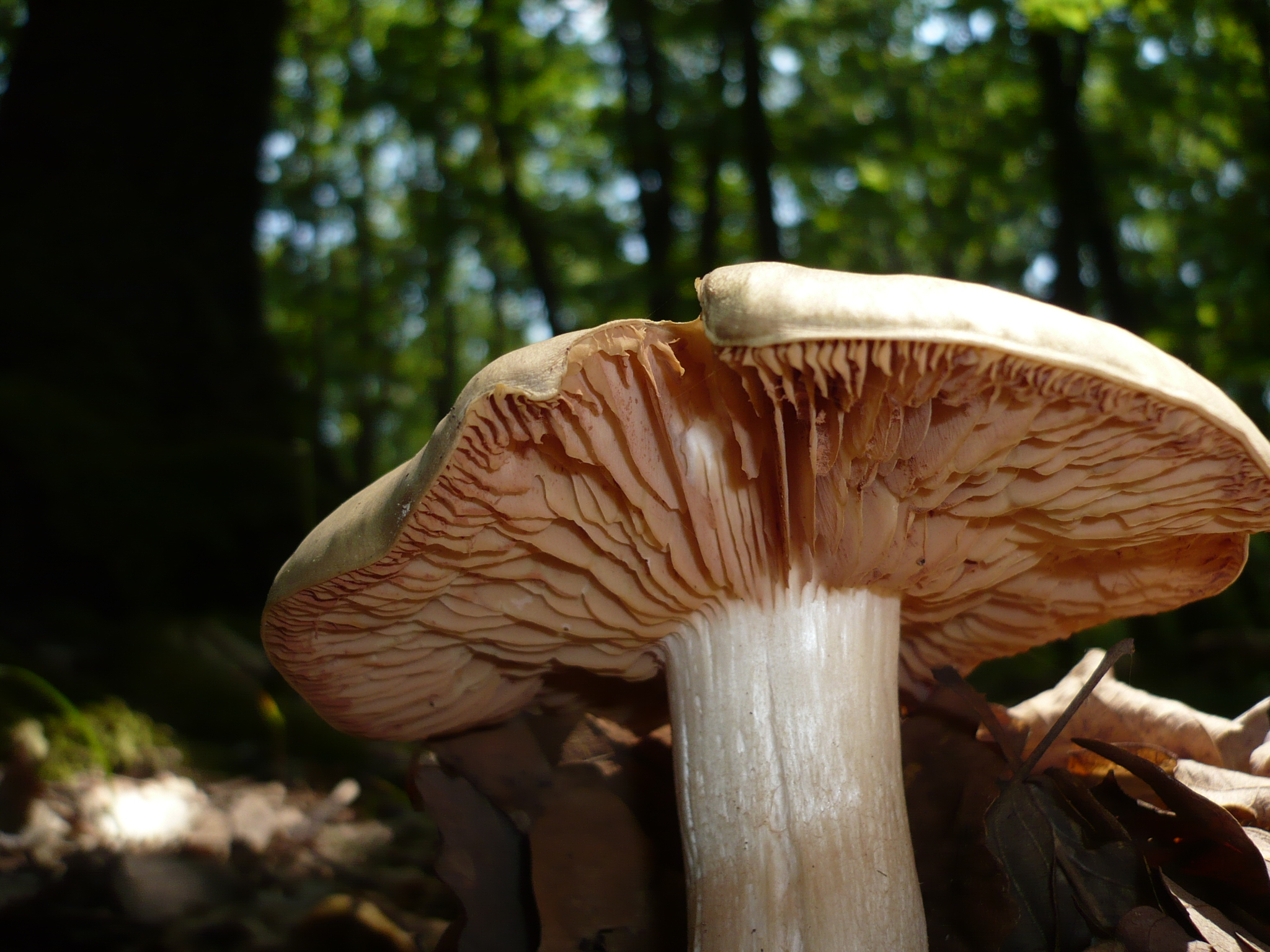
The gills of mature mushrooms darken to pink and then red.

The largest member of its genus, Entoloma sinuatum has an imposing epigeous (aboveground) fruiting body (basidiocarp), bearing a cap 6–20 cm (2 1/2–6 in) wide, though diameters of 30 cm (12 in) have been recorded. It is convex to flat, often with a blunt umbo in its centre and wavy margins, ivory white to light grey-brown in color, and darkening with age. The distant gills are sinuate (notched at their point of attachment to the stipe) to almost free, generally (but not always) yellowish white before darkening to pink and then red. Interspersed between the gills are lamellulae (short gills that do not extend completely from the cap margin to the stipe). When viewed from beneath, a characteristic groove colloquially known as a "moat" can be seen in the gill pattern circumnavigating the stalk. The form lacking yellow color on the gills is rare but widespread, and has been recorded from Austria, France and the Netherlands.

The stout white stipe lacks a ring and is anywhere from 4 to 20 cm (1.6 to 7.9 in) high, and 0.5–4 cm (0.20–1.57 in) in diameter. It may be bulbous at the base. The taste is mild, although it may be unpleasant. The mushroom's strong and unusual odor can be hard to describe; it may smell of flour, though is often unpleasant and rancid. The spore print is reddish-brown, with angular spores 8–11 × 7–9.5 μm, roughly six-sided and globular in shape. The basidia are four-spored and clamped. The gill edge is fertile, and cystidia are absent.

=== Similar species ===
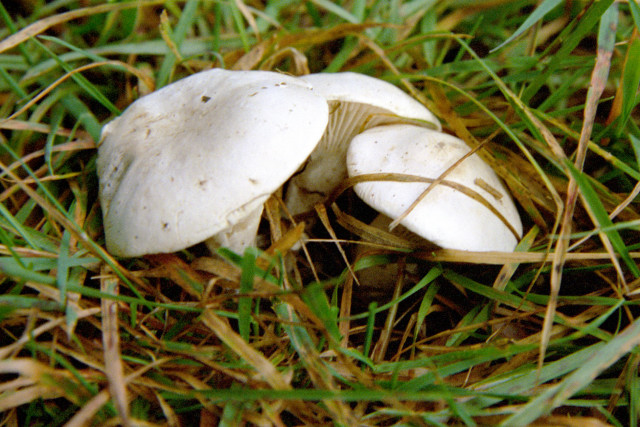
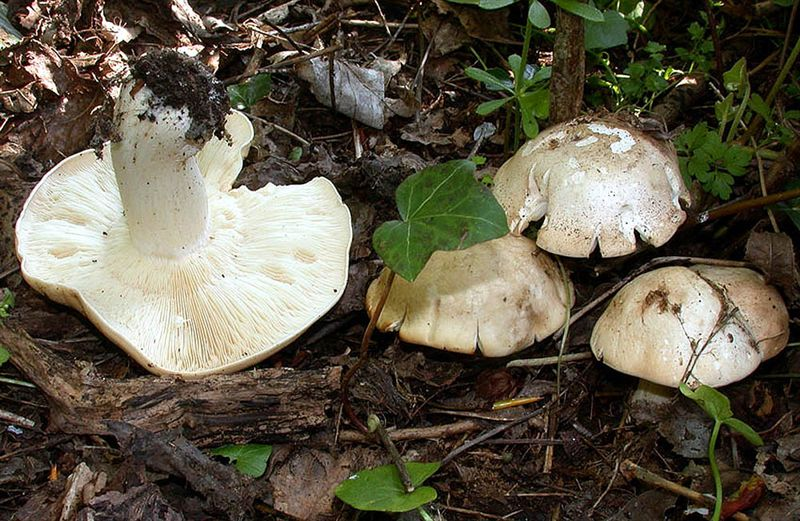
Lookalike species include Clitopilus prunulus (left) and Calocybe gambosa (right)

Confusion with the highly regarded miller or sweetbread mushroom (Clitopilus prunulus) is a common cause of poisoning in France; the latter fungus has a greyish -white downy cap and whitish decurrent gills which turn pink with maturity. Young fruit bodies of Entoloma sinuatum can also be confused with St George's mushroom (Calocybe gambosa), although the gills of the latter are crowded and cream in color, and the clouded agaric (Clitocybe nebularis), which has whitish decurrent gills and an unusual, starchy, rancid or rancid starch odor. To complicate matters, it often grows near these edible species. Its overall size and shape resemble members of the genus Tricholoma, although the spore color (white in Tricholoma, pinkish in Entoloma) and shape (angular in Entoloma) help distinguish it. The rare and edible all-white dovelike tricholoma (T. columbetta) has a satiny cap and stem and a faint, not mealy, odor. E. sinuatum may be confused with Clitocybe multiceps in the Pacific Northwest of North America, although the latter has white spores and generally grows in clumps. A casual observer may mistake it for an edible field mushroom (Agaricus campestris), but this species has a ring on the stipe, pink gills that become chocolate-brown in maturity, and a dark brown spore print. The poorly known North American species E. albidum resembles E. sinuatum but is likewise poisonous.

== Distribution and habitat ==
Entoloma sinuatum is fairly common and widespread across North America as far south as Arizona. It also occurs throughout Europe and including Ireland and Britain, though it is more common in southern and central parts of Europe than the northwest. In Asia, it has been recorded in the Black Sea region, the Adıyaman Province in Turkey, Iran, and northern Yunnan in China.

The fruit bodies of E. sinuatum grow solitarily or in groups, and have been found forming fairy rings. Fruit bodies appear mainly in autumn, and also in summer in North America, while in Europe the season is reported as late summer and autumn. They are found in deciduous woodlands under oak, beech, and less commonly birch, often on clay or calcareous (chalky) soils, but they may spread to in parks, fields and grassy areas nearby. Most members of the genus are saprotrophic, although this species has been recorded as forming an ectomycorrhizal relationship with willow (Salix).

== Toxicity ==
This fungus has been cited as being responsible for 10% of all mushroom poisonings in Europe. For example, 70 people required hospital treatment in Geneva alone in 1983, and the fungus accounted for 33 of 145 cases of mushroom poisoning in a five-year period at a single hospital in Parma. Poisoning is said to be mainly gastrointestinal in nature; symptoms of diarrhea, vomiting and headache occur 30 minutes to 2 hours after consumption and last for up to 48 hours. Acute liver toxicity and psychiatric symptoms like mood disturbance or delirium may occur. Rarely, symptoms of depression may last for months. At least one source reports there have been fatalities in adults and children. Hospital treatment of poisoning by this mushroom is usually supportive; antispasmodic medicines may lessen colicky abdominal cramps and activated charcoal may be administered early on to bind residual toxin. Intravenous fluids may be required if dehydration has been extensive, especially with children and the elderly. Metoclopramide may be used in cases of recurrent vomiting once gastric contents are emptied. The identity of the toxin(s) is unknown, but chemical analysis has established that there are alkaloids present in the mushroom.

A study of trace elements in mushrooms in the eastern Black Sea Region of Turkey found E. sinuatum to have the highest levels of copper (64.8 ± 5.9 μg/g dried material—insufficient to be toxic) and zinc (198 μg/g) recorded. Caps and stalks tested in an area with high levels of mercury in southeastern Poland showed it to bioaccumulate much higher levels of mercury than other fungi. The element was also found in high levels in the humus-rich substrate. Entoloma sinuatum also accumulates arsenic-containing compounds. Of the roughly 40 μg of arsenic present per gram of fresh mushroom tissue, about 8% was arsenite and the other 92% was arsenate.

== See also ==
- List of deadly fungi
- List of Entoloma species
