= Entoloma claviforme =

Scientific classification
- Kingdom: Fungi
- Division: Basidiomycota
- Class: Agaricomycetes
- Order: Agaricales
- Family: Entolomataceae
- Genus: Entoloma
- Subgenus: Nolanea
- Species: E. claviforme

Binomial name
- Entoloma claviforme (Largent & Aime) Blanco-Dios

Synonyms
- Nolanea claviformis Largent & Aime

Species of fungus

Entoloma claviforme, synonym Nolanea claviformis, is a mushroom in the family Entolomataceae. Described as new to science in 2014, it is found in Guyana, where it fruits on humus under Dicymbe corymbosa. The type was collected in the Potaro-Siparuni region, in the Pakaraima Mountains, at an elevation of 710–750 metres (2,330–2,460 ft). The specific epithet claviforme (club-shaped) refers to the shape of its stipe.

Although it was originally described under the genus name Nolanea, this is regarded as a sub-genus of Entoloma, and so the current name is Entoloma claviforme.
