= L. carnea =

L. carnea may refer to:

- Lambis carnea, a sea snail
- Leptonia carnea, a pink-spored mushroom
- Leucania carnea, an owlet moth
