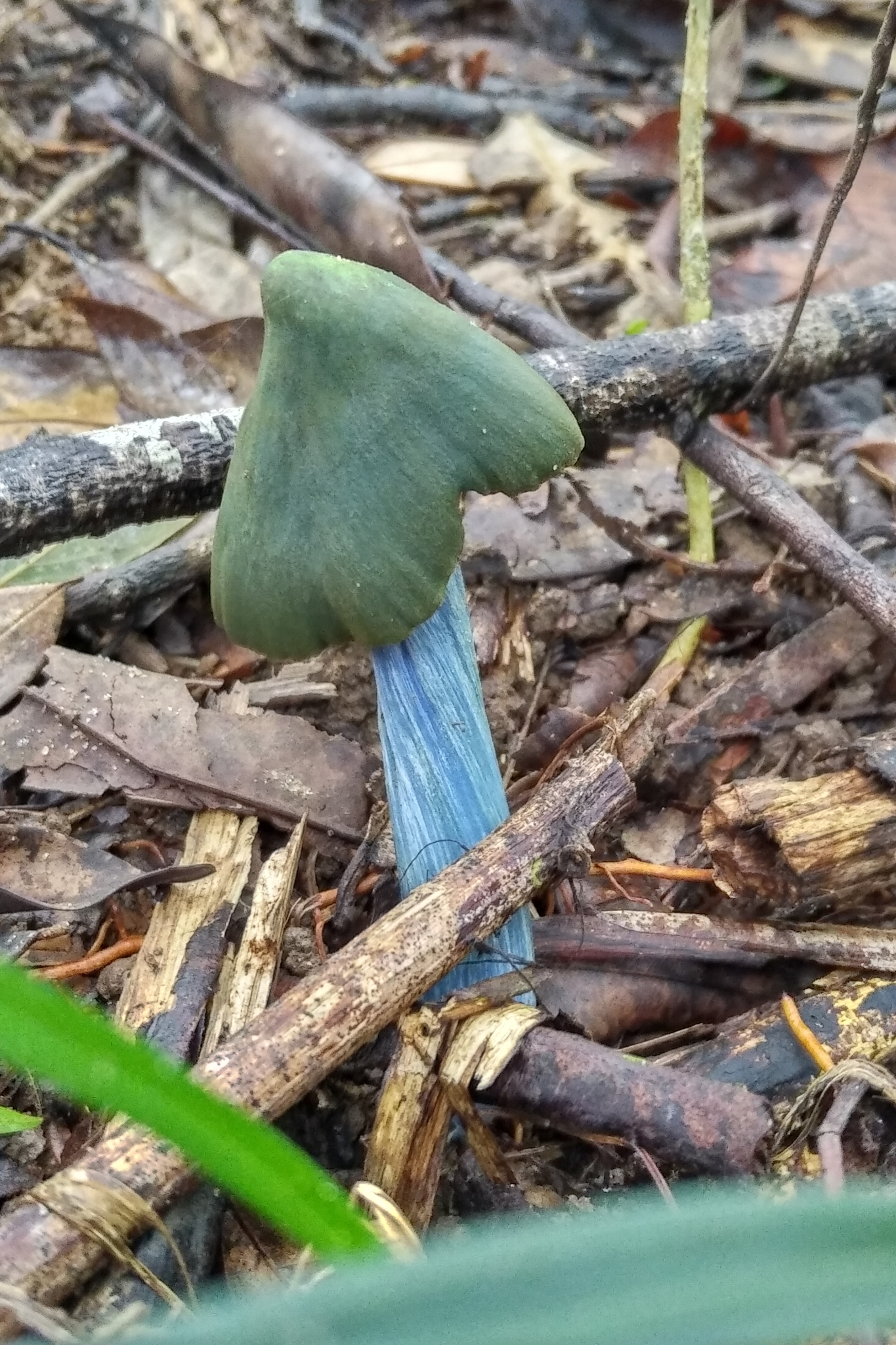

Scientific classification
- Kingdom: Fungi
- Division: Basidiomycota
- Class: Agaricomycetes
- Order: Agaricales
- Family: Entolomataceae
- Genus: Entoloma
- Species: E. azureoviride

Binomial name
- Entoloma azureoviride E. Horak & Singer
- Distribution Native range

= Entoloma azureoviride =

Fungi species

Entoloma azureoviride is a species in the genus Entoloma. It was originally described by Egon Horak in 1982.

== Description ==
Entoloma azureoviride has a conical or conico-convex cap, ranging from 24 to 38 mm in diameter. The cap can be deep blue or covered with ochre-green or olive-brown fibrils. The gills are deep blue, becoming vinaceous pink as the spores mature. The stem is cylindrical, deep blue, and often covered with fibrils. The spores are cuboid and slightly pinkish yellow-brown.

== Range & Habitat ==
Entoloma azureoviride exists in the Amazon basin and the Atlantic forest of southeast Brazil. Its habitat is characterized by the ground of a mature and stable tropical forest. The forest is of the type known as "terra-firme," which means it is not affected by seasonal flooding. The forest is located on plateaus and has clay-like soils. The forest floor has a thin layer of scattered leaves. Recent observation through crowdsourcing efforts confirm the range.
