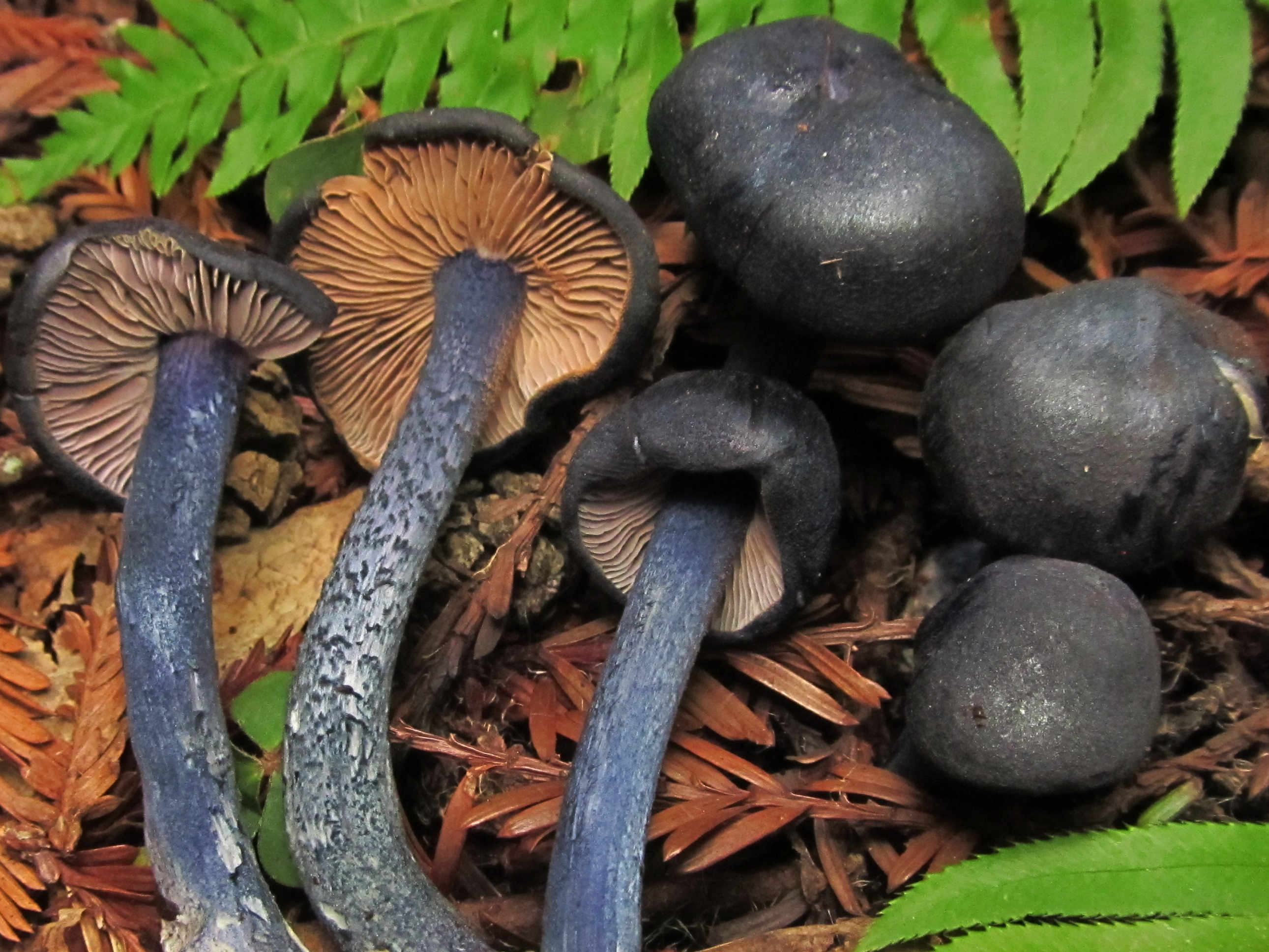

Conservation status
- Vulnerable (IUCN 3.1)

Scientific classification
- Kingdom: Fungi
- Division: Basidiomycota
- Class: Agaricomycetes
- Order: Agaricales
- Family: Entolomataceae
- Genus: Entoloma
- Subgenus: Entoloma subg. Leptonia
- Species: E. subcarneum

Binomial name
- Entoloma subcarneum (Largent) Blanco-Dios

Synonyms
- Leptonia carnea Largent

= Entoloma subcarneum =

Species of fungus

Entoloma subcarneum
- Mycological characteristics
- Gills on hymenium
- Cap is convex
- Hymenium is adnate or adnexed
- Stipe is bare
- Spore print is pink
- Edibility is unknown

Entoloma subcarneum (or Leptonia carnea), commonly known as the indigo leptonia, is a mushroom belonging to the subgenus Leptonia of the genus Entoloma.

The dark bluish cap is 2.5–7 cm (1.0–2.8 in) wide. The gills are lighter and leave a pinkish spore deposit. The bluish stalk is up to 10 cm (3.9 in) long and 1.5 cm (0.6 in) thick.

It known from California, perhaps exclusively, and is thus rare.
