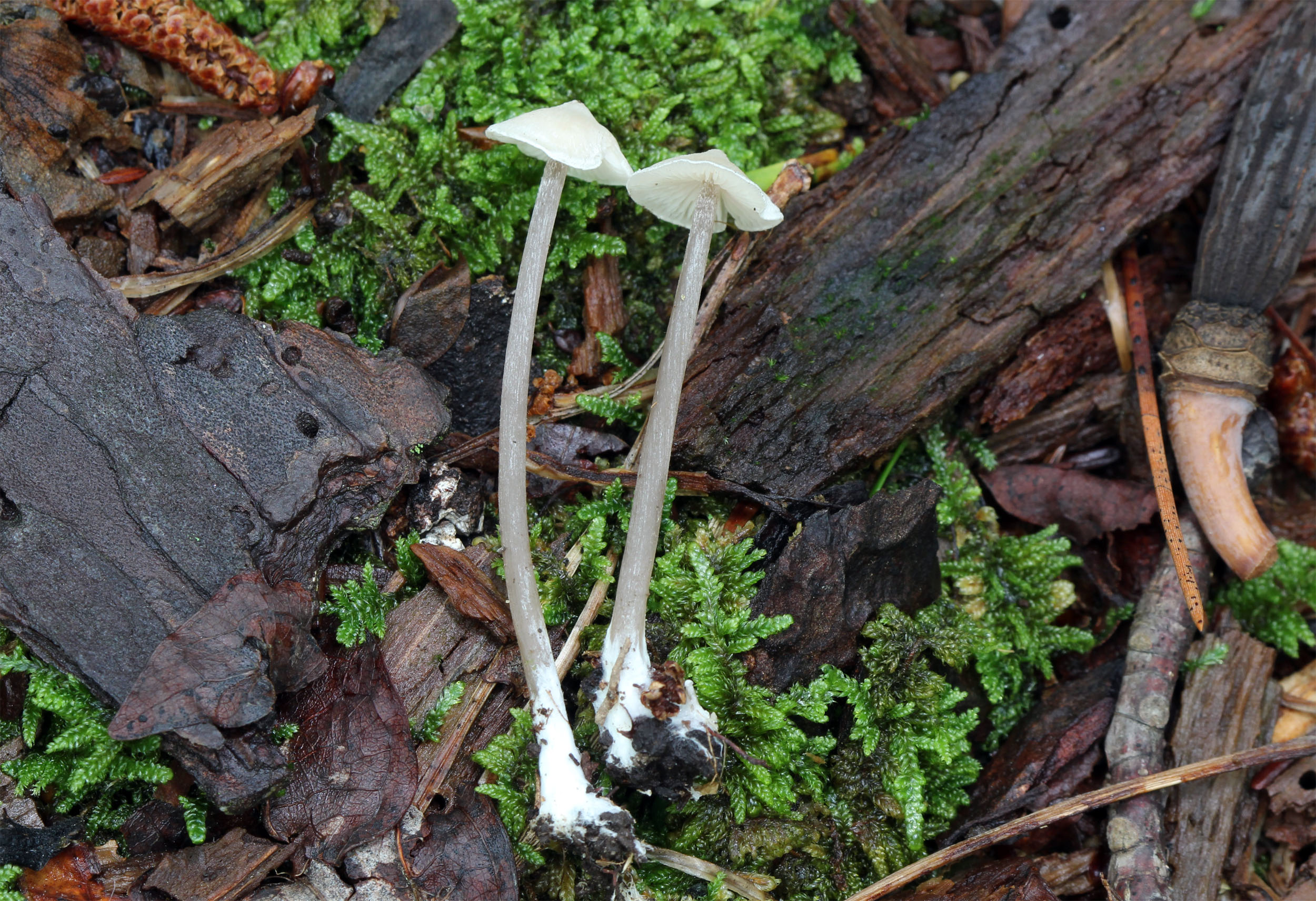

Scientific classification
- Kingdom: Fungi
- Division: Basidiomycota
- Class: Agaricomycetes
- Order: Agaricales
- Family: Entolomataceae
- Genus: Entoloma
- Species: E. alboumbonatum

Binomial name
- Entoloma alboumbonatum Hesler (1967)

= Entoloma alboumbonatum =

Species of fungus

Entoloma alboumbonatum is an inedible species of fungus in the agaric genus Entoloma. Found in the United States, it was described by mycologist Lexemuel Ray Hesler in 1967.

== See also ==
- List of Entoloma species
