= Entoloma flavostipitatum =

Scientific classification
- Kingdom: Fungi
- Division: Basidiomycota
- Class: Agaricomycetes
- Order: Agaricales
- Family: Entolomataceae
- Genus: Entoloma
- Species: E. flavostipitatum

Binomial name
- Entoloma flavostipitatum C.K. Pradeep & K.B. Vrinda (2016)

Entoloma flavostipitatum
- Mycological characteristics
- Gills on hymenium
- Cap is convex
- Hymenium is subdecurrent
- Stipe is bare
- Edibility is unknown

Entoloma flavostipitatum is a fungus in belonging to the broad genus Entoloma. The name "flavostipitatum" is constructed using Latin, with "flavo" meaning "yellow", it refers to the mushroom's yellow stipe. The sporocarp has a light brown cap, yellow subdecurrent gills, a smooth yellow stipe, and contains basidiospores with sizes ranging from 6.5 to 8.5 × 5.5–7.5 μm. Additionally, it contains yellowish-brown cystidia with sizes of range 30–44 × 6–8.5 μm. It was discovered in Kerala, India by researchers.

== See also ==
- List of Entoloma species
