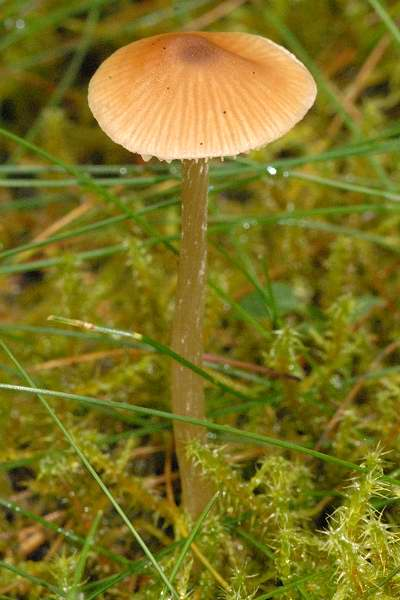

Scientific classification
- Kingdom: Fungi
- Division: Basidiomycota
- Class: Agaricomycetes
- Order: Agaricales
- Family: Entolomataceae
- Genus: Entoloma
- Species: E. cetratum

Binomial name
- Entoloma cetratum (Fr.) M.M. Moser 1978

= Entoloma cetratum =

Species of fungus

Entoloma cetratum is a common, inedible mushroom of the genus Entoloma. It is mostly found from May, in coniferous forest, among moss.

== Description ==
The cap is broadly conical to convex, light amber-brown, ribbed, and grows up to 3 cm in diameter. It is ribbed almost to the centre. The gills are salmon pink and sinuate. The spores are pink. The stem is light brown, longitudinally fibrous and slender.

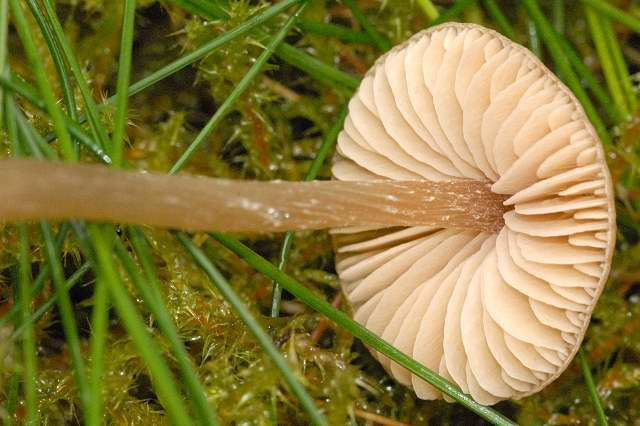
The underside of the mushroom

== See also ==
- List of Entoloma species
