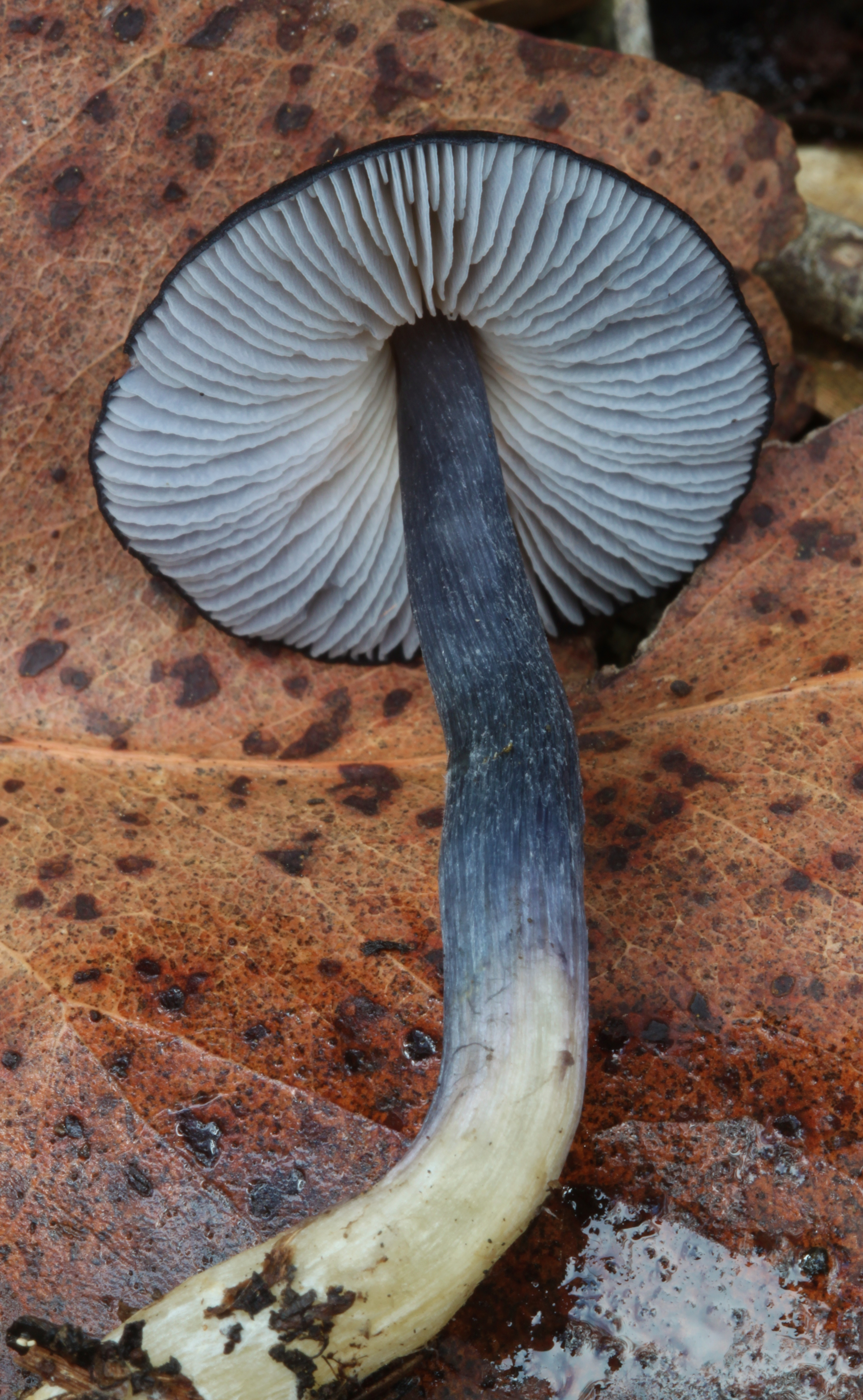

Scientific classification
- Kingdom: Fungi
- Division: Basidiomycota
- Class: Agaricomycetes
- Order: Agaricales
- Family: Entolomataceae
- Genus: Entoloma
- Species: E. moongum

Binomial name
- Entoloma moongum Grgur. (1997)

= Entoloma moongum =

Species of fungus

Entoloma moongum is a South Australian species of fungus in the large agaric genus Entoloma (subgenus Leptonia). It was described as new to science by mycologist Cheryl Grgurinovic; the original holotype collections were made from Belair National Park in the 1930s by John Burton Cleland, who erroneously referred the fungus to Leptonia lampropus (now Entoloma lampropus).

The fruitbody has a dark brown to purplish brown cap up to 19 mm (0.75 in) in diameter with a surface that is finely fibrillose, and a cap cuticle consisting of narrow hyphae. The spores measure 9.6–13.6 by 5.6–8.4 μm and have 5–6 blunt angles. Basidia (spore-bearing cells) are club-shaped, measuring 34.4–48.8 by 9.6–12.8 μm, with sterigmata up to 6 μm long. The specific epithet derives from the Aboriginal word moonga, meaning "dark".

== See also ==
- List of Entoloma species
