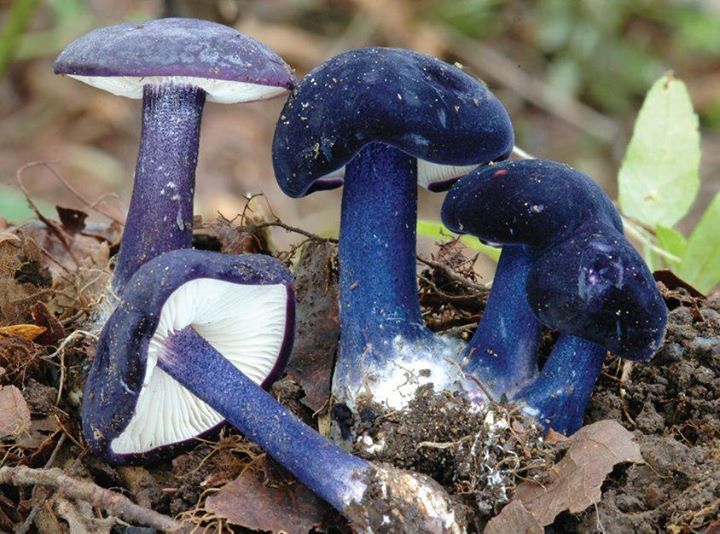
- Entoloma eugenei, Russia

Conservation status
- Endangered (IUCN 3.1)

Scientific classification
- Kingdom: Fungi
- Division: Basidiomycota
- Class: Agaricomycetes
- Order: Agaricales
- Family: Entolomataceae
- Genus: Entoloma
- Subgenus: Entoloma subg. Leptonia
- Species: E. eugenei

Binomial name
- Entoloma eugenei Noordel. & O.V. Morozova (2010)

= Entoloma eugenei =

Species of fungus

Entoloma eugenei is a species of agaric (gilled mushroom) in the family Entolomataceae. The species has a temperate distribution in the Russian Far East, Japan, and Korea, occurring mainly in mixed hardwood forests. Threats to its habitat have resulted in Entoloma eugenei being assessed as globally "endangered" on the IUCN Red List of Threatened Species.

== Taxonomy ==
The species was first described from the Russian Far East in 2010. Molecular research, based on cladistic analysis of DNA sequences, has shown that it belongs in the subgenus Leptonia.

== Description ==
Basidiocarps are agaricoid, up to 80 mm (3 in) tall, the cap hemispherical at first becoming flat, up to 60 mm (2.4 in) across. The cap surface is smooth, finely velvety when young, and deep blue. The lamellae (gills) are white becoming pink from the spores. The stipe (stem) is finely squamulose, cap-coloured or paler, lacking a ring. The spore print is pink, the spores (under a microscope) multi-angled, inamyloid, measuring about 10 to 12.5 by 6 to 8 μm.

=== Similar species ===
Entoloma dichroum is similar, but typically smaller and occurs in Europe.

== Distribution and habitat ==
Entoloma eugenei is rare and currently known from a very few sites in the Russian Far East and single sites in Japan and Korea. It occurs in mixed hardwood forests.

== Conservation ==
Because of its rarity and threats to its habitat through logging and deforestation, the species is of global conservation concern and is listed as "endangered" on the IUCN Red List of Threatened Species.
