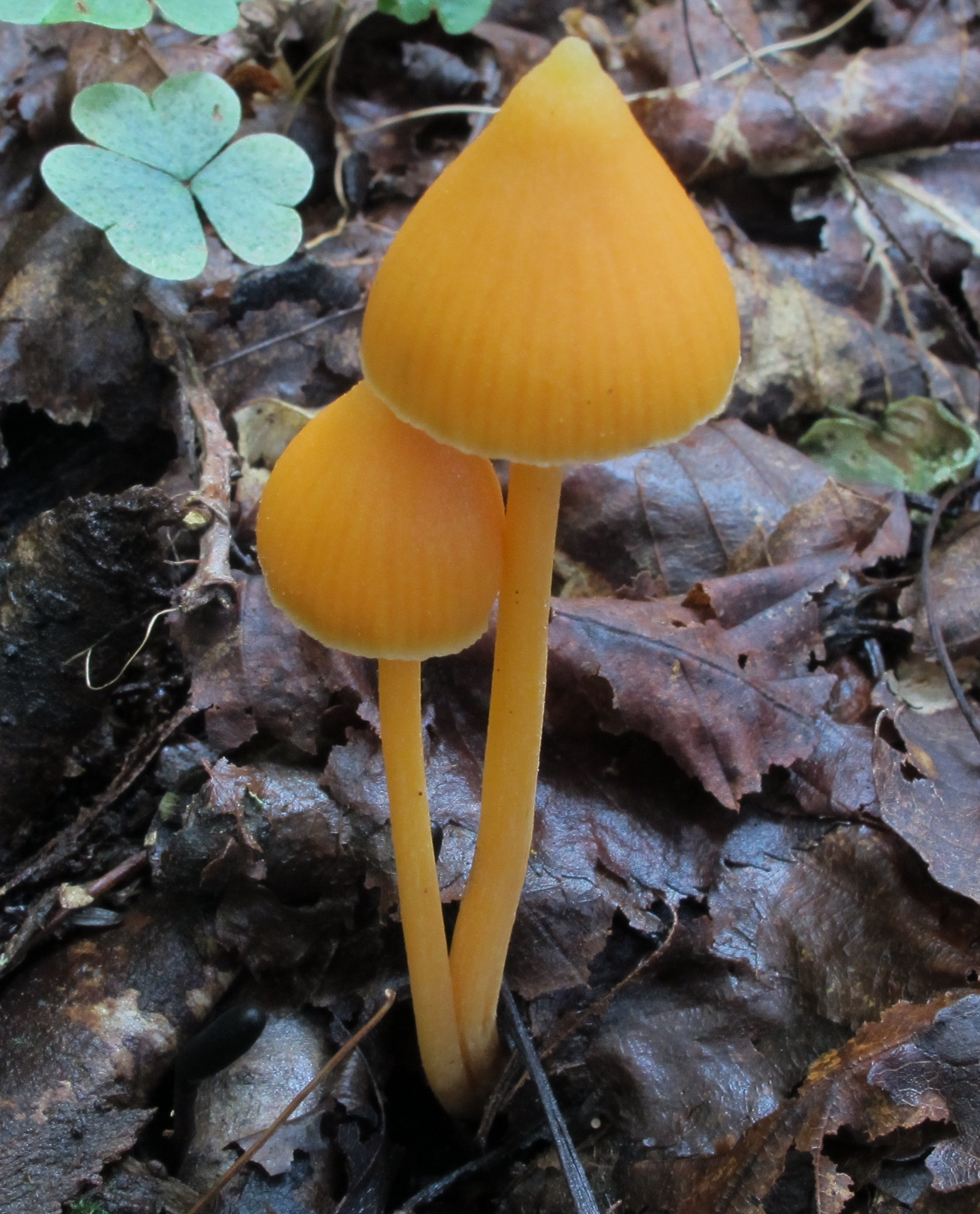

Scientific classification
- Kingdom: Fungi
- Division: Basidiomycota
- Class: Agaricomycetes
- Order: Agaricales
- Family: Entolomataceae
- Genus: Entoloma
- Species: E. quadratum

Binomial name
- Entoloma quadratum (Berk. & M.A.Curtis) E.Horak (1976)

Synonyms
- Agaricus quadratus Berk. & M.A.Curtis (1859); Nolanea quadrata (Berk. & M.A.Curtis) Sacc. (1887); Inocephalus quadratus (Berk. & M.A.Curtis) T.J.Baroni (2000)

= Entoloma quadratum =

Species of fungus

Entoloma quadratum is a species of agaric fungus in the family Entolomataceae. The fungus was originally described as Agaricus quadratus by Miles Joseph Berkeley and Moses Ashley Curtis in 1859; Egon Horak transferred it to Entoloma in 1976.

The mushroom is mostly orange. The cap grows up to 3.5 centimetres (1 1/2 in) wide and the stem reaches 10 cm (4 in) long. The spore print is pinkish-brown. It can resemble E. luteum, E. murrayi, and Hygrocybe conica.

It is found in Africa, Asia, Europe, and North America, under conifers and in moist soil.
