= Entoloma albidum =

Scientific classification
- Kingdom: Fungi
- Division: Basidiomycota
- Class: Agaricomycetes
- Order: Agaricales
- Family: Entolomataceae
- Genus: Entoloma
- Species: E. albidum

Binomial name
- Entoloma albidum Murrill (1917)

Synonyms
- Entoloma cinerascens Hesler (1967); Entoloma canum Hesler (1974)

Species of fungus

Entoloma albidum is a poisonous mushroom found in North America.

== See also ==
- List of Entoloma species
