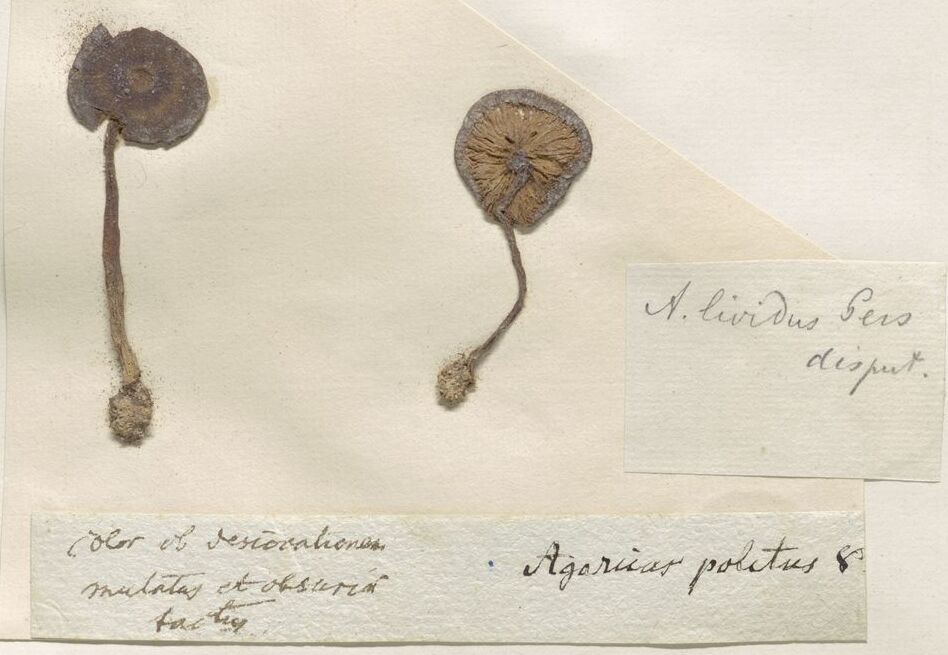

Scientific classification
- Kingdom: Fungi
- Division: Basidiomycota
- Class: Agaricomycetes
- Order: Agaricales
- Family: Entolomataceae
- Genus: Entoloma
- Species: E. politum

Binomial name
- Entoloma politum (Persoon) Donk

Synonyms
- 1794 Agaricus lividus Pers. 1801 Agaricus politus Pers. 1871 Eccilia polita (Pers.) P.Kumm. 1886 Rhodophyllus politus (Pers.) Quél. 1978 Rhodophyllus nitriolens Kühner; 1981 Entoloma nitriolens (Kühner) Trimbach

= Entoloma politum =

Species of fungus

Entoloma politum is a species of fungus in the Entolomataceae family. It is found in Europe and North America.

== See also ==
- List of Entoloma species
