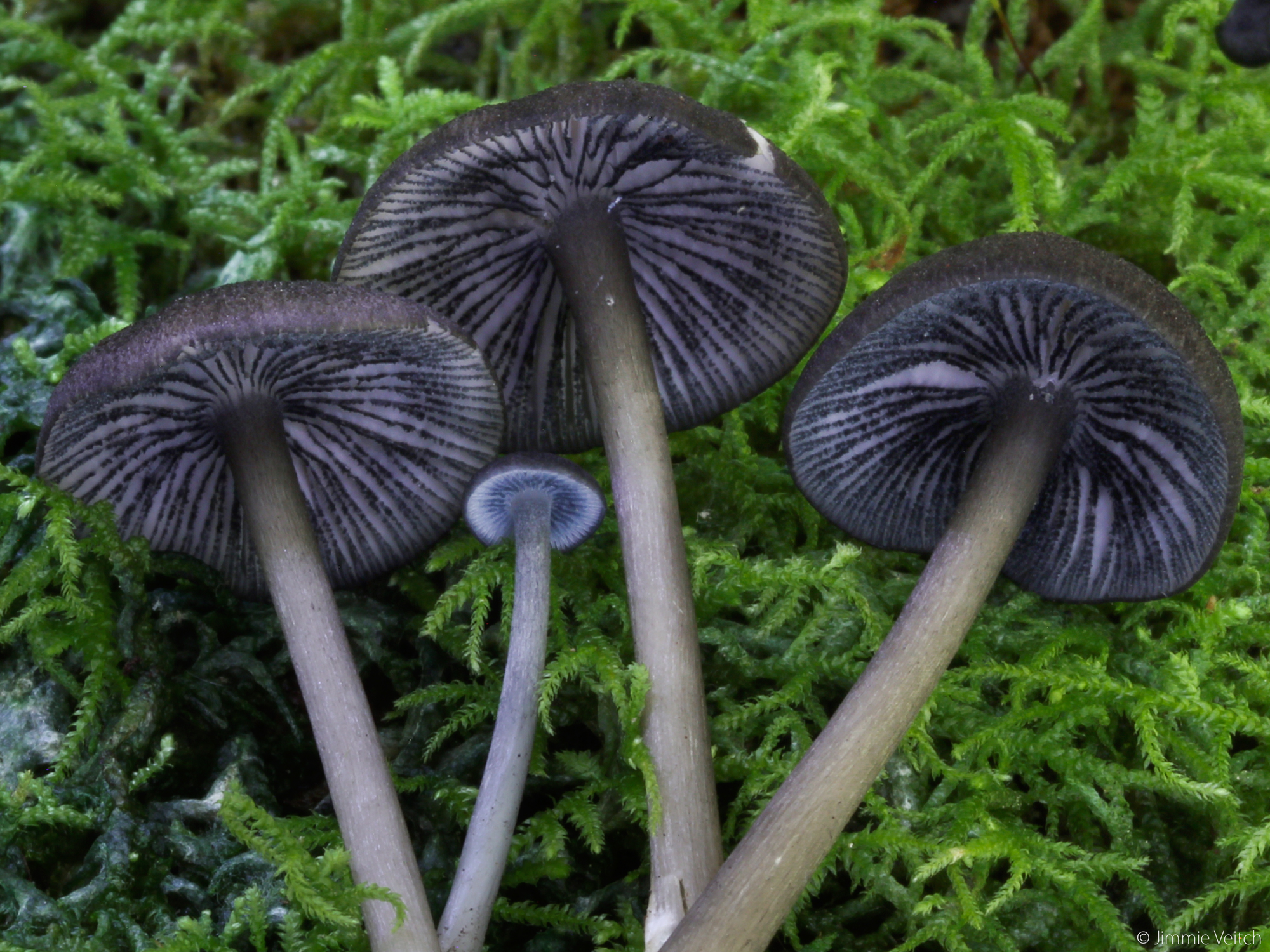

Scientific classification
- Kingdom: Fungi
- Division: Basidiomycota
- Class: Agaricomycetes
- Order: Agaricales
- Family: Entolomataceae
- Genus: Entoloma
- Species: E. serrulatum

Binomial name
- Entoloma serrulatum (Fr.) Hesler

Synonyms
- Leptonia serrulata (Fr.) P. Kumm.

= Entoloma serrulatum =

Species of fungus

Entoloma serrulatum
- Mycological characteristics
- Gills on hymenium
- Cap is convex or umbonate
- Hymenium is adnate or decurrent
- Stipe is bare
- Spore print is salmon
- Ecology is saprotrophic
- Edibility is unknown

Entoloma serrulatum is a species of mushroom in the family Entolomataceae. It is found across North America.

== Description ==
The cap of Entoloma serrulatum is dark blue in color and about 1.5-6 centimeters in diameter. It starts out broadly convex or dome-shaped and becomes flat or umbonate as the mushroom gets older. The umbo can have a depression in the center. The surface of the cap is somewhat tomentose. The gills are whitish to pinkish and adnate to decurrent. The stipe is hollow and the same color as the cap. It is bare near the base and silky near the top. The spore print is pinkish.

DNA analysis shows that Entoloma serrulatum may actually be multiple species, even in the Pacific Northwest alone.

== Habitat and ecology ==
Entoloma serrulatum is found in both grassy areas and forests. It is saprophytic.
