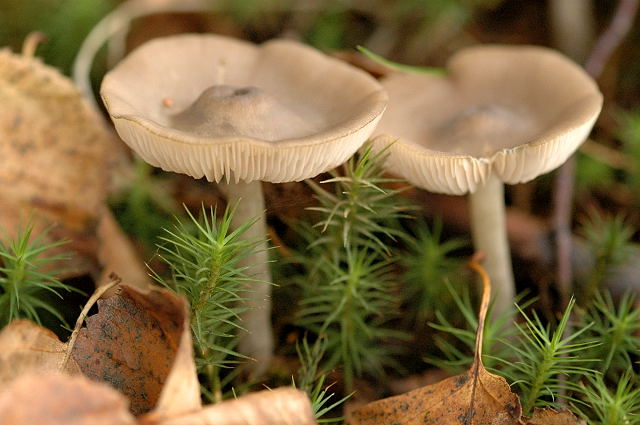

Scientific classification
- Kingdom: Fungi
- Division: Basidiomycota
- Class: Agaricomycetes
- Order: Agaricales
- Family: Entolomataceae
- Genus: Entoloma
- Species: E. sordidulum

Binomial name
- Entoloma sordidulum (Kühner & Romagn.) P.D.Orton

Synonyms
- Rhodophyllus sordidulus Kühner & Romagn. (1955)

= Entoloma sordidulum =

Species of fungus

Entoloma sordidulum is a mushroom found in North America. Rhodophyllus sordidulus is a synonym.

== See also ==
- List of Entoloma species
