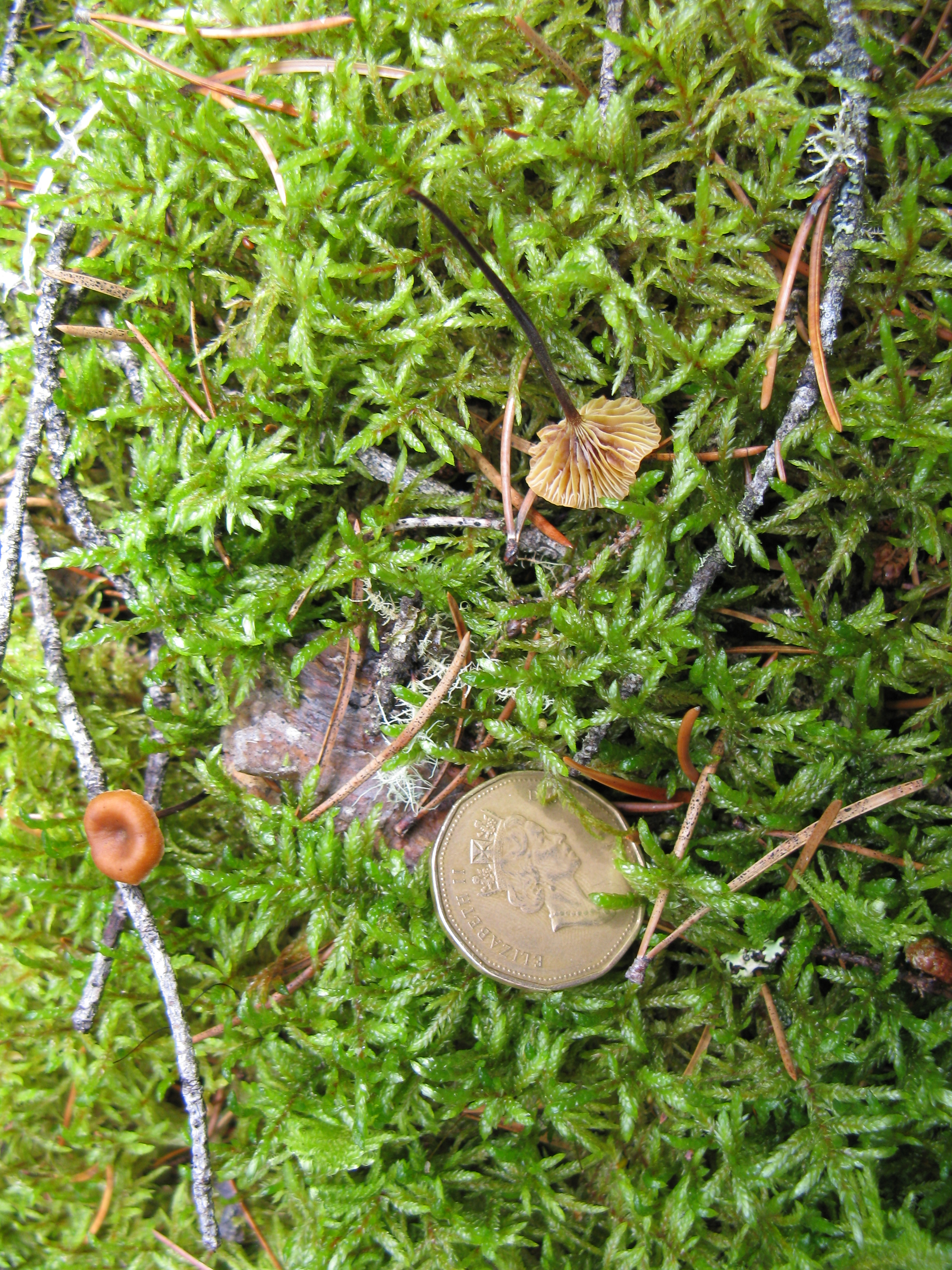
- Gill detail

Scientific classification
- Kingdom: Fungi
- Division: Basidiomycota
- Class: Agaricomycetes
- Order: Agaricales
- Family: Entolomataceae
- Genus: Entoloma
- Species: E. mammosum

Binomial name
- Entoloma mammosum (L.) Hesler (1967)

Synonyms
- Agaricus mammosus L. (1753); Nolanea mammosa (L.) Sacc. (1887); Rhodophyllus mammosus (L.) Quél. (1886); Latzinaea mammosa (L.) Kuntze (1898); Nolanea mammosa var. venezuelana Dennis (1961); Rhodophyllus venezuelanus (Dennis) Singer (1969)

= Entoloma mammosum =

Species of fungus

Entoloma mammosum, commonly known as the bell-shaped Nolanea, is a species of fungus in the family Entolomataceae. The fruit bodies are small and nippled, with a striate cap, salmon-colored gills, and a stately stalk. It is typically found growing in feather moss under spruce and Jack pine in the summer and fall. It is saprobic, and derives nutrients from rotting organic matter. The fungus was originally described by Carl Linnaeus in 1753 as Agaricus mammosus. American mycologist Lexemuel Ray Hesler transferred it to Entoloma in 1967.
