= Entoloma myrmecophilum =

Scientific classification
- Kingdom: Fungi
- Division: Basidiomycota
- Class: Agaricomycetes
- Order: Agaricales
- Family: Entolomataceae
- Genus: Entoloma
- Species: E. myrmecophilum

Binomial name
- Entoloma myrmecophilum (Romagn.) M.M. Moser

Synonyms
- Rhodophyllus myrmecophilus Romagn.

Species of fungus

Entoloma myrmecophilum is a species of fungus in the Entolomataceae family. It is found across Europe. It was described by Henri Romagnesi in 1978 as Rhodophyllus myrmecophilus, before being changed to its current name as the consensus has been to use the genus name Entoloma rather than Rhodophyllus.
