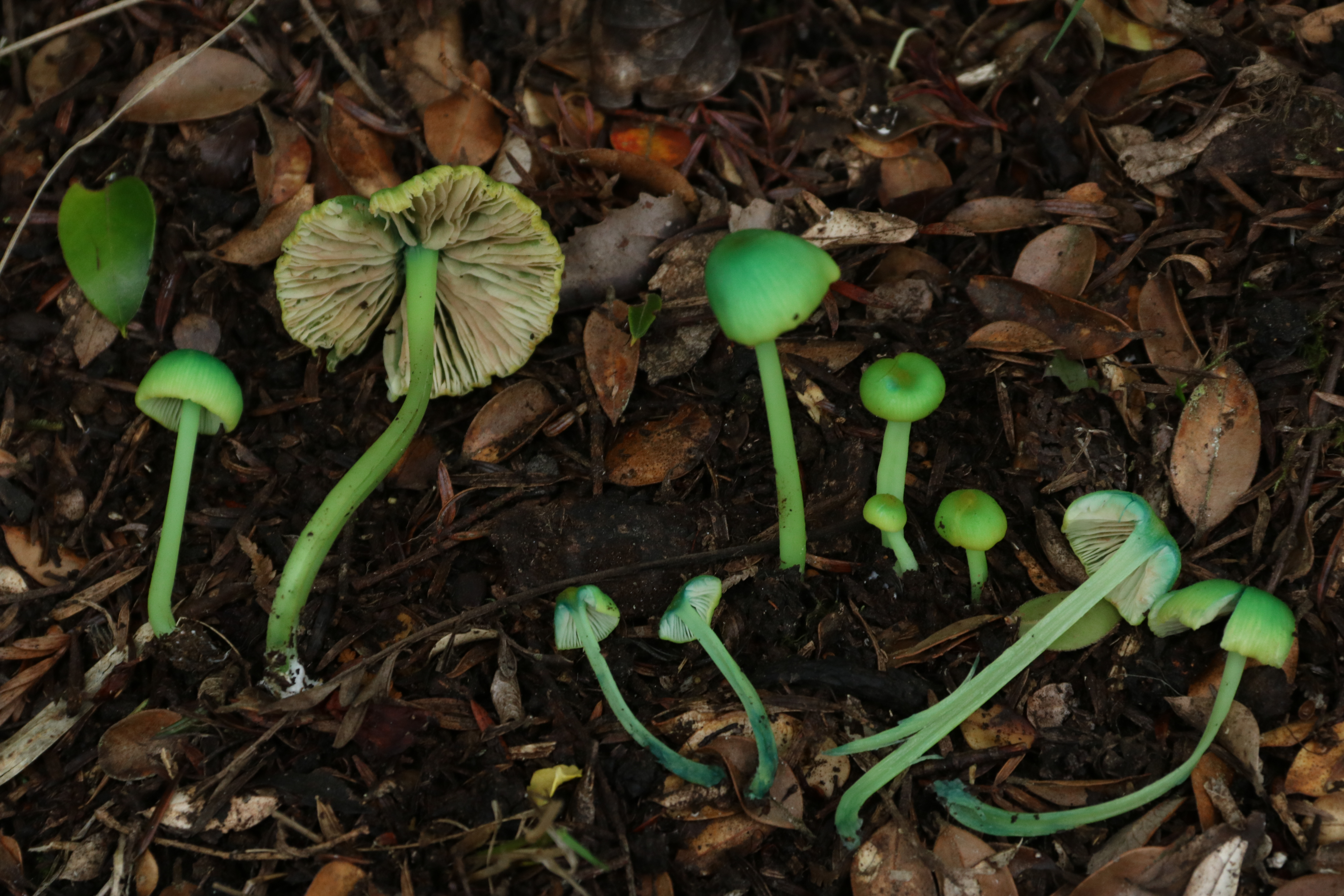
- Entoloma necopinatum, Chile

Conservation status
- Vulnerable (IUCN 3.1)

Scientific classification
- Kingdom: Fungi
- Division: Basidiomycota
- Class: Agaricomycetes
- Order: Agaricales
- Family: Entolomataceae
- Genus: Entoloma
- Species: E. necopinatum

Binomial name
- Entoloma necopinatum E. Horak (1978)

= Entoloma necopinatum =

Species of fungus

Entoloma necopinatum
- Mycological characteristics
- Gills on hymenium
- Cap is convex
- Hymenium is adnate
- Stipe is bare
- Spore print is salmon
- Ecology is saprotrophic
- Edibility is unknown

Entoloma necopinatum is a species of agaric (gilled mushroom) in the family Entolomataceae. The species is currently only known from Chile, occurring in Nothofagus (southern beech) forests. Threats to its habitat have resulted in Entoloma necopinatum being assessed as globally "vulnerable" on the IUCN Red List of Threatened Species.

== Description ==
Basidiocarps are deep green colored agaricoids, up to 60 mm (2.4 in) tall, the cap convex and umbilicate, up to 40 mm (1.5 in) across. The cap surface is smooth and dry. The lamellae (gills) are greenish becoming greenish pink from the spores. The stipe (stem) is smooth and cap-coloured, lacking a ring. Context is green. Odour and taste not distinctive.

The spore print is pink, the spores (under a microscope) multi-angled, inamyloid, measuring about 8.5 to 10 by 6 to 7 μm.

== Habitat and Conservation ==
Mushrooms grow in the soil, either alone or in groups. They are currently known in the Biobío and Aysén regions, Chile. It is commonly seen in the fall.

Because of its rarity and threats to its habitat, the species is of global conservation concern and is listed as "vulnerable" on the IUCN Red List of Threatened Species.
