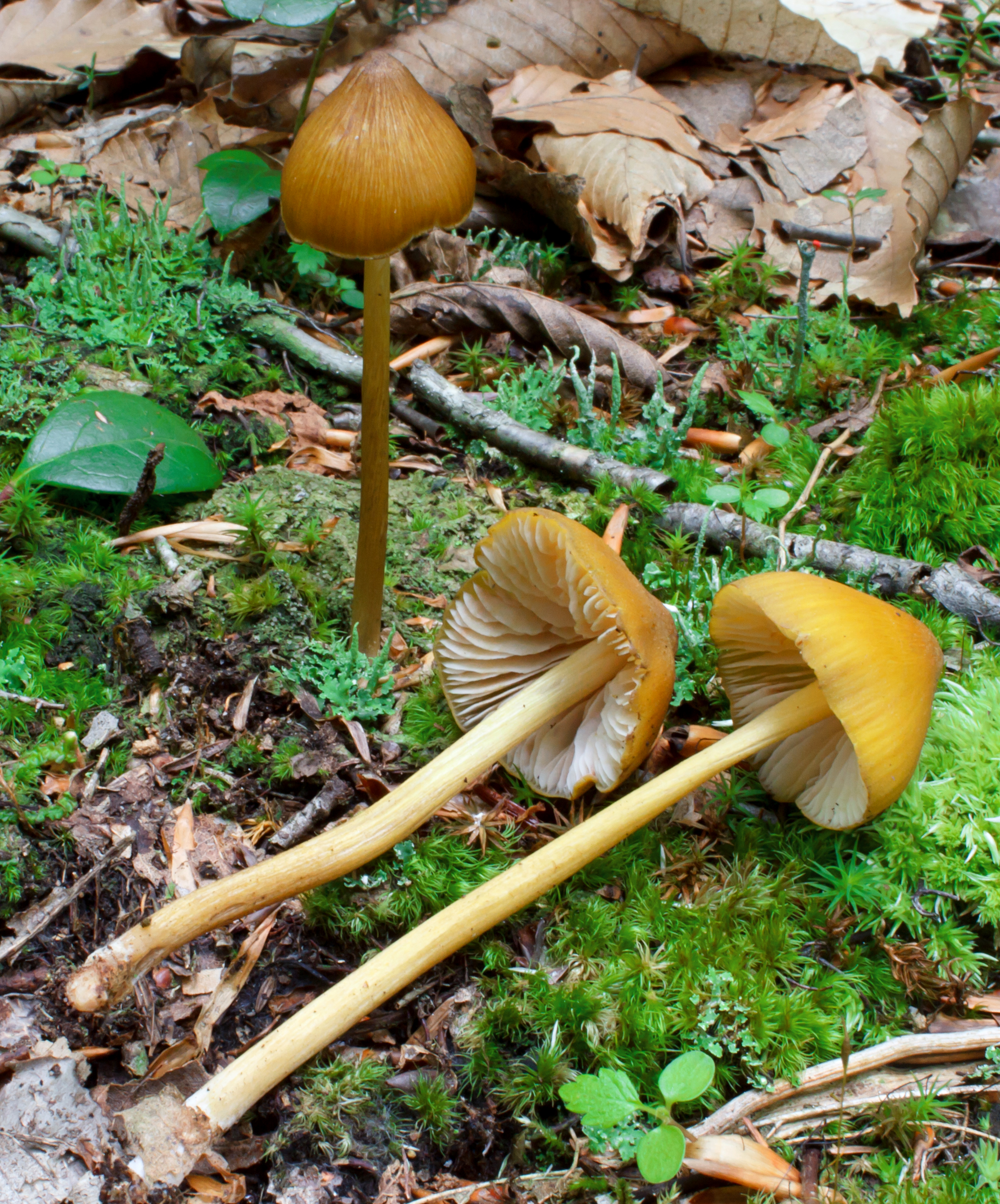

Scientific classification
- Kingdom: Fungi
- Division: Basidiomycota
- Class: Agaricomycetes
- Order: Agaricales
- Family: Entolomataceae
- Genus: Entoloma
- Species: E. luteum

Binomial name
- Entoloma luteum Peck (1902)

Synonyms
- Rhodophyllus luteus (Peck) A.H.Sm. (1953); Inocephalus luteus (Peck) T.J.Baroni (2000)

= Entoloma luteum =

Species of fungus

Entoloma luteum is a mushroom in the family Entolomataceae. It was described in 1902 by mycologist Charles Horton Peck. Found in North America, it fruits singly or in clusters on the ground in mixed forest. Its angular spores are non-amyloid, hyaline (translucent), and measure 9–13 by 8–12 μm. Entoloma murrayi is a lookalike species that has a more orange cap with a pointy umbo.

== See also ==
- List of Entoloma species
