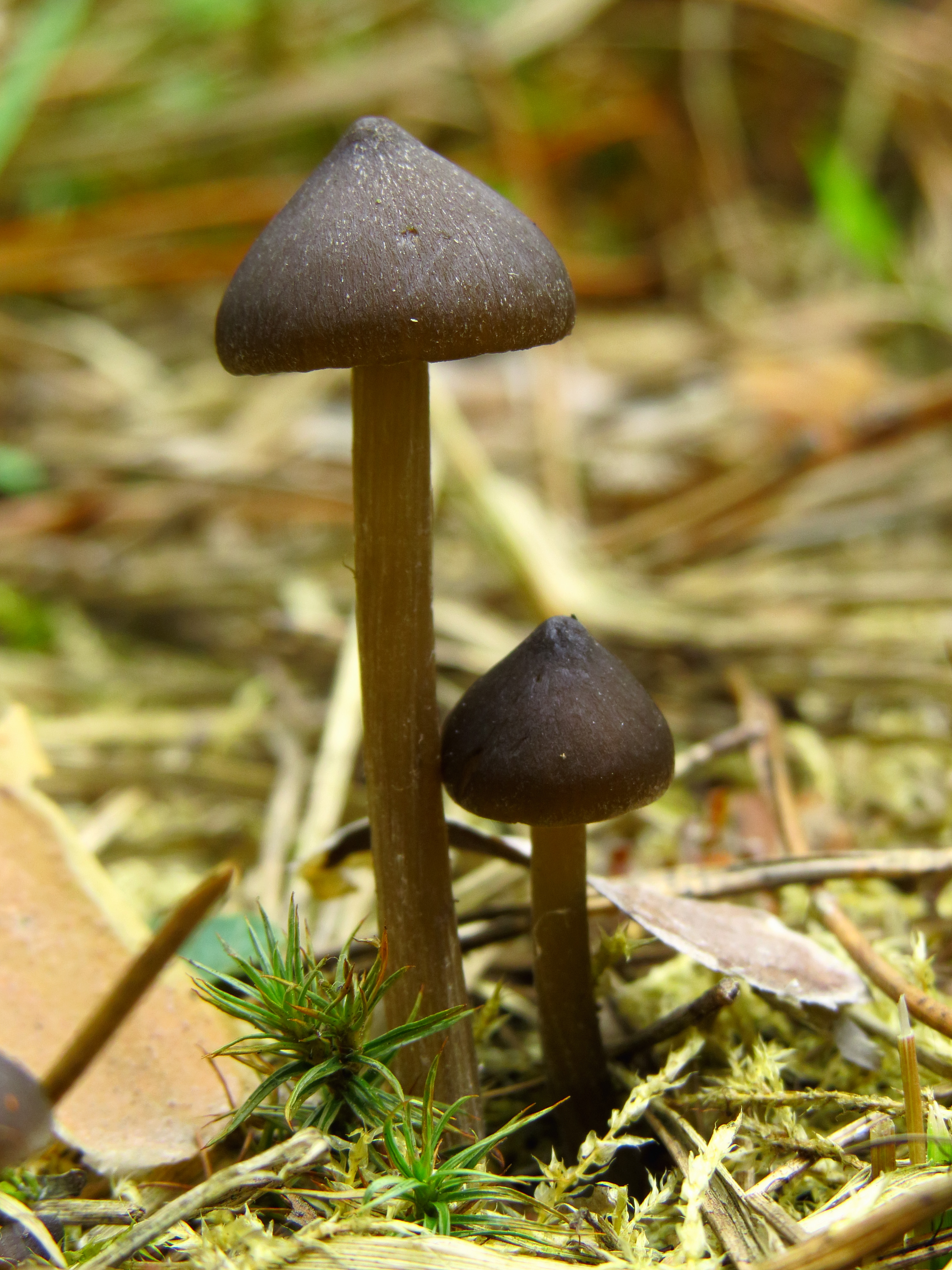
- Nolanea verna, Ukraine

Scientific classification
- Kingdom: Fungi
- Division: Basidiomycota
- Class: Agaricomycetes
- Order: Agaricales
- Family: Entolomataceae
- Genus: Entoloma
- Subgenus: Nolanea (Fr.) P.Kumm. (1871)

Type species
- Nolanea pascua (Pers.) P.Kumm. (1871)

Synonyms
- Agaricus trib. Nolanea Fr. (1821)

= Nolanea =

Genus of fungi

Nolanea is a subgenus of fungi in the genus Entoloma. Called pinkgills in English, basidiocarps (fruit bodies) are agaricoid, mostly mycenoid (like species of Mycena) with slender stems. All have salmon-pink basidiospores which colour the gills at maturity and are angular (polyhedral) under a microscope. Recent DNA evidence has shown that at least 87 species belong to the subgenus Nolanea which has a worldwide distribution.

== Taxonomy ==
The taxon Nolanea was introduced in 1821 by the Swedish mycologist Elias Magnus Fries as a "tribe" of Agaricus comprising slender agarics with bell-shaped caps, hollow stems, and pink spores. In 1871 German mycologist Paul Kummer raised the tribe to genus level. The name was used by many subsequent mycologists, but others have preferred to use the name Entoloma sensu lato for all fungi with pink, angular spores, retaining Nolanea as a subgenus.

Recent molecular research, based on cladistic analysis of DNA sequences, has shown that Nolanea, as previously defined, is paraphyletic (an artificial grouping). By excluding some species and adding others, however, Nolanea has been redefined as a monophyletic (natural) grouping. In this new sense, Nolanea has been treated either as a subgenus or as a separate genus.

The redefined Nolanea excludes Entoloma rhombisporum and related species, Entoloma ameides and related species, and cuboid-spored species now placed in Entoloma subgenus Cubospora.

An interesting taxonomic characteristic used to identify Nolanea fructufragaans Largent and Theirs is its distinctive odor. Sporocarp collected in coastal California redwood forest have a candy-store like or a “tooty-fruity” odor. Chemical analysis show anisole and 1,3-dimethoxybenzene as being responsible for this taxonomic characteristic of field collections.
