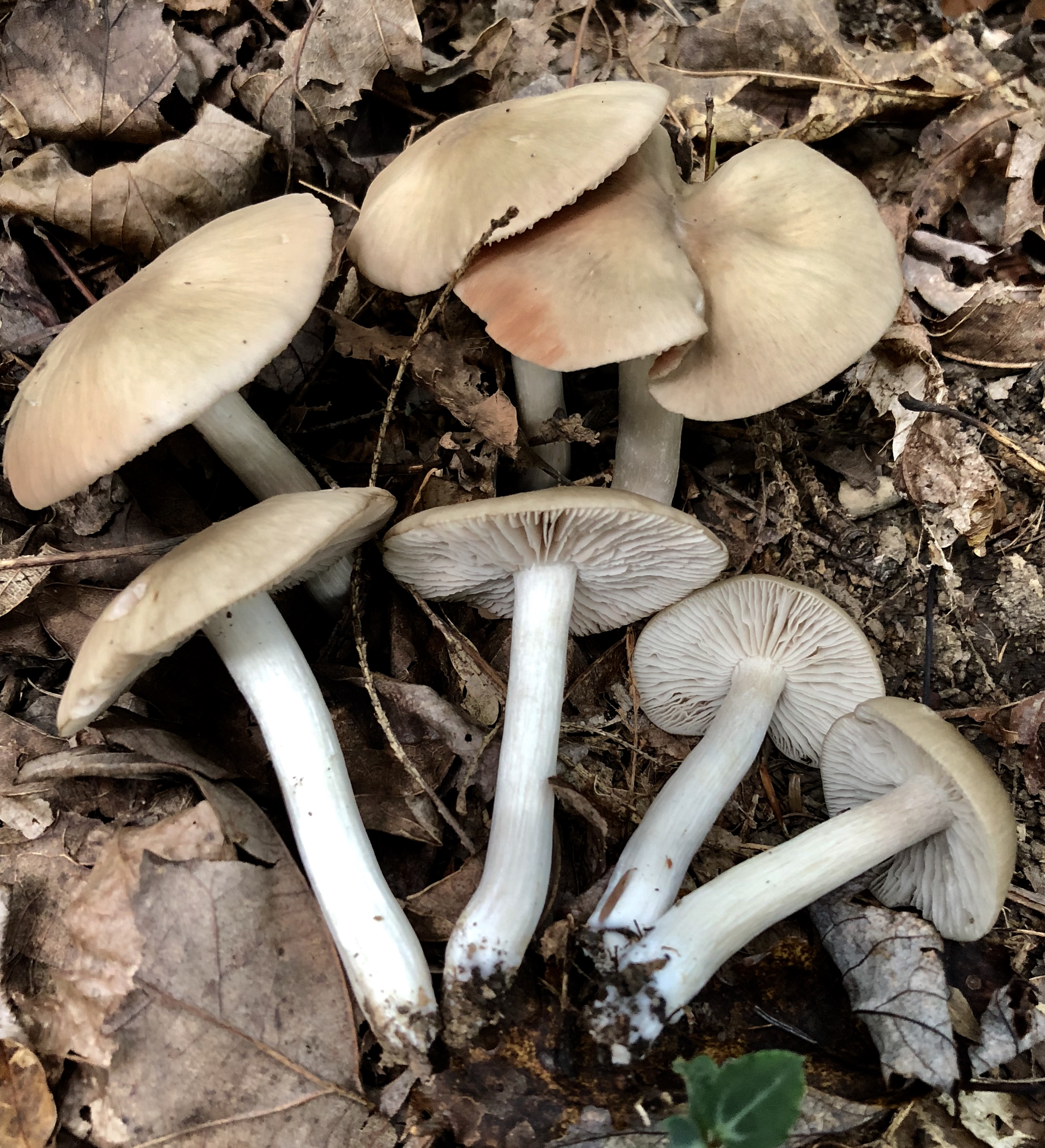

Scientific classification
- Kingdom: Fungi
- Division: Basidiomycota
- Class: Agaricomycetes
- Order: Agaricales
- Family: Entolomataceae
- Genus: Entoloma
- Species: E. rhodopolium

Binomial name
- Entoloma rhodopolium (Fr.) P. Kumm.

= Entoloma rhodopolium =

Entoloma rhodopolium
- Mycological characteristics
- Gills on hymenium
- Cap is convex
- Hymenium is adnate
- Stipe is bare
- Spore print is pink
- Ecology is mycorrhizal
- Edibility is poisonous

Entoloma rhodopolium, commonly known as the wood pinkgill, is a species of poisonous mushroom found in Eurasia and associated with specimens found in North America.

== Taxonomy ==
The taxonomy of this species is currently unclear, with forms identified in North America, which are not certainly the same species. An alternate scientific name seen is Rhodophyllus rhodopolius, from Lucien Quélet's broader genus containing a larger subsection of pink-spored fungi, encompassing Entoloma in general. Entoloma nidorosum, previously considered a separate species, is now classified as a variety of this fungus.

== Description ==
The gray to tannish cap is up to 20 centimetres (8 in) wide and convex to umbonate. The gills are lighter are release a pinkish spore deposit. The whitish stem is up to 13 cm long and 2 cm thick. The flesh is firm and white, perhaps with a farinaceous scent.

== Toxicity ==
The species is poisonous, causing serious gastrointestinal upset.

Often mistaken for the edible mushroom E. sarcopum, E. rhodopolium is one of the three most commonly implicated fungi in cases of mushroom poisoning in Japan. (The other two are Omphalotus japonicus and Tricholoma ustale.) Muscarine, muscaridine, and choline have been isolated as toxic agents.

== See also ==
- List of Entoloma species

== Gallery ==
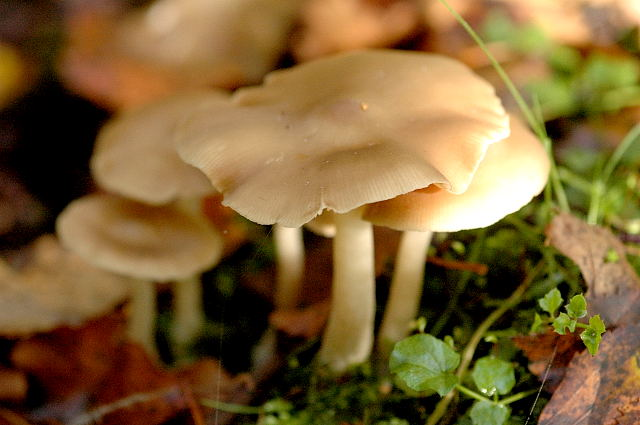
Group growing

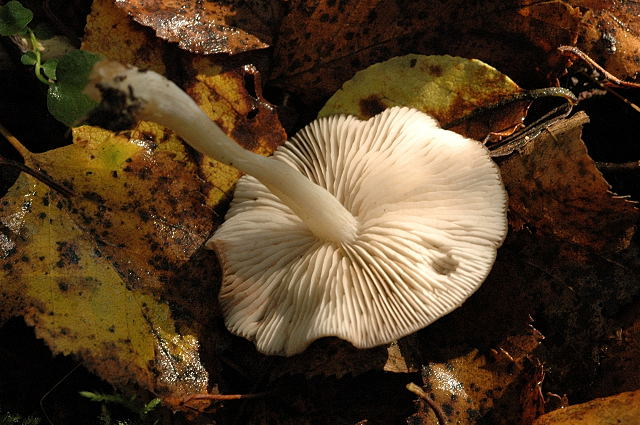
Cap underside
