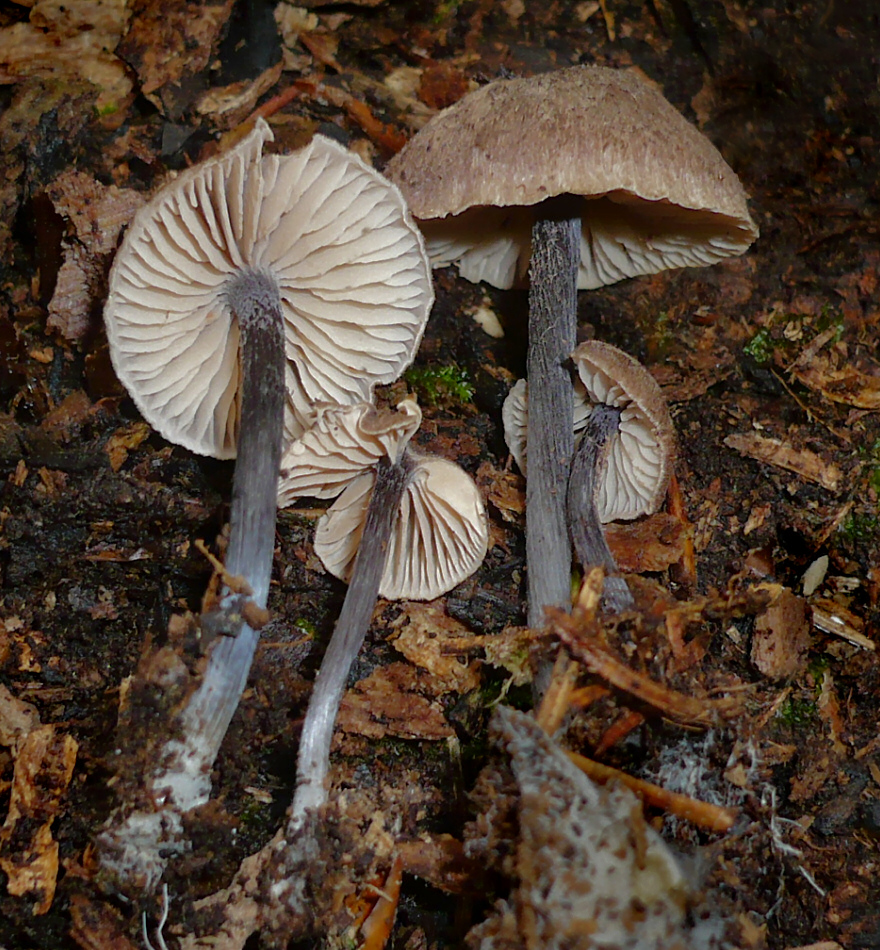
- Entoloma (Leptonia) dichroa, Czech Republic

Scientific classification
- Kingdom: Fungi
- Division: Basidiomycota
- Class: Agaricomycetes
- Order: Agaricales
- Family: Entolomataceae
- Genus: Entoloma
- Subgenus: Entoloma subg. Leptonia (Fr.) Noordel. (1981)

Type species
- Leptonia euchroa (Pers.) P.Kumm. (1871)

Synonyms
- Agaricus trib. Leptonia Fr. (1821); Leptonia (Fr.) P.Kumm. (1871)

= Entoloma subg. Leptonia =

Subgenus of fungi

Leptonia is a subgenus of fungi in the genus Entoloma. Called pinkgills in English, basidiocarps (fruit bodies) are agaricoid, mostly (but not always) mycenoid (like species of Mycena) with slender stems. All have salmon-pink basidiospores which colour the gills at maturity and are angular (polyhedral) under a microscope. Recent DNA evidence has shown that at least 12 species belong in Leptonia in temperate Europe and Asia.

== Taxonomy ==
Leptonia was introduced in 1821 by the Swedish mycologist Elias Magnus Fries as a "tribe" of Agaricus comprising small, slender agarics with convex to flat caps and pink spores. In 1871 German mycologist Paul Kummer raised the tribe to genus level.

Recent molecular research, based on cladistic analysis of DNA sequences, has shown that Leptonia, as previously defined, was paraphyletic (an artificial grouping). By excluding species unrelated to the type, however, Leptonia has been redefined as a monophyletic (natural) grouping. In this new sense, Leptonia has so far been treated as a subgenus of Entoloma.

The redefined Leptonia is substantially smaller than before and excludes Entoloma cyanulum, Entoloma serrulatum, and related species (now placed in subgenus Cyanula), Entoloma cocles and related species (now placed in subgenus Griseorubida), and Entoloma watsonii and related species (now placed in subgenus Rhamphocystotae).
