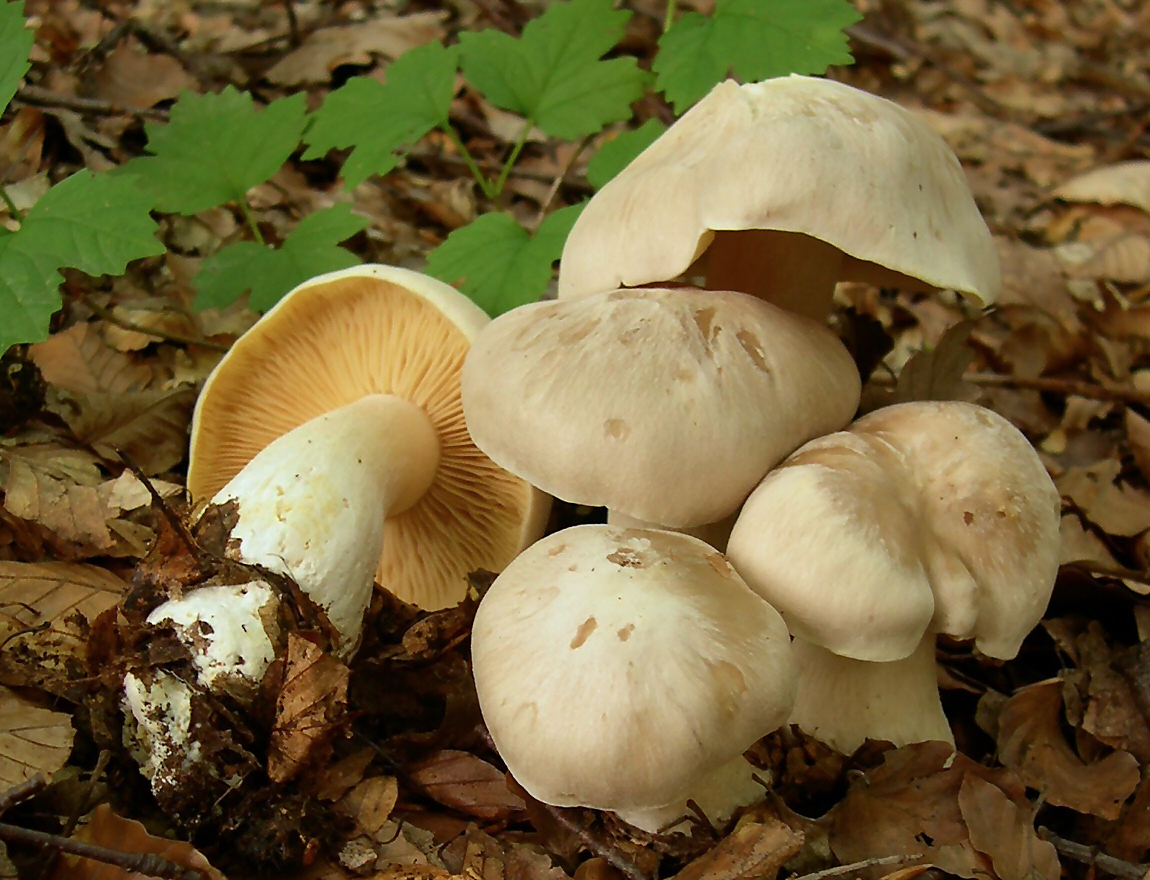
- Entoloma sinuatum

Scientific classification
- Kingdom: Fungi
- Division: Basidiomycota
- Class: Agaricomycetes
- Order: Agaricales
- Family: Entolomataceae
- Genus: Entoloma (Fr.) P.Kumm. (1871)

Type species
- Entoloma sinuatum (Bull.) P.Kumm. (1871)

Species
- 2031 species

Synonyms
- List: Agaricus trib. Entoloma Fr. (1838); Alboleptonia Largent & R.G.Benedict (1970); Arenicola Velen. (1947); Calliderma (Romagn.) Largent (1994); Claudopus Gillet (1876); Clitopiloides (Romagn.) Largent (1994); Eccilia (Fr.) P.Kumm. (1871); Fibropilus (Noordel.) Largent (1994); Inocephalus (Noordel.) P.D.Orton (1991); Leptonia (Fr.) P.Kumm. (1871); Leptoniella Earle (1909); Nigropogon Coker & Couch (1928); Nolanea (Fr.) P.Kumm. (1871); Omphaliopsis (Noordel.) P.D.Orton (1991); Paraeccilia Largent (1994); Paraleptonia (Romagn. ex Noordel.) P.D.Orton (1991); Pouzarella Mazzer (1976); Richoniella Costantin & L.M.Dufour (1900); Rhodocybella T.J.Baroni & R.H.Petersen (1987); Rhodogaster E.Horak (1964); Rhodophyllus Quél. (1886) (nom. illegit.); Trichopilus (Romagn.) P.D.Orton (1991)

= Entoloma =

Genus of fungi

Entoloma is a genus of fungi in the order Agaricales, with the common name of pinkgills. The basidiocarps (fruit bodies) are typically agaricoid (gilled mushrooms), though a minority are gasteroid. All have salmon-pink basidiospores which colour the gills at maturity and are angular (polyhedral) under a microscope. The genus is large, with almost 2000 species worldwide. Most species are saprotrophic, but some are ectomycorrhizal, and a few are parasitic on other fungi. The type, Entoloma sinuatum, is one of several Entoloma species that are poisonous, typically causing mild to severe gastrointestinal illness.

== Taxonomy ==
=== History ===
In 1838 the Swedish mycologist Elias Magnus Fries classified all pink-spored, gilled fungi into "tribes" or "subtribes", placing those with a Tricholoma-like shape and gills attached to the stem into tribe Entoloma. The small subtribe Leptonia had convex fleshy membranaceous caps, the subtribe Nolanea were slender fungi with bell-shaped caps and hollow stems, and the subtribe Eccilia had umbilicate caps and adnate gills. In 1871 German mycologist Paul Kummer raised these tribes and subtribes to genera. Additional genera were added by subsequent authors. Following this classification system, Entoloma has a restricted meaning and has sometimes been referred to as Entoloma sensu stricto.

In 1886 French mycologist Lucien Quélet united all the fungi with pinkish-red adnate or sinuate gills and angular spores into a new genus Rhodophyllus (meaning "pink gill"). Because his new genus included the earlier name Entoloma, Rhodophyllus is illegitimate, as noted by Donk, and Entoloma was subsequently adopted to cover all the pink-spored agarics with angular spores. Following this classification system, Entoloma has a broad meaning and has sometimes been referred to as Entoloma sensu lato. The synonyms listed here are applicable to Entoloma sensu lato.

These two classification systems continue to co-exist, with those taxonomists favouring a broad generic concept following Quélet, and the others a narrow generic concept following Kummer.

=== Current status ===
Recent molecular research, based on cladistic analysis of DNA sequences, has shown that Entoloma sensu lato is monophyletic (a natural grouping), whereas Entoloma sensu stricto, as previously defined, is paraphyletic (an artificial grouping). The other genera (Leptonia, Nolanea, etc., as previously defined) are equally artificial.

Accordingly, Entoloma is now broadly applied by most mycologists, pending further research. Some of the component genera are, however, currently being redefined by DNA sequencing. Thus Nolanea, for example, has been redefined (by excluding some species and adding others) as a monophyletic grouping within Entoloma sensu lato and treated either as a subgenus or as a separate genus. A basal group of species has also been moved to the genus Entocybe based on DNA research.

== Etymology ==
The name Entoloma is derived from the Greek entos (ἐντός) meaning inner and lóma (λῶμα) meaning fringe from the in-rolled margin.

== Description ==
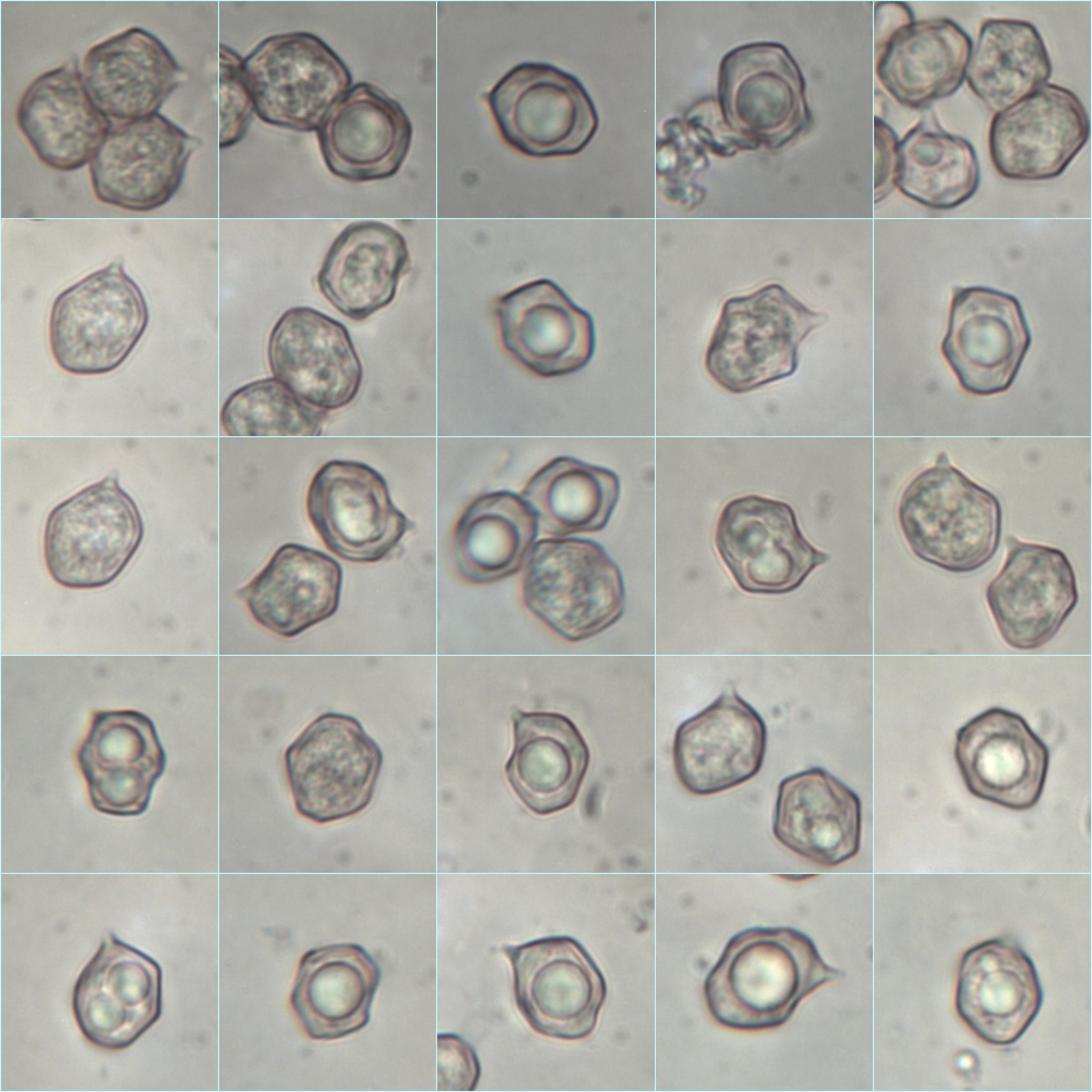
Angular (polyhedral) basidiospores of Entoloma chloropolium

Basidiocarps (fruit bodies) are typically agaricoid (mushroom-shaped with gills), occasionally secotioid or gasteroid (truffle-like). Agaricoid species are variously large and thick-set to small and delicate, but all have lamellae (gills) that are attached to the stem (not free) and become pinkish with age from the pink basidiospores. The stipe (stem) lacks an annulus (ring). A few species are pleurotoid with a small lateral stem. Secotioid and gasteroid species (previously referred to the genera Richoniella and Rhodogaster) have irregularly globose fruit bodies, brownish with a distinct stipe in secotioid species (such as the European Entoloma calongei) or whitish without a stipe in truffle-like species (such as Entoloma gasteromycetoides described from New Zealand). All are internally pinkish (from the spores) when mature. Microscopically, all Entoloma species have basidiospores that are angular in all views.

== Ecology ==
Most species are saprotrophic, growing on decaying plant material or (less commonly) on dead wood. A few species are ectomycorrhizal. Entoloma sinuatum, for example, has been shown to form an association with willows (Salix species) and Entoloma nitidum with hornbeams (Carpinus species). A similar association of Entoloma sepium with fruit trees (Rosaceae) has, however, been shown to be root parasitism, though other studies have suggested some kind of mycorrhizal partnership may exist. A very few species are parasitic on other fungi, notably Entoloma abortivum a parasite of Armillaria species, and Entoloma parasiticum which frequently grows on fruit bodies of Cantharellus species.

Entoloma species are found in a wide variety of habitats, including grasslands and dunes, temperate and tropical forests and woodlands, peat-bogs and moors.

== Conservation ==
Some European Entoloma species are restricted to waxcap grassland (nutrient-poor grassland), a declining habitat as a result of changes in agricultural practice. This decline has led to four European Entoloma species, Entoloma bloxamii, E. griseocyaneum, E. porphyrophaeum, and E. prunuloides, being assessed as globally "vulnerable" on the IUCN Red List of Threatened Species.

Elsewhere, several rare and localized endemic species are assessed as globally "endangered" on the IUCN Red List of Threatened Species. They include Entoloma chilense in Chile, E. eugenei in Japan, Korea, and the Russian Far East, and E. ravinense in Australia. Entoloma alissae in California and E. necopinatum in Chile are assessed as globally "vulnerable".

== Toxic and edible species ==
Several Entoloma species are known to be poisonous, causing gastroenteric symptoms (vomiting, diarrhea, nausea, and abdominal pain). At least one poisonous species, E. rhodopolium, has been found to contain significant quantities of the mycotoxin muscarine. The English naturalist Worthington George Smith mistakenly ate Entoloma sinuatum and was "so continually and fearfully purged, and suffered so much from headache and swimming of the brain, that I really thought that every moment would be my last." Other species known to be poisonous include Entoloma mammosum, E. pascuum, E. strictius, and E. vernum. Additional species reported as poisonous include Entoloma abortivum (reported as edible, below), E. aprile, E. bahusiense, E. grande, E. luridum, E. omiense, and E. quadratum.

Fruit bodies of a number of Entoloma species are reported as being locally consumed, including Entoloma abortivum (reported as toxic, above) and E. clypeatum in Mexico, E. rhodopolium (reported as toxic, above) and E. clypeatum in Ukraine, and E. argyropus in Tanzania. It seems probable that some of these Entoloma species were misidentified and "all should be regarded as potentially dangerous".

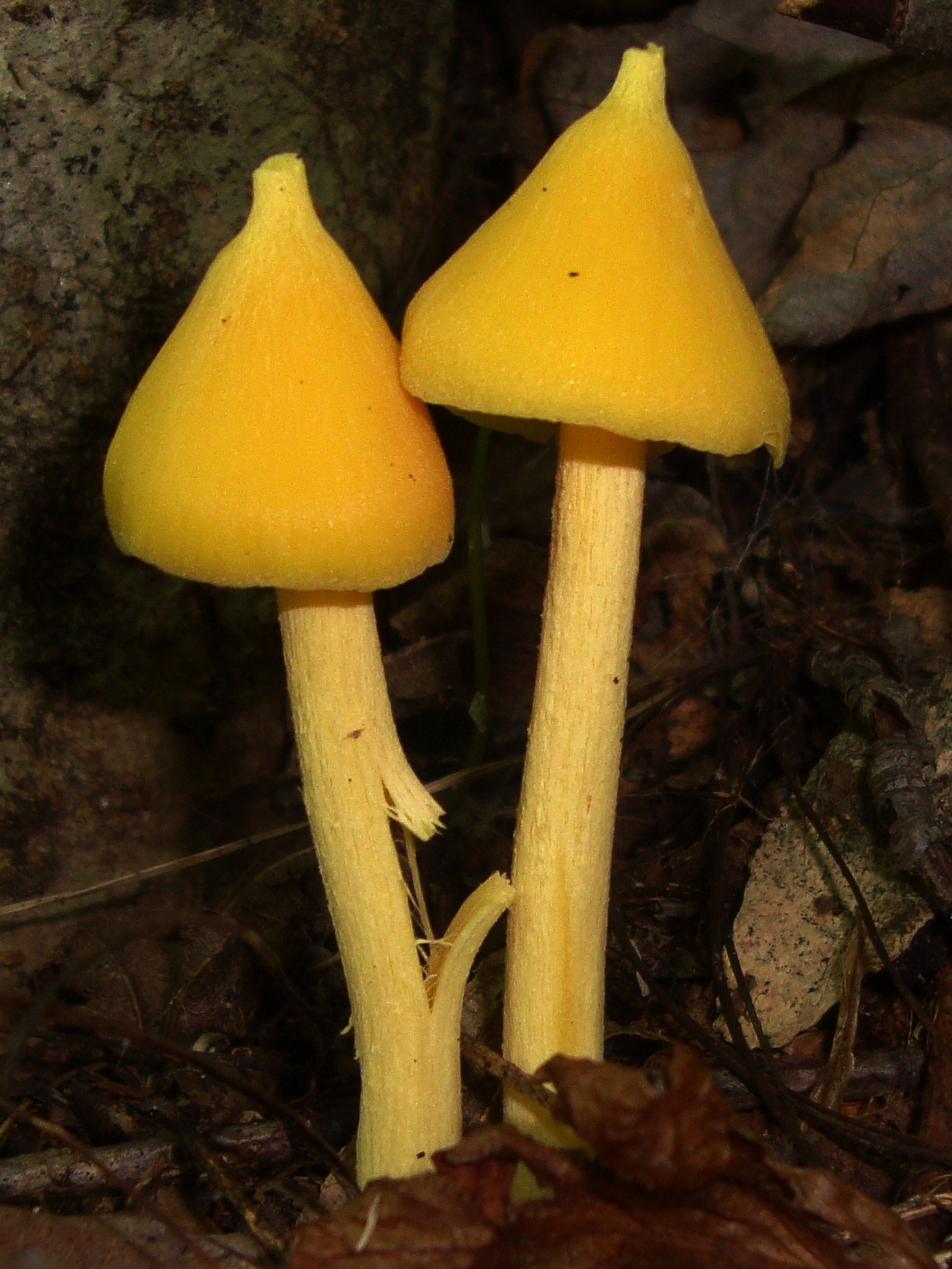
Entoloma murrayi, USA

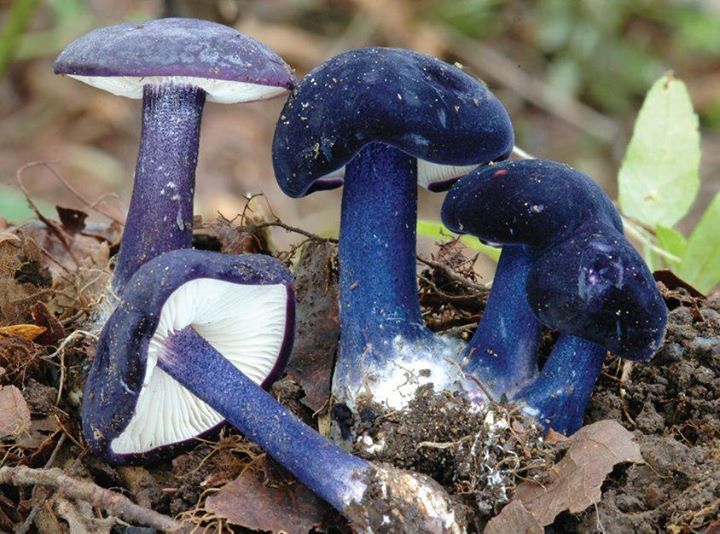
Entoloma eugenei, Russia

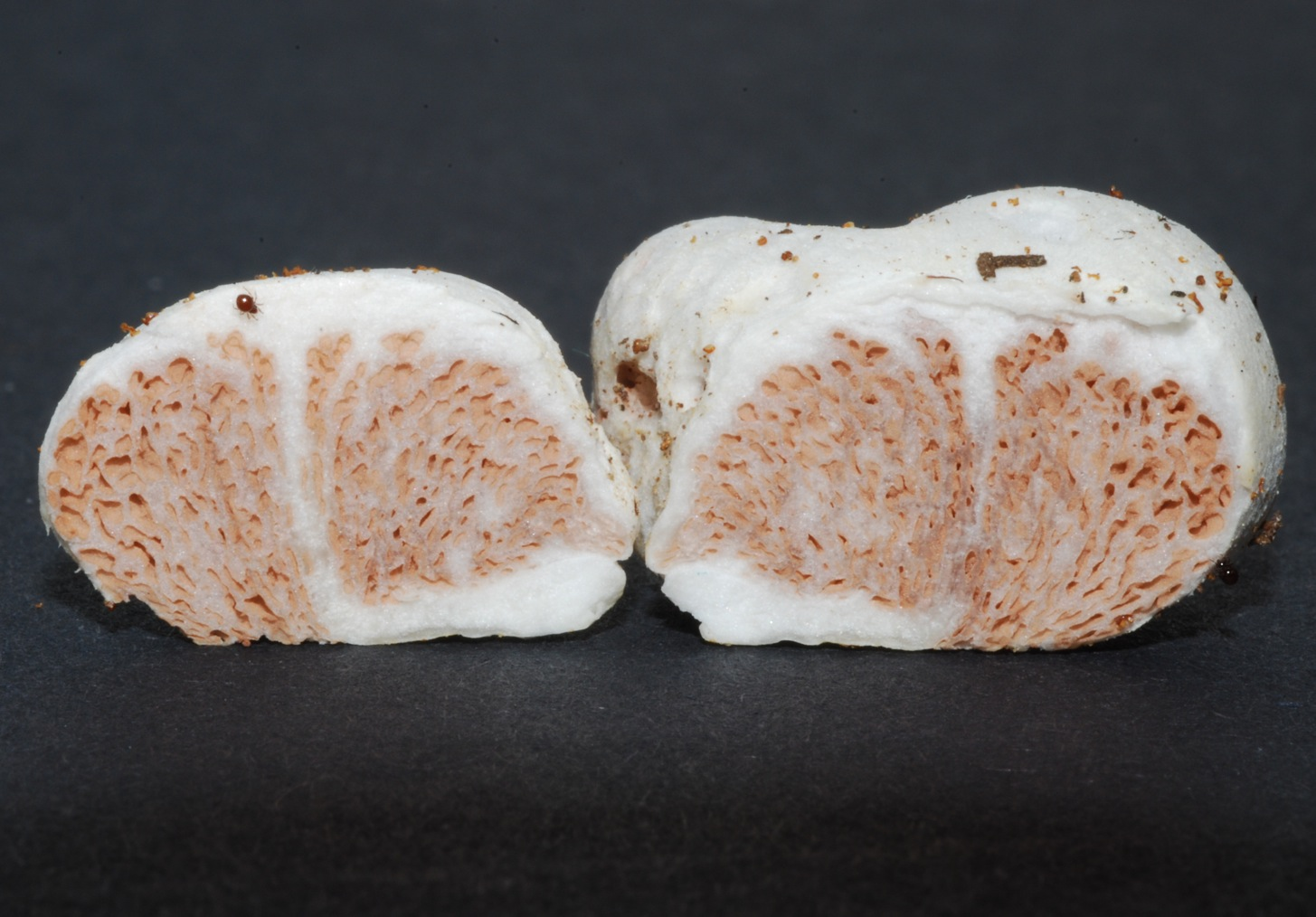
Entoloma gasteromycetoides, New Zealand

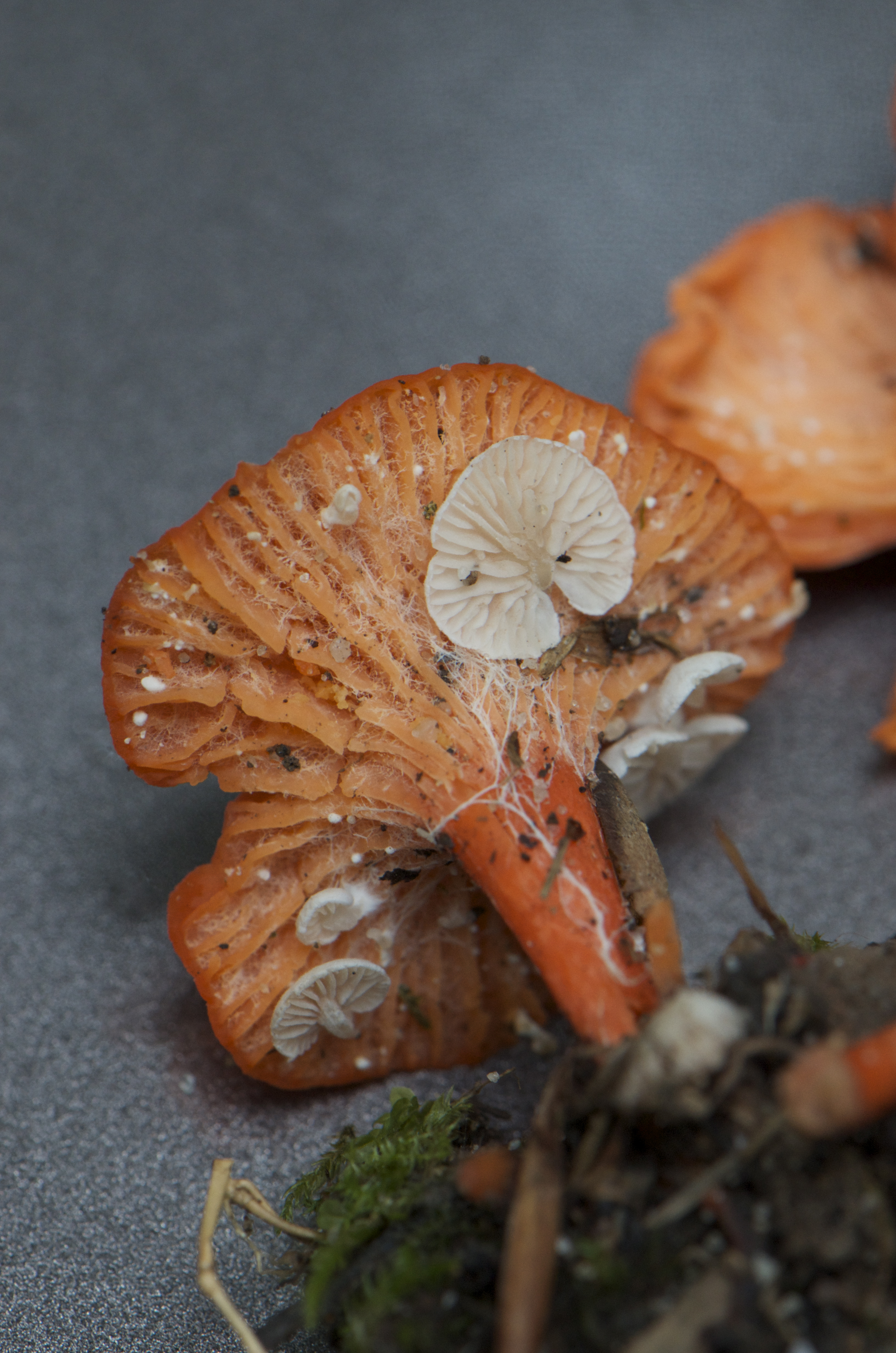
Entoloma parasiticum on Cantharellus fruit body, USA

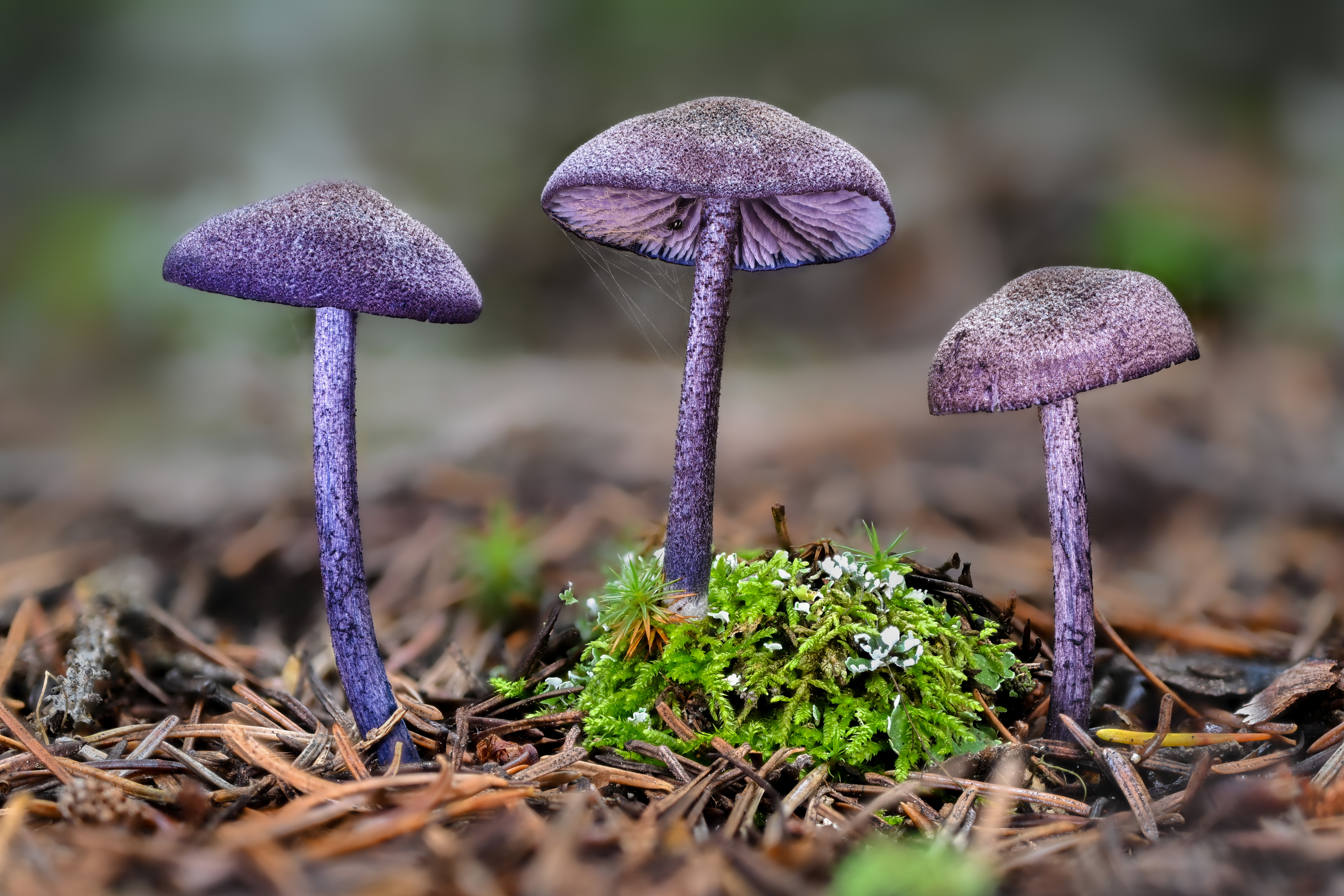
Entoloma occidentale var. metallicum, USA

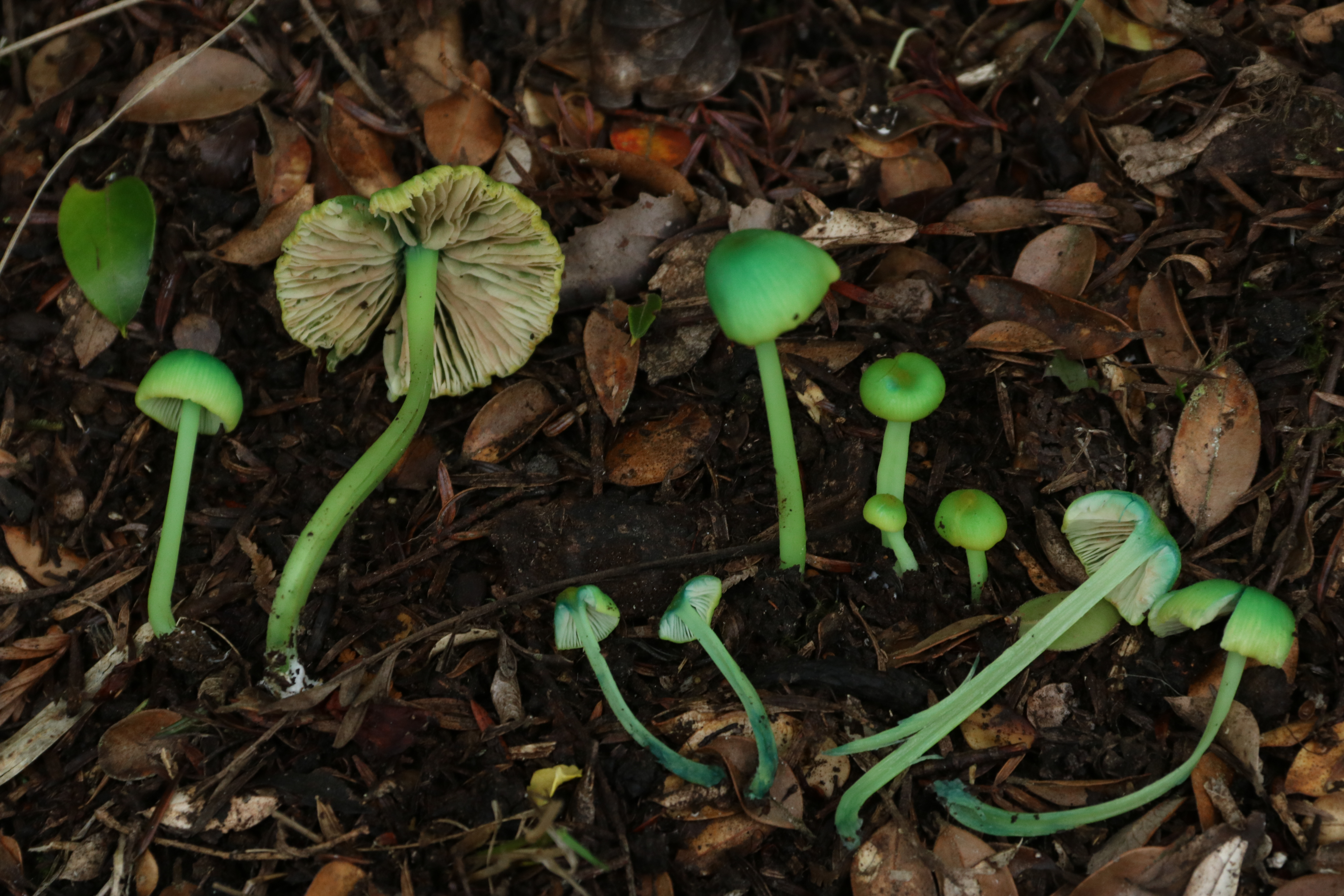
Entoloma necopinatum, Chile

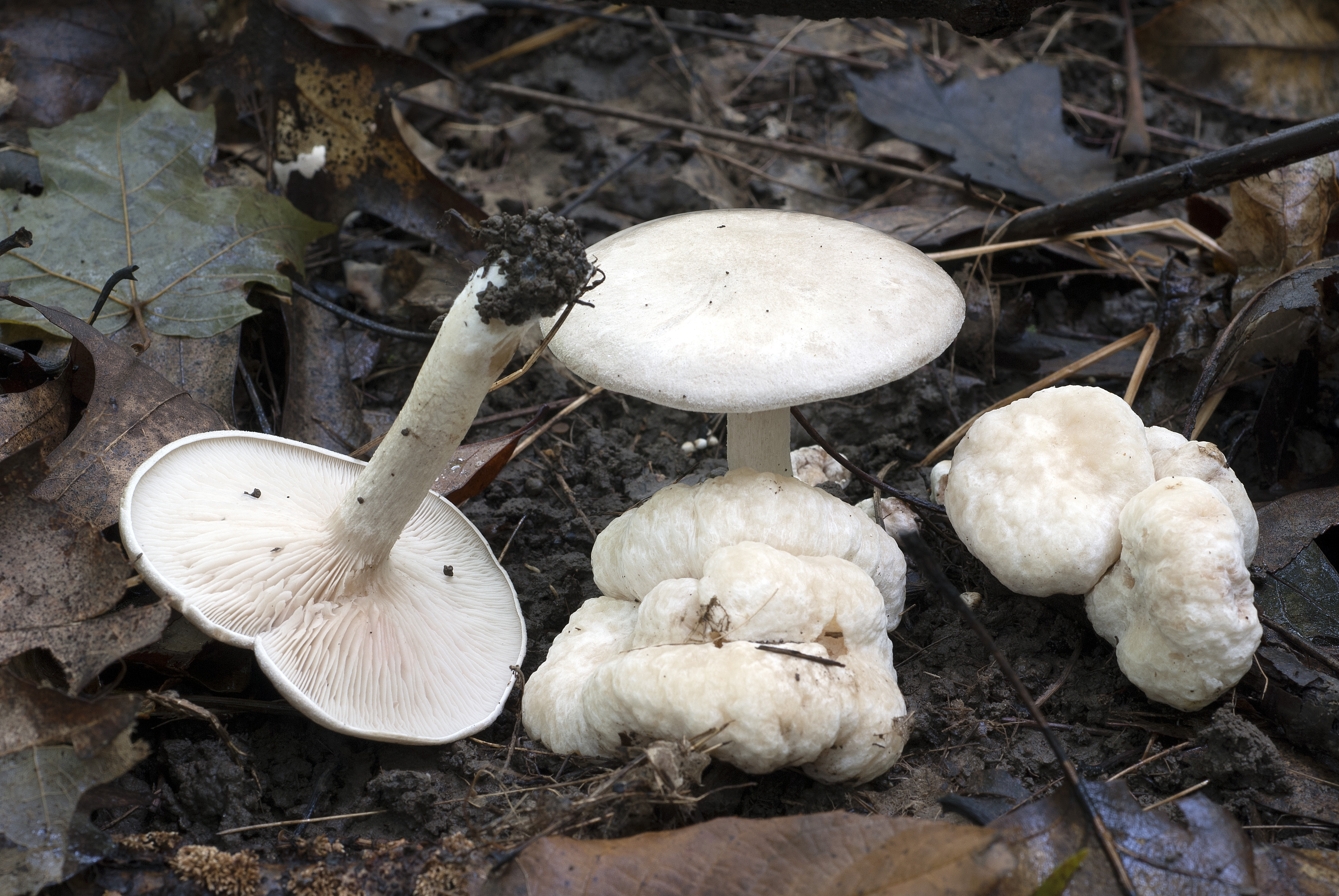
Entoloma abortivum, Canada
