= List of Entolomataceae genera =

The mushroom genera in the family Entolomataceae collectively contain over 1500 species, the large majority of which are in Entoloma. There have been many different classifications of this group, and so the table below includes not only genera which are supposedly current, but also other proposed genera whose names have been important. For instance several taxa such as Leptonia and Nolanea were defined as independent genera, and are still sometimes used as such, but in recent classifications they have been demoted to being subgenera of Entoloma.

Previously there was a view that Entolomataceae with angular (polyhedral) spores should be classified in genus Entoloma, those with bumpy spores should be in Rhodocybe, and those with longitudinally ridged spores should be put in Clitopilus. However DNA studies in 2009 and 2017 have changed this situation for the Rhodocybe/Clitopilus group. Firstly Clitopilus was found to be a clade embedded within Rhodocybe meaning that to avoid polyphyly these genera have to be merged, and although Clitopilus is much smaller, its name takes precedence and should be used for the combined taxon. Secondly on further analysis taking account of morphological characteristics, the older genera Clitopilopsis and Rhodophana have been resurrected and a new genus Clitocella has been created. Also in 2011 the genus Entocybe was defined and accepted. These changes are now incorporated in Species Fungorum and so they should be regarded as accepted.

In spite of these changes Entoloma is an enormous genus, and it is not surprising that attempts have been made to split it up.

The photos sometimes show the type species of the group in question, or otherwise another typical species. Hold the cursor over a photo for more information.

| Genus, author & date | Current status | Further details | Image |
|---|---|---|---|
| Alboleptonia Largent & R.G. Benedict (1970) | Transferred to Entoloma | Sometimes regarded as a subgenus of Entoloma. Contains about 6 species, including E. sericellum. | A. sericella (type species) = Entoloma sericellum |
| Claudopus Gillet (1876) | Transferred to Entoloma | This old genus contained about 9 species which are now classified in the Entolomataceae (all Entoloma). Sometimes regarded as a subgenus of Entoloma. | C. byssisedus (type species) = Entoloma byssisedum |
| Clitocella Kluting, T.J. Baroni & Bergemann (2014) | Currently valid | This new genus of 3 former Rhodocybe species, was defined based on distinctive spore wall characteristics. | C. prunulus |
| Clitopilopsis Maire (1937) | Currently valid | After having invented genus Rhodocybe, Maire made a new genus for these 5 species which was not accepted for many years, the species being classified in Clitopilus or Rhodocybe. Now after DNA analysis the genus has been resurrected. | |
| Clitopilus (Fr. ex Rabenh.) P. Kumm. (1871) | Currently valid | Should contain all species with longitudinally ridged spores and also recently most former Rhodocybe species have been moved into this genus. The best-known member is probably Clitopilus prunulus (the Miller). | C. prunulus |
| Eccilia (Fr.) P. Kumm. (1871) | Transferred to Entoloma (except E. haeusleriana) | May be considered a subgenus of Entoloma. These mushrooms have decurrent gills and have an omphalinoid or pleurotoid form. Contains almost the same species as Claudopus. | E. undata = Entoloma undatum |
| Entocybe T.J. Baroni, V. Hofst. & Largent (2011) | Currently valid | Recently defined based on the spore shape and DNA analysis. | E. sinuatum (type species) |
| Entoloma (Fr.) P. Kumm. (1871) | Currently valid | According to current definition, contains all species with angular spores. | E. sinuatum (type species) |
| Inocephalus (Noordel.) P.D. Orton (1991) | Transferred to Entoloma | 2 species | |
| Leptonia (Fr.) P. Kumm. (1871) | Transferred to Entoloma | May be considered a subgenus of Entoloma. These mushrooms are collybioid and often have a navel-like depression in the centre of the cap. | L. mougeotii = Entoloma mougeotii |
| Nolanea (Fr.) P. Kumm. (1871) | Transferred to Entoloma | May be considered a subgenus of Entoloma. Thin-fleshed species, often conical or campanulate, with gills often almost free from the stem. | N. sericea = Entoloma sericeum |
| Paraeccilia Largent (1994) | Part of Entoloma | This genus proposed in 1994 contained 3 species. | |
| Pouzarella Mazzer (1976) | Part of Entoloma | May be considered a subgenus of Entoloma, with about 10 species. These fungi have campanulate caps and dark gills, and have a fibrous stipe with coarse hairs at the base. | |
| Pouzaromyces Pilát (1953) | Part of Entoloma | May be considered a subgenus of Entoloma, with about 9 species. There is overlap between this subgenus and Pouzarella (e.g. E. versatile). It is similar to Nolanea, but the cap is woolly/fibrous. | |
| Rhodocybe Maire (1925) | Obsolete | Recently merged mostly into Clitopilus, the name of which takes historical priority, but some species moved to Clitocella, Clitopilopsis & Rhodophana. | R. gemina |
| Rhodocybella T.J. Baroni & R.H. Petersen (1987) | Currently valid | Contains just one cyphelloid species, R. rhododendri. Not to be confused with Rhodocyphella, which belongs to the Tricholomataceae. | |
| Rhodogaster E. Horak (1964) | Currently valid | Contains 2 gasteroid species. It is proposed that these species should be integrated into Entoloma. | |
| Rhodophana Kühner (1971) | Currently valid | Considered part of Rhodocybe but resurrected in 2014, based on clamp connections and structure of cap skin. | Rhodophana nitellina |
| Rhodophyllus Quél. (1886) | Obsolete synonym of Entoloma | This name was used by the influential French mycologists Kühner and Romagnesi. | |
| Richoniella Costantin & L.M. Dufour (1916) | Currently valid | Contains 5 gasteroid species. In spite of not having an agaric body plan, it is proposed that this genus should be integrated into Entoloma. | |
