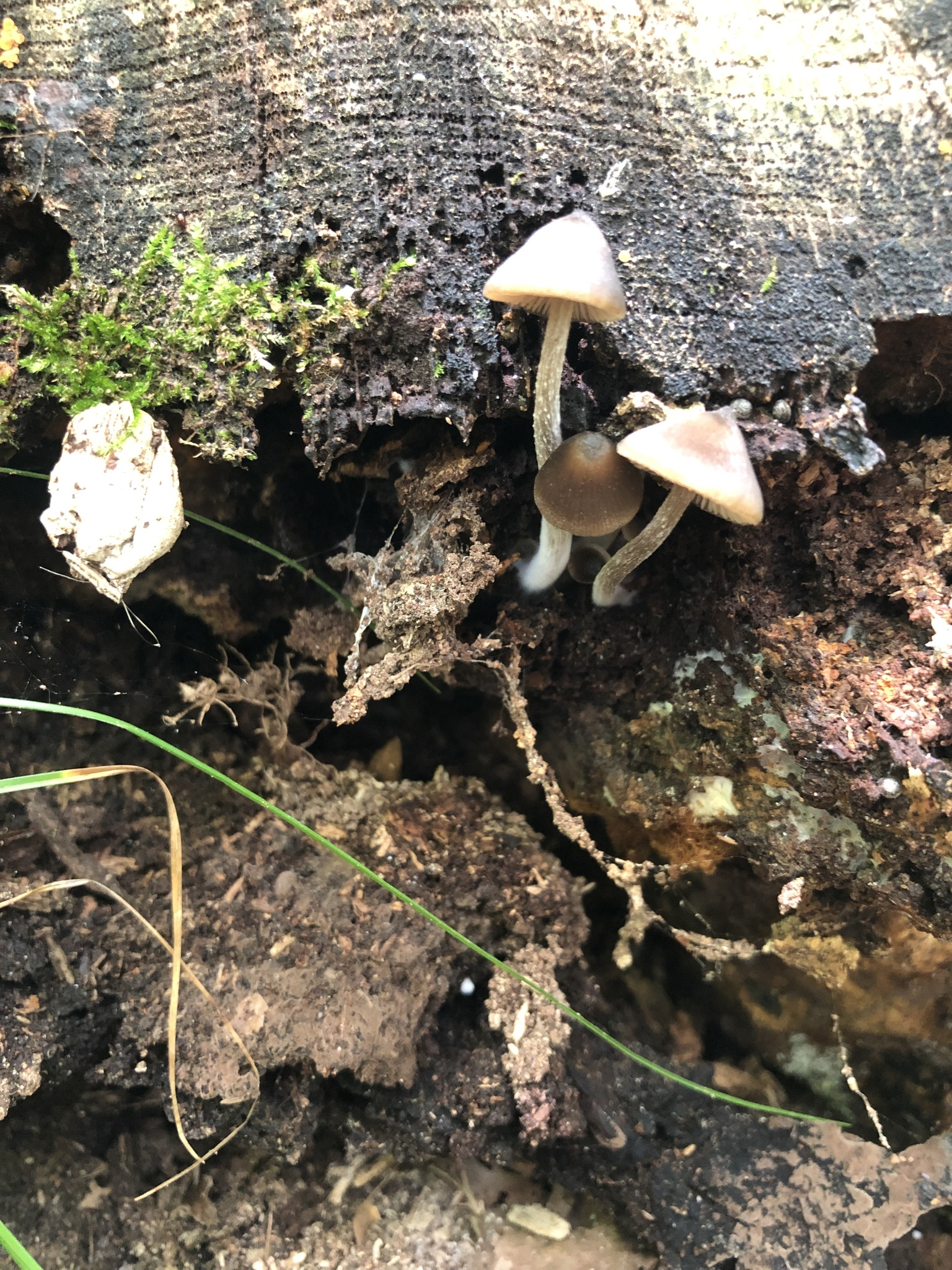

Scientific classification
- Kingdom: Fungi
- Division: Basidiomycota
- Class: Agaricomycetes
- Order: Agaricales
- Family: Entolomataceae
- Genus: Entoloma
- Species: E. cuspidiferum

Binomial name
- Entoloma cuspidiferum Noordel.

= Entoloma cuspidiferum =

Species of fungus

Entoloma cuspidiferum is a species of fungus in the family Entolomataceae, first described by Machiel Noordeloos.

== Distribution and habitat ==
It appears in North America and Europe. It grows in spruce forests, on peaty ground, among Plagiothecium and Sphagnum mosses.
