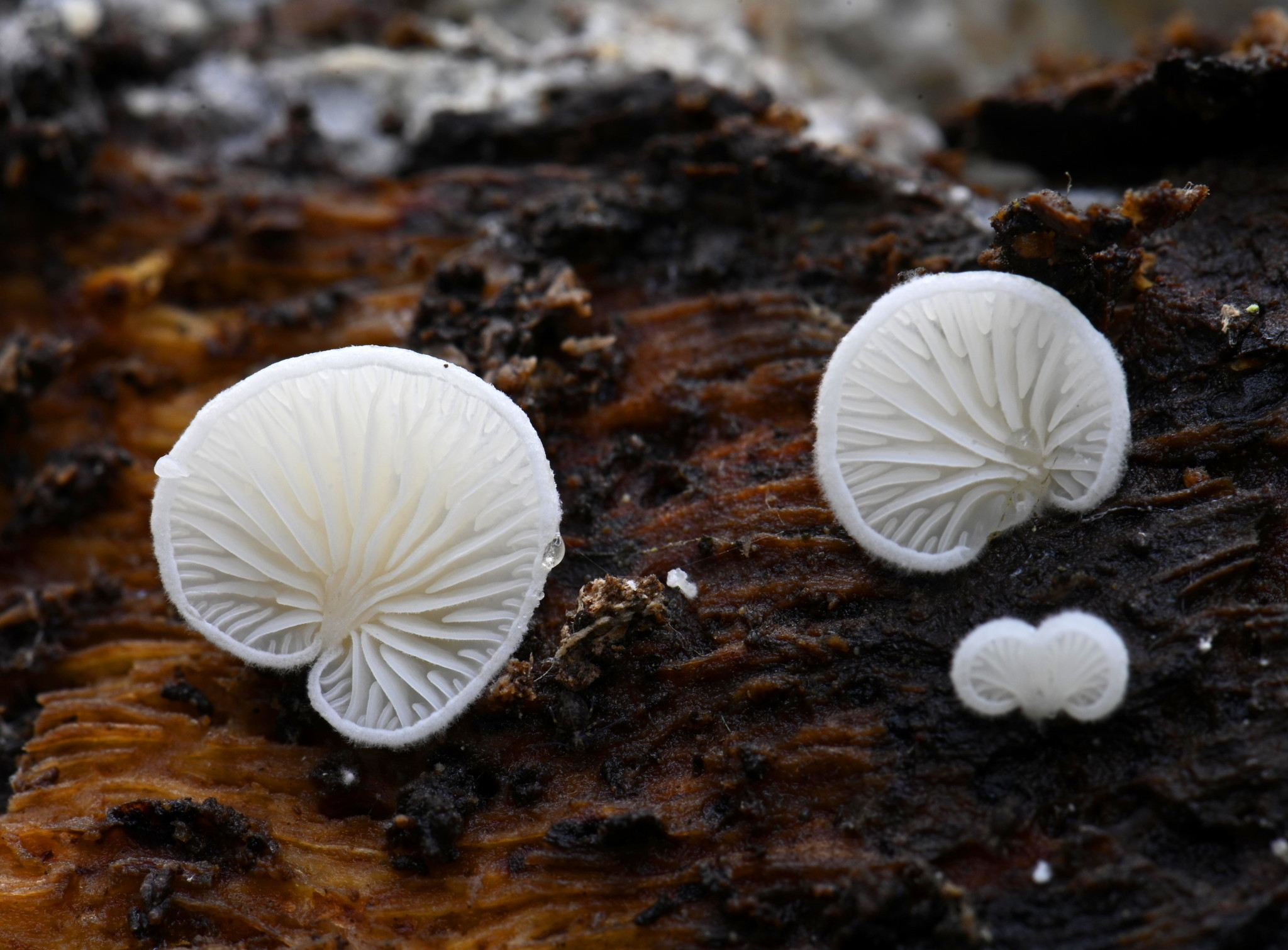

Scientific classification
- Kingdom: Fungi
- Division: Basidiomycota
- Class: Agaricomycetes
- Order: Agaricales
- Family: Entolomataceae
- Genus: Clitopilus
- Species: C. hobsonii

Binomial name
- Clitopilus hobsonii P.D.Orton, 1960

= Clitopus hobsonii =

Species of fungus

Clitopus hobsonii
- Mycological characteristics
- Gills on hymenium
- Cap is convex
- Hymenium attachment is not applicable
- Lacks a stipe
- Spore print is white
- Ecology is saprotrophic
- Edibility is unknown

Clitopilus hobsonii, also known as Miller's oysterling, is a cosmopolitan species of saprotrophic gilled mushroom. It has a pinkish spore deposit.

== Taxonomy ==
Clitopilus hobsonii contains the following varieties:

- Clitopilus hobsonii var. cystidiosus'
