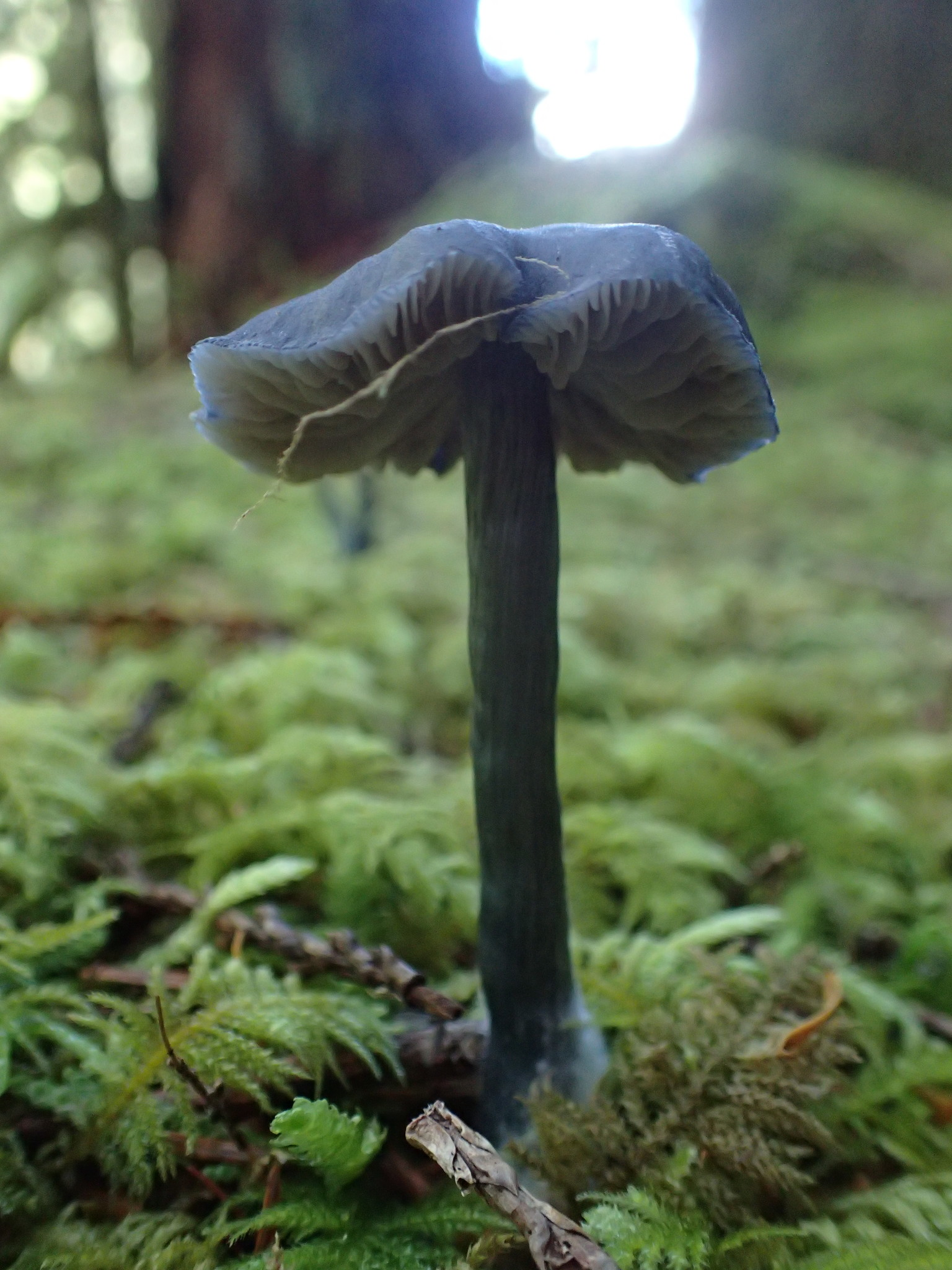

Scientific classification
- Kingdom: Fungi
- Division: Basidiomycota
- Class: Agaricomycetes
- Order: Agaricales
- Family: Entolomataceae
- Genus: Entocybe
- Species: E. nitida

Binomial name
- Entocybe nitida (Quél.) T.J. Baroni, Largent & V. Hofst.

Synonyms
- Entoloma nitidum (Quél.) Quél.; Hyporrhodius nitidus (Quél.) Henn.; Rhodophyllus nitidus (Quél.) Quél.

= Entocybe nitida =

Species of fungus

Entocybe nitida, commonly known as the shining pinkgill, is a species of mushroom in the family Entolomataceae.

== Description ==
The cap of Entocybe nitida is mostly dark blue, but can become lighter as the mushroom gets older. The margins of the cap can also be lighter. The gills are whitish to pinkish and adnexed to notched. The stipe is about 3-8.5 centimeters long and 0.25-0.5 centimeters wide, and blue in color. It is whitish at the base. The spore print is pinkish.

== Habitat and ecology ==
Entocybe nitida is found under conifer trees, where it grows in moss and duff.
