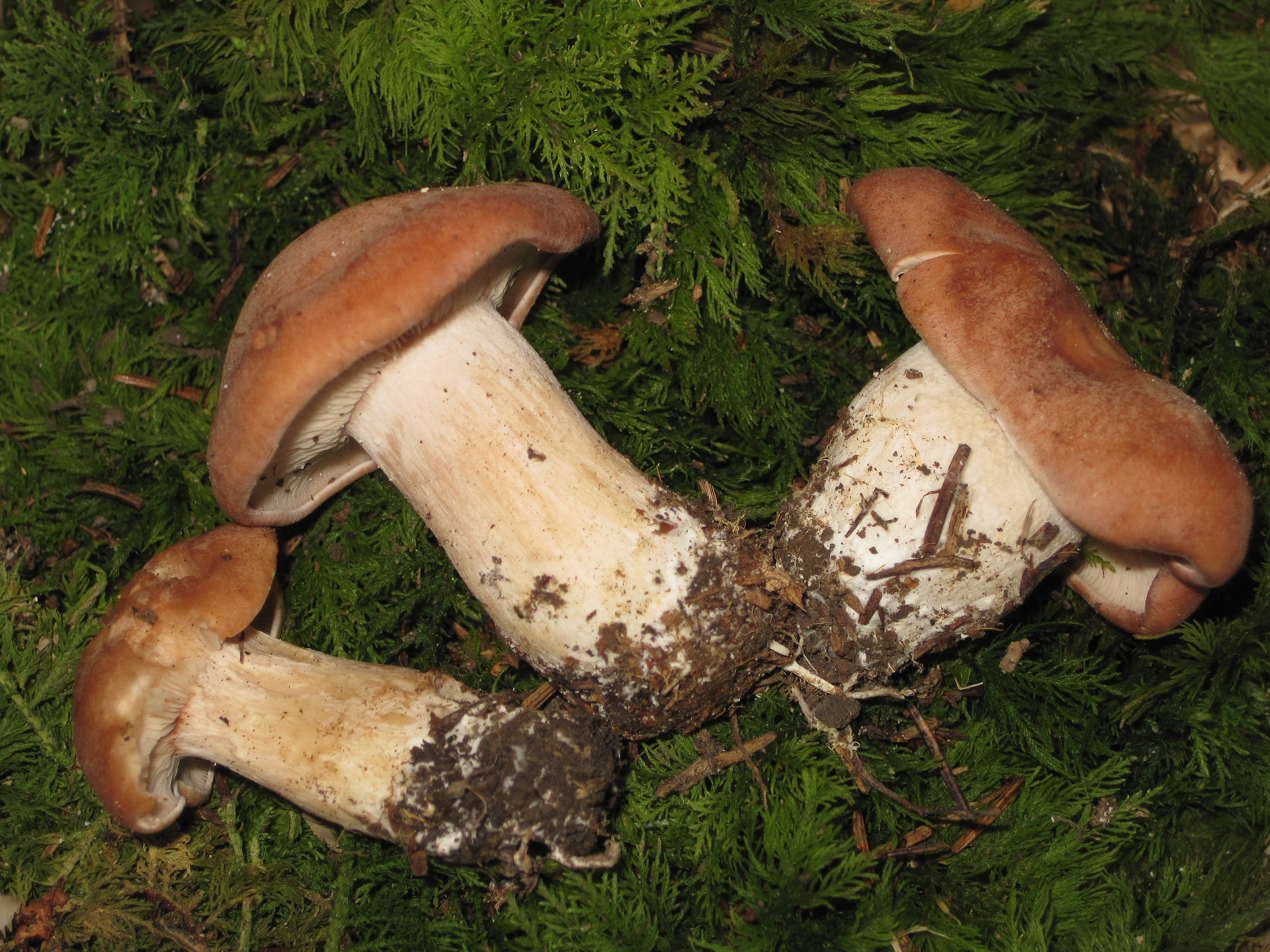

Scientific classification
- Kingdom: Fungi
- Division: Basidiomycota
- Class: Agaricomycetes
- Order: Agaricales
- Family: Entolomataceae
- Genus: Rhodocybe
- Species: R. gemina

Binomial name
- Rhodocybe gemina (Paulet) Kuyper & Noordel. (1987)

Synonyms
- Hypophyllum geminum Paulet (1793); Agaricus geminus (Paulet) Fr. (1838); Gyrophila gemina (Paulet) Quél. (1886); Tricholoma geminum (Paulet) Sacc. (1887); Clitopilus geminus (Paulet) Noordel. & Co-David (2009)

= Rhodocybe gemina =

Species of fungus

Rhodocybe gemina is a species of fungus in the family Entolomataceae. It has the recommended English name of tan pinkgill and produces agaricoid basidiocarps (fruit bodies) that are fleshy and cream when young, becoming brownish when mature.

== Taxonomy ==
The species was originally named Hypophyllum geminum in 1793 by French mycologist Jean-Jacques Paulet and transferred to the genus Rhodocybe in 1987. Prior to this, the species was commonly known as Rhodocybe truncata (Schaeff.) Singer, based on Agaricus truncatus described by Jacob Christian Schäffer in 1774. No original specimen of Schäffer's species exists, however, and the original description is so ambiguous that it has also been referred to the genus Hebeloma (as Hebeloma truncatum (Schaeff.) P. Kumm.) by some authorities. Rhodocybe truncata is now considered a nomen dubium and is no longer in use.

In 2009, as a result of molecular research, based on cladistic analysis of DNA sequences, CoDavid et al. included Rhodocybe gemina in their expanded concept of Clitopilus. Subsequent research showed, however, that Rhodocybe is a monophyletic (natural) genus and that R. gemina belongs within it.

== Description ==
The skin of the cap is matt, not slimy or shiny. The cap is up to 120 mm wide, at first somewhat umbonate, later becoming irregular and flattened, and brownish ochre to pinkish ochre. The gills are adnate to decurrent in attachment and the stem is whitish – often lighter than the gills and relatively short, but always lacking a veil or volva. The spore print is flesh-coloured to salmon-pink. Microscopically the spores are angular when viewed on end; when viewed from the side they are irregularly warted.

A saprotrophic species, it generally grows in woodlands, both broadleaved and occasionally coniferous, but also in grassland and scrub.
