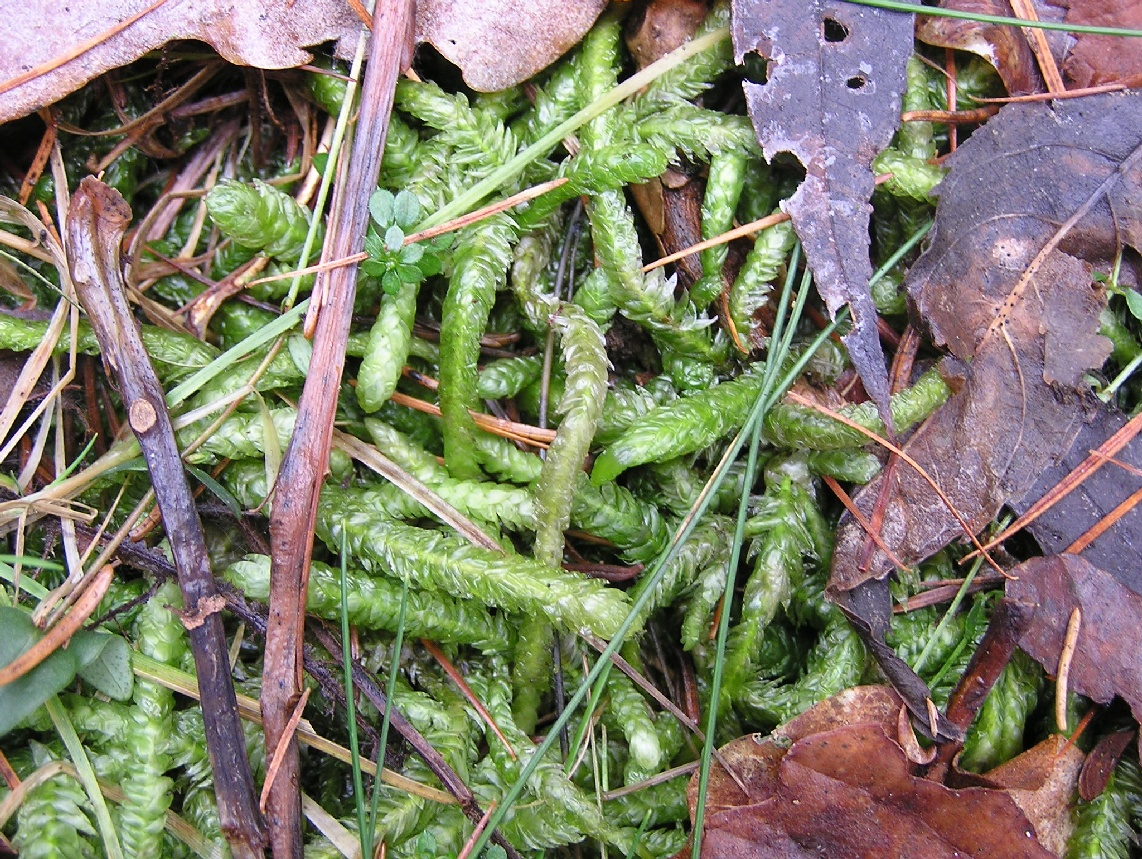

Scientific classification
- Kingdom: Plantae
- Division: Bryophyta
- Class: Bryopsida
- Subclass: Bryidae
- Order: Hypnales
- Family: Plagiotheciaceae
- Genus: Plagiothecium
- Species: P. undulatum

Binomial name
- Plagiothecium undulatum (Hedw.) Schimp.

= Plagiothecium undulatum =

Species of moss

Plagiothecium undulatum (vernacular name: Wavy-leaved cotton moss) is a species of moss belonging to the family Plagiotheciaceae.

It has a cosmopolitan distribution.
