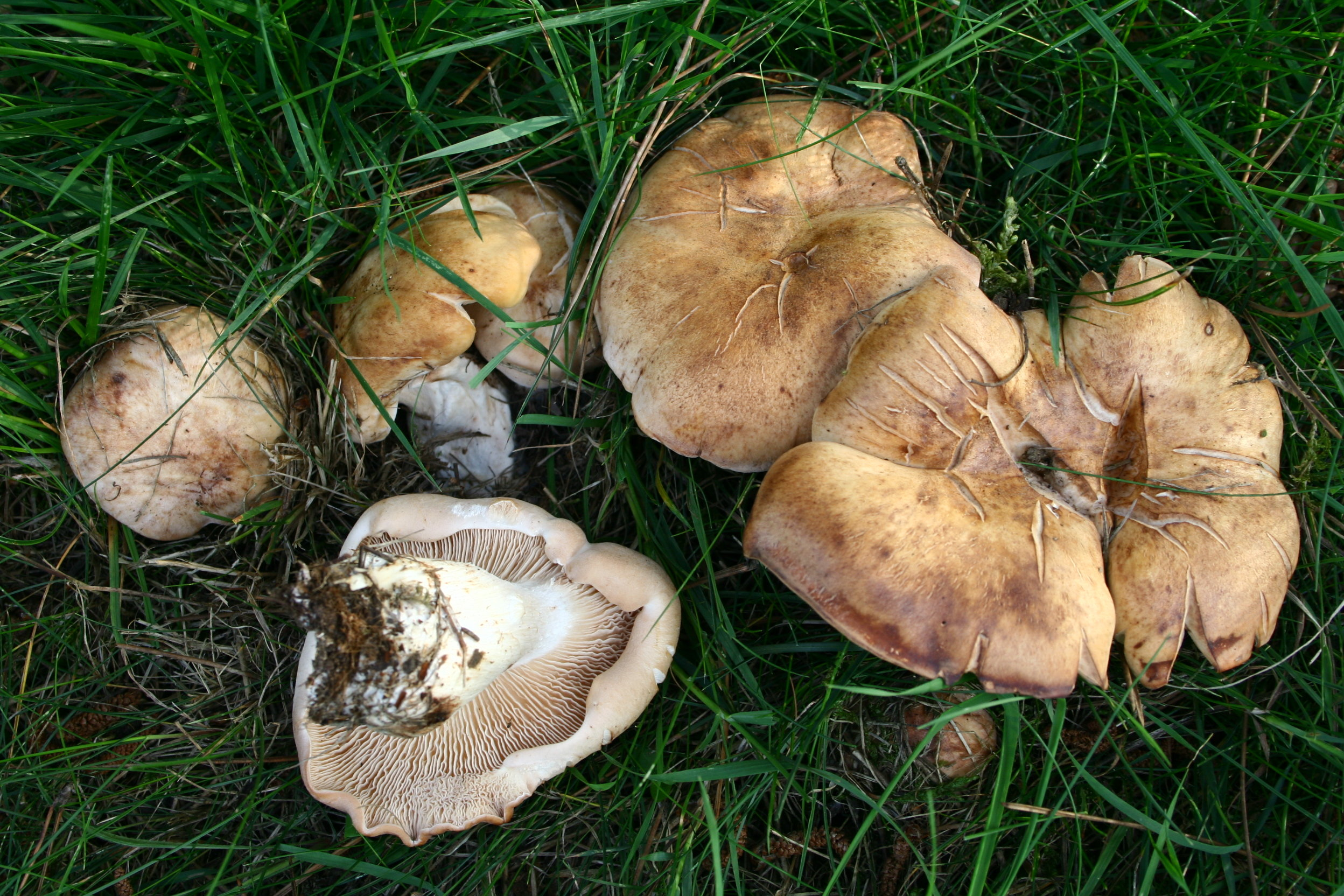
- Rhodocybe gemina

Scientific classification
- Kingdom: Fungi
- Division: Basidiomycota
- Class: Agaricomycetes
- Order: Agaricales
- Family: Entolomataceae
- Genus: Rhodocybe; Maire (1926)

Type species
- Rhodocybe caelata (Fr.) Maire (1926)

Species
- Rhodocybe alutacea Rhodocybe ardosiaca Rhodocybe asanii Rhodocybe asyae Rhodocybe brunnea Rhodocybe caelata Rhodocybe cistetorum Rhodocybe collybioides Rhodocybe dominicana Rhodocybe formosa Rhodocybe fuliginea Rhodocybe fumanellii Rhodocybe fusipes Rhodocybe gemina Rhodocybe griseoaurantia Rhodocybe griseonigrella Rhodocybe incarnata Rhodocybe lateritia Rhodocybe luteocinnamomea Rhodocybe matesina Rhodocybe mellea Rhodocybe pakistanica Rhodocybe pallidogrisea Rhodocybe paurii Rhodocybe pseudoalutacea Rhodocybe roseiavellanea Rhodocybe rhizogena Rhodocybe stipitata Rhodocybe subasyae Rhodocybe tugrulii

= Rhodocybe =

Genus of fungi

Rhodocybe is a genus of fungi in the family Entolomataceae. Basidiocarps (fruit bodies) are agaricoid (gilled mushrooms) producing pink basidiospores that are unevenly roughened or pustular under the microscope. Species are saprotrophic and mostly grow on the ground, occasionally on wood. The genus is distributed worldwide.

== Taxonomy ==
The genus was originally described in 1926 by French mycologist René Maire to accommodate agarics with pink spores that were roughened but not angular (as in the genus Entoloma). In 2009, as a result of molecular research, based on cladistic analysis of DNA sequences, CoDavid et al. found that Clitopilus species form a clade nested within Rhodocybe species and proposed that these genera should be merged so that the new combined genus (called Clitopilus since it is the earlier name) would be monophyletic (a natural group). Additional research, however, showed that the core groupings of Clitopilus and Rhodocybe were both monophyletic, if outlying species were moved to new genera (Rhodophana, Clitocella, and Clitopilopsis). This disposition has been accepted by subsequent authors.

In this revised sense, the genus remains essentially the same except that Rhodocybe nitellina and associated species are now placed in Rhodophana and Rhodocybe popinalis, R. mundula, and associated species are now placed in Clitocella.

== Description ==
Rhodocybe species produce agaricoid fruit bodies of various colours with a pleurotoid, collybioid, mycenoid, clitocyboid, or tricholomatoid habit. The attachment of lamellae ranges from adnexed to subdecurrent. The stipes (stems) are smooth and lack an annulus (ring). The spore print is pink. Microscopically, basidiospores have pronounced undulate-pustulate ornamentations, cystidia are mostly present, and clamp connections are absent.
