= Plagiothecium latebricola =

Scientific classification
- Kingdom: Plantae
- Division: Bryophyta
- Class: Bryopsida
- Subclass: Bryidae
- Order: Hypnales
- Family: Plagiotheciaceae
- Genus: Plagiothecium
- Species: P. latebricola

Binomial name
- Plagiothecium latebricola Schimp.

Species of moss

Plagiothecium latebricola is a species of moss belonging to the family Plagiotheciaceae.

Synonym:

- Hypnum scitulum Austin
- Isopterygium latebricola (Schimp.) Delogne
- Philoscia latebricola (Schimp.) Berk.
- Plagiotheciella latebricola (Schimp.) M. Fleisch.
