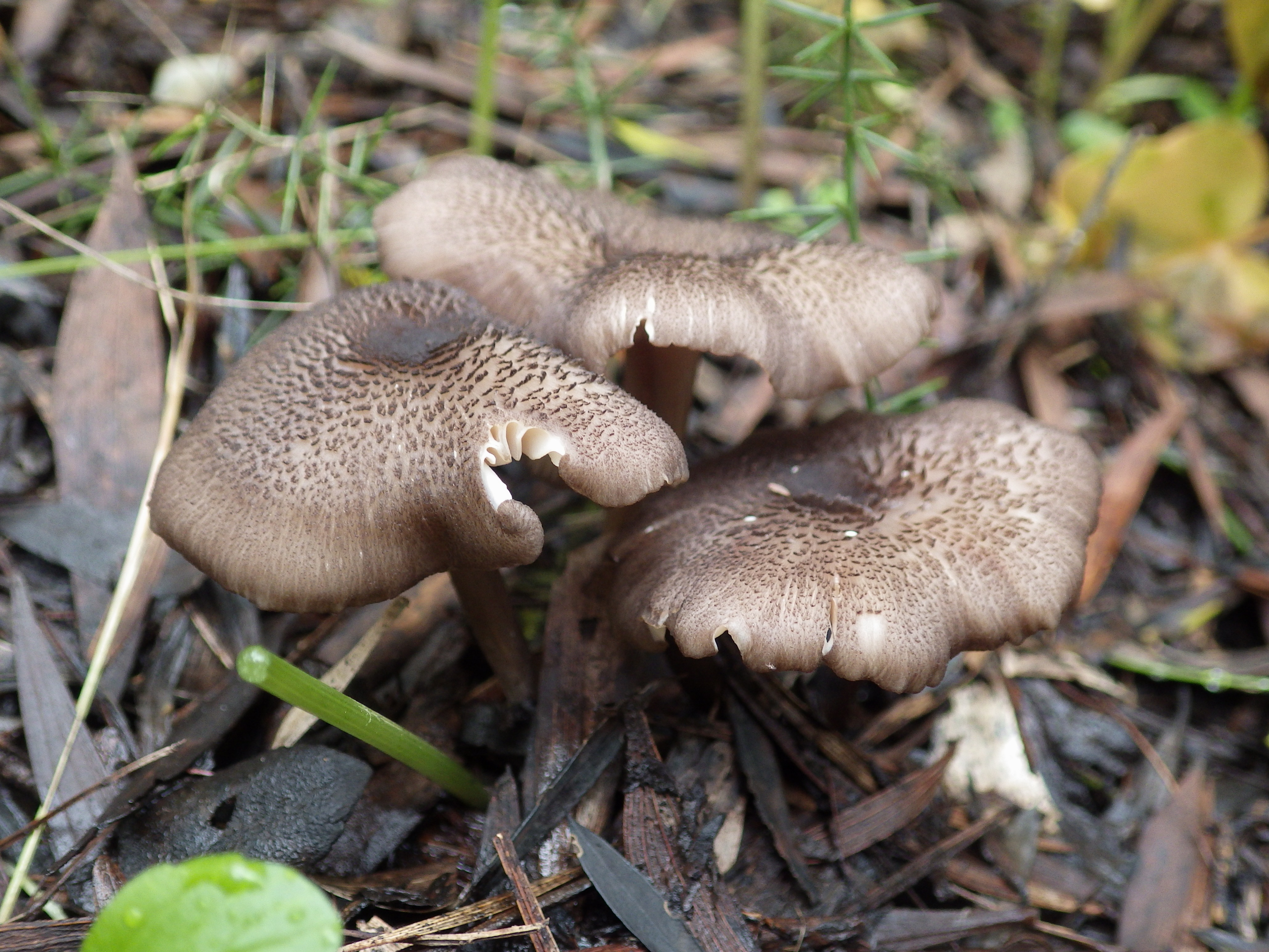

Scientific classification
- Kingdom: Fungi
- Division: Basidiomycota
- Class: Agaricomycetes
- Order: Agaricales
- Family: Entolomataceae
- Genus: Entoloma
- Species: E. turci

Binomial name
- Entoloma turci (Bres.) M.M.Moser (1978)

Synonyms
- Leptonia turci Bres. (1881); Rhodophyllus turci (Bres.) Kühner & Romagn. (1953); Entoloma turci var. marginatum Bon (1980)

= Entoloma turci =

Species of fungus

Entoloma turci is a species of fungus found in Europe.

== See also ==
- List of Entoloma species
