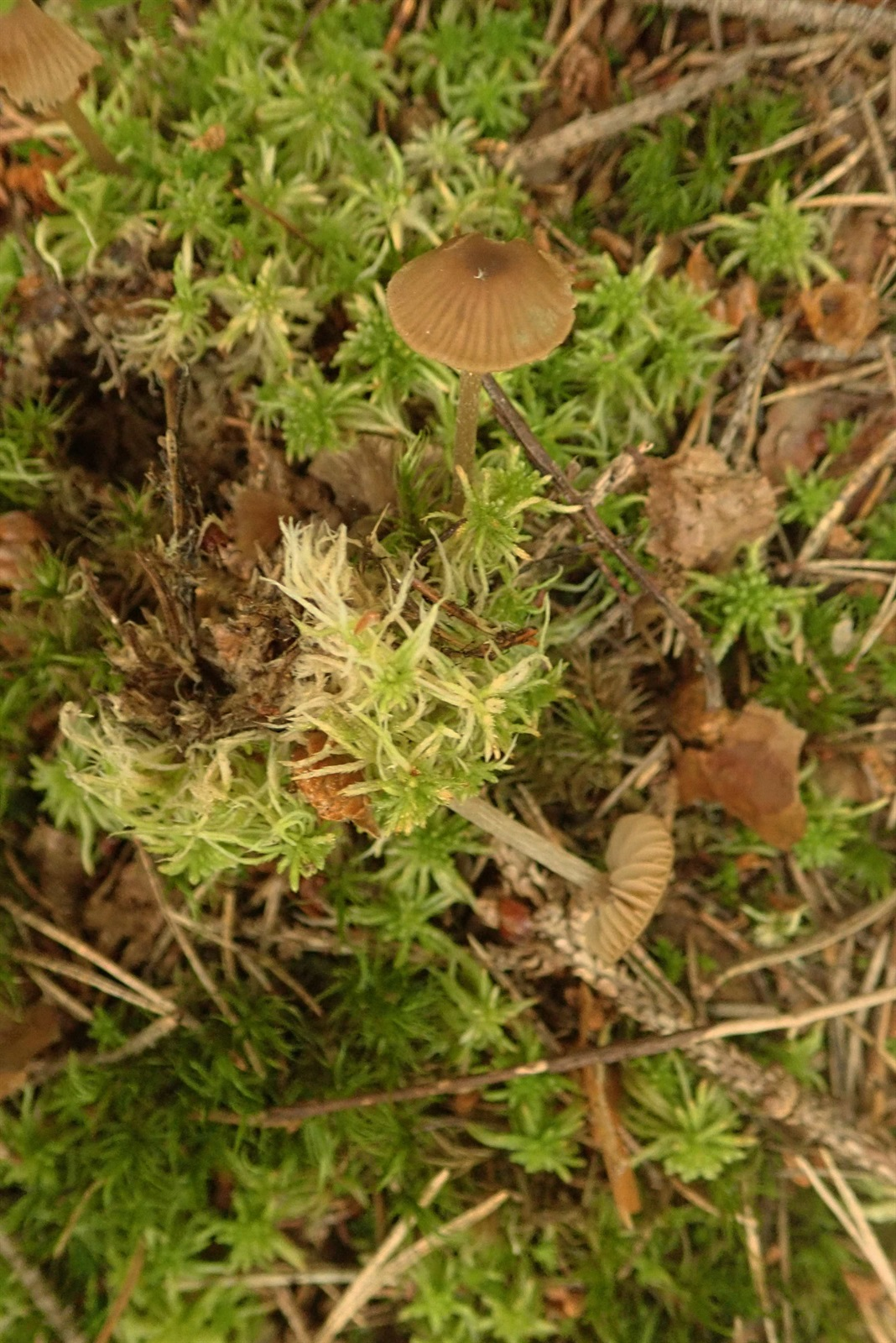

Scientific classification
- Kingdom: Fungi
- Division: Basidiomycota
- Class: Agaricomycetes
- Order: Agaricales
- Family: Entolomataceae
- Genus: Entoloma
- Species: E. sphagnorum

Binomial name
- Entoloma sphagnorum (Romagn. & J. Favre) Bon & Courtec. 1987

= Entoloma sphagnorum =

Species of fungus

Entoloma sphagnorum is a species of fungus in the family Entolomataceae.

== Distribution and habitat ==
It appears in Europe.
