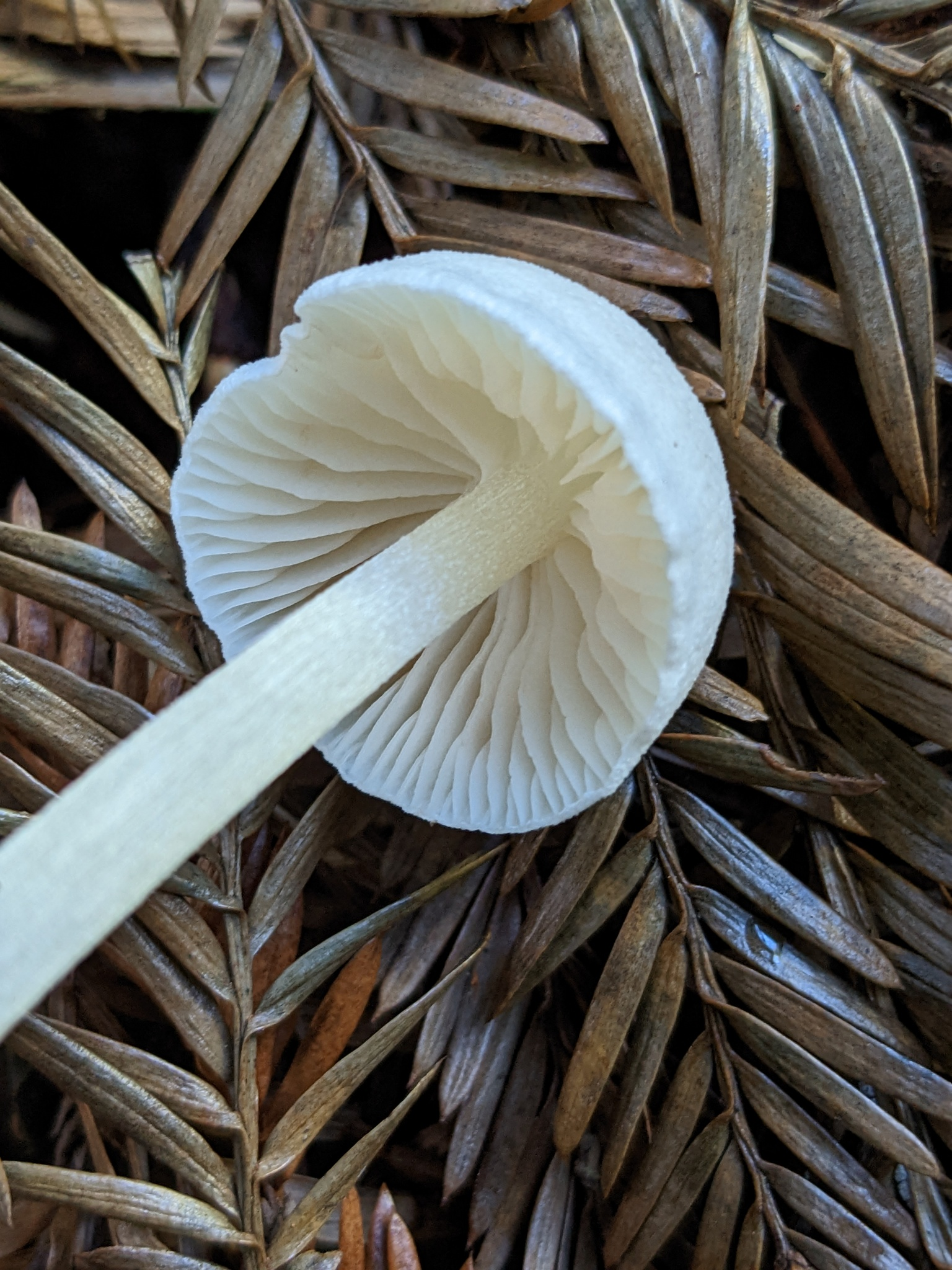

Scientific classification
- Kingdom: Fungi
- Division: Basidiomycota
- Class: Agaricomycetes
- Order: Agaricales
- Family: Entolomataceae
- Genus: Entoloma
- Species: E. adnatifolium

Binomial name
- Entoloma adnatifolium (Murrill) Blanco-Dios

Synonyms
- Alboleptonia adnatifolia (Murrill) Largent & R.G. Benedict

= Entoloma adnatifolium =

Species of fungus

Entoloma adnatifolium
- Mycological characteristics
- Gills on hymenium
- Cap is convex
- Hymenium is adnate
- Stipe is bare
- Spore print is pinkish-brown
- Edibility is unknown

Entoloma adnatifolium is a species of mushroom in the family Entolomataceae.

== Description ==
The cap of Entoloma adnatifolium can be beige or whitish and is about 1-6 centimeters in diameter. It can be dome-shaped, convex, conical, or umbilicate. It is fibrillose. The stipe is about 2-9 centimeters long and 2-5 millimeters wide. It is sometimes slightly wider at the base. The gills are whitish to pinkish in color. They are adnate. The spore print is pinkish.

== Habitat and ecology ==
Entoloma adnatifolium is found in forests, where it grows under western redcedar.
