= Entoloma pleopodium =

Scientific classification
- Kingdom: Fungi
- Division: Basidiomycota
- Class: Agaricomycetes
- Order: Agaricales
- Family: Entolomataceae
- Genus: Entoloma
- Species: E. pleopodium

Binomial name
- Entoloma pleopodium (Bull.) Nordel.

Synonyms
- Agaricus pleopodius Bull.

Species of fungus

Entoloma pleopodium
- Mycological characteristics
- Gills on hymenium
- Cap is convex or flat
- Hymenium is adnate or emarginate
- Stipe is bare
- Spore print is salmon
- Ecology is saprotrophic
- Edibility is unknown

Entoloma pleopodium, commonly known as the olive pinkgill or aromatic pinkgill, is a species of mushroom in the family Entolomataceae. It can be found in Europe and the Pacific Northwest.

== Description ==
The cap of Entoloma pleopodium can be greenish, yellowish, or olive brown. It can be convex, flat, or depressed. The gills start out whitish and become pink as the mushroom gets older. They can be emarginate, adnate, or nearly free. The stipe is brownish or tan and about 2-7 centimeters long and 3-6 millimeters wide. It is fibrillose. The spore print can be pinkish or salmon. This mushroom has a distinctive smell, said to be similar to apples or pear drops.

== Habitat and ecology ==
Entoloma pleopodium is found in parks and lawns, in cities, and on the edges of forests. In cities, it can be under trees, and on forest edges it can be found with rhododendron and stinging nettles. It is saprophytic.
