= Clitopilus byssisedoides =

Scientific classification
- Kingdom: Fungi
- Division: Basidiomycota
- Class: Agaricomycetes
- Order: Agaricales
- Family: Entolomataceae
- Genus: Clitopilus
- Species: C. byssisedoides

Binomial name
- Clitopilus byssisedoides Gminder, Noordel. & Co-David (2010)

Species of fungus

Clitopilus byssisedoides is a species of fungus in the family Entolomataceae. It was formally described as new to science in 2010, based on specimens found growing in a greenhouse in Botanischer Garten Jena, in Germany.

== Taxonomy ==
The species was first mentioned by Andreas Gminder in a 2005 publication, who provisionally called it Rhodocybe byssisedoides because of its similarity to the species Entoloma byssisedum. Since that publication, a molecular phylogenetics analysis has shown that Clitopilus is nested within Rhodocybe, and both genera have been subsumed into a broader definition of Clitopilus. Clitopilus byssisedoides was formally described in a 2010 Mycotaxon publication. The authors suggest that it should be classified in the section Claudopodes, of the former genus Rhodocybe, as defined by Timothy J. Baroni in 1981. This infrageneric grouping of species is characterized by stipes that are either absent or laterally attached to the cap, and pleurocystidia (cystidia on the gill face) lacking brightly colored pigments.

== Description ==
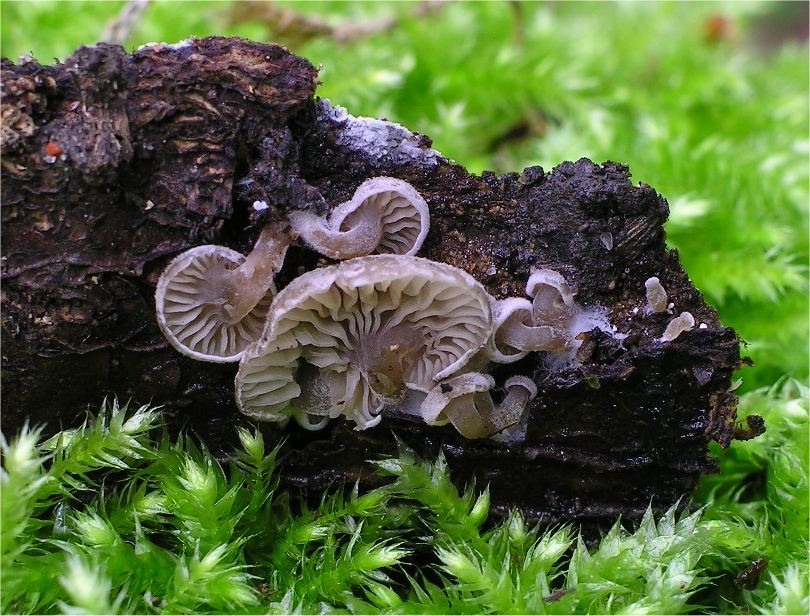
Clitopilus byssisedoides was named for its resemblance to Entoloma byssisedum, shown here.

The fruit bodies of C. byssisedoides are pleurotoid (referring to gilled mushrooms with off-center stipes that grow on wood), and attached to its substrate with distinct rhizomorphs. The cap is convex, and the margin is wavy and rolled inward, so that each of the individual caps is shell-shaped. The caps attain diameters of up to 20 mm (0.8 in) The color is grayish and the surface smooth and hygrophanous, and partially translucent, so that the outlines of the gills can be seen. The gills are moderately distantly spaced, and initially creamy-gray before turning dark ochre with age. The mushrooms are sessile, lacking a distinct stipe. The mushroom flesh is very thin, and has a watery grayish-cream color.

The spores are elliptical to pip-shaped, slightly thick-walled, and covered with isolated bumps and ridges. When viewed in profile under a light microscope they appear weakly angular, and have dimensions of 5.5–7 by 4–4.5 μm. They are strongly cyanophilous, meaning the spore walls will readily absorb Methyl blue stain. The basidia (spore-bearing cells in the hymenium) are four-spored and measure 15–32 by 5–9 μm. The gill edge is fertile, and lacks cystidia. The cap cuticle is a compact cutis (characterized by hyphae that are repent, that is, running parallel to the cap surface) of narrow (2–6 μm wide), cylindrical hyphae, gradually passing into cap tissue with incrusted pigment. The cap flesh is made up of cylindrical hyphae measuring 4–12 μm wide. Clamp connections are absent.

== Habitat and distribution ==
Clitopilus byssisedoides was found growing on decayed wood in pot with Phalaenopsis (Orchidaceae) in a tropical hothouse in the Jena Botanical Garden. The authors suggest the species is likely of tropical origin.
