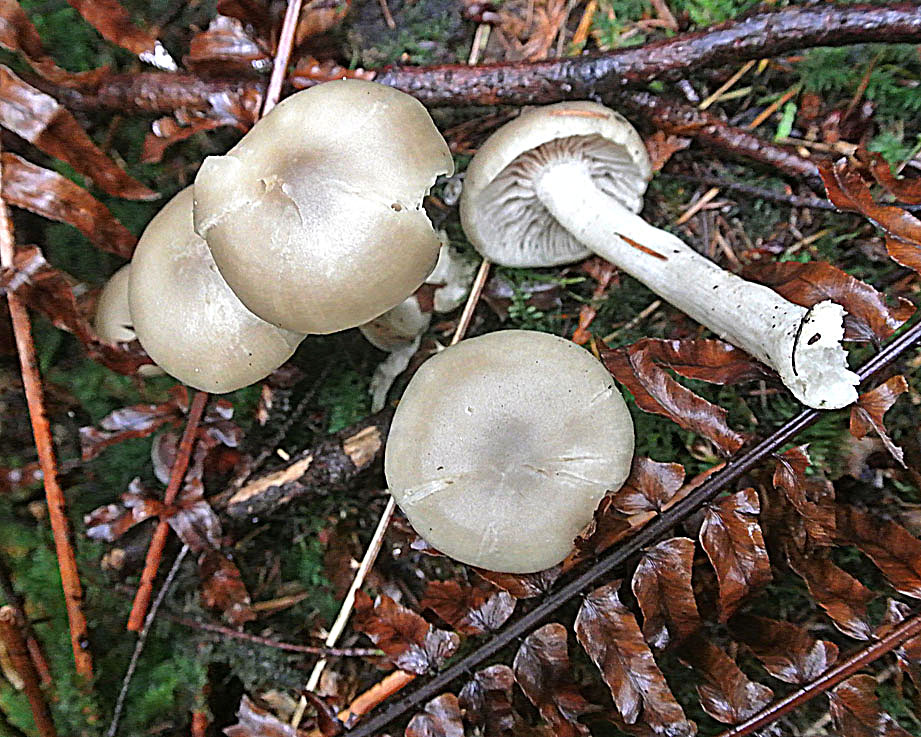

Scientific classification
- Kingdom: Fungi
- Division: Basidiomycota
- Class: Agaricomycetes
- Order: Agaricales
- Family: Entolomataceae
- Genus: Entoloma
- Species: E. sericellum

Binomial name
- Entoloma sericellum (Fr.) P.Kumm. (1871)

Synonyms
- Agaricus sericeus ß sericellus Fr. (1818); Alboleptonia sericella (Fr.) Largent & R.G.Benedict (1970)

= Entoloma sericellum =

Species of fungus

Entoloma sericellum is a species of mushroom-forming fungus belonging to the family Entolomataceae.

The cap grows up to 5 centimetres (2 in) wide. It is dry, white, and covered by tiny fibrils. The gills are white and fragile. The stipe is up to 5 cm long, thin, white, and sometimes translucent. The cap and stipe yellow in age, while the gills turn pinkish from the spores as they mature.

The species appears in conifer and hardwood forests in North America. It is inedible.
