= Isopterygiopsis =

Scientific classification
- Kingdom: Plantae
- Division: Bryophyta
- Class: Bryopsida
- Subclass: Bryidae
- Order: Hypnales
- Family: Plagiotheciaceae
- Genus: Isopterygiopsis; Z.Iwats.

Genus of mosses

Isopterygiopsis is a genus of mosses belonging to the family Plagiotheciaceae.

The genus has cosmopolitan distribution.

Species:

- Isopterygiopsis alpicola Hedenäs, 1988
- Isopterygiopsis muelleriana Iwatsuki, 1970
