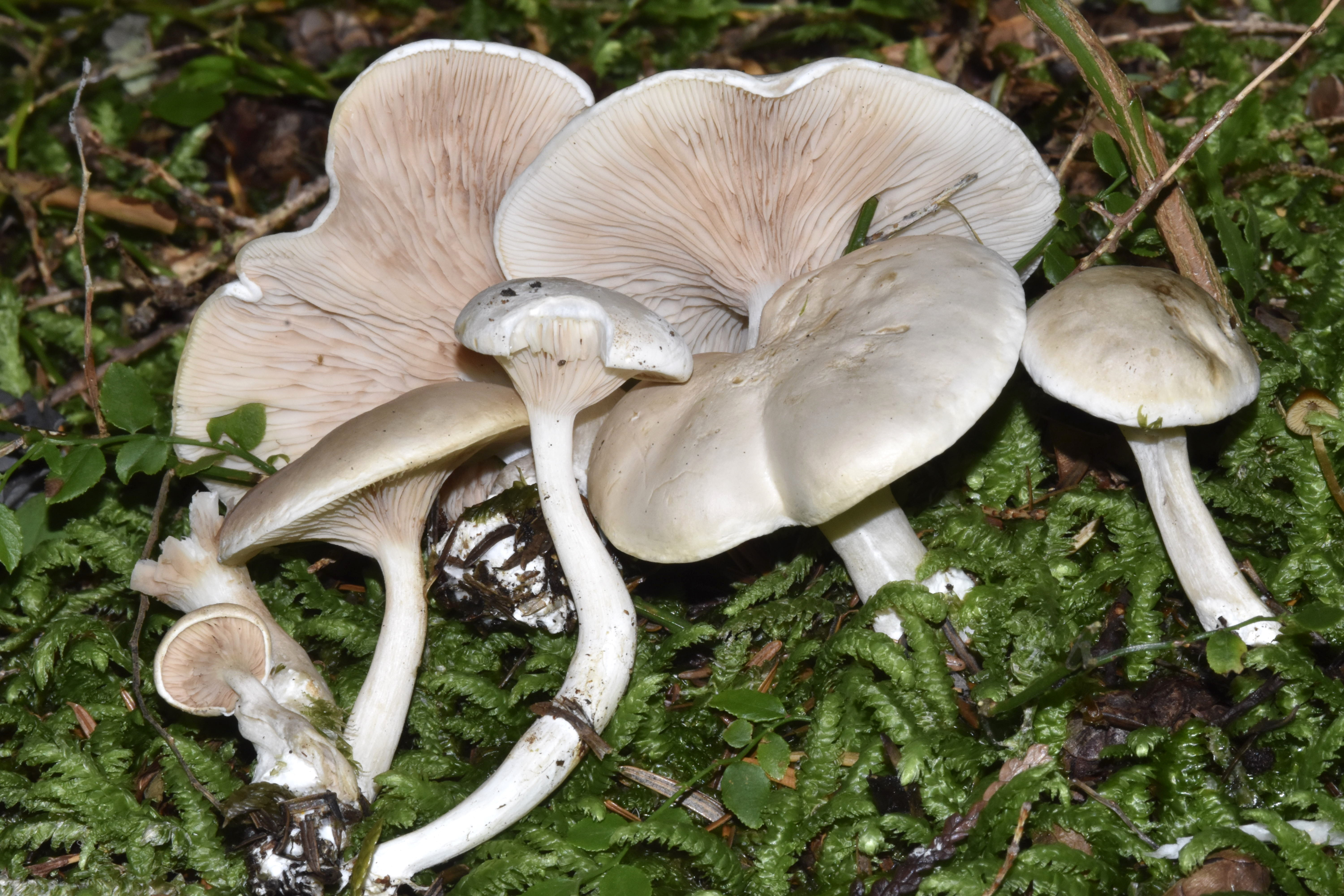

Scientific classification
- Kingdom: Fungi
- Division: Basidiomycota
- Class: Agaricomycetes
- Order: Agaricales
- Family: Entolomataceae
- Genus: Clitopilus
- Species: C. prunulus

Binomial name
- Clitopilus prunulus (Scop. ex Fr.) P. Kumm.

Synonyms
- Agaricus prunulus Scop., 1772; Agaricus orcella Bull., 1793; Paxillopsis prunulus (Scop.) J.E.Lange; Pleuropus prunulus (Scop.) Murrill

= Clitopilus prunulus =

Clitopilus prunulus
- Mycological characteristics
- Gills on hymenium
- Cap is convex
- Hymenium is decurrent
- Stipe is bare
- Spore print is pink
- Ecology is saprotrophic
- Edibility is choice but not recommended

Clitopilus prunulus, commonly known as the miller, the spy, or the sweetbread mushroom, is a basidiomycete mushroom. It has a grey to white cap, decurrent gills, and pink spores.

It is found in grasslands in Europe and North America. Growing solitary to gregarious in open areas of conifer/hardwood forests; common under Bishop pine (Pinus muricata) along the coast north of San Francisco; fruiting shortly after the fall rains. It is edible.

== Taxonomy ==
Tyrolean naturalist Giovanni Antonio Scopoli described the miller as Agaricus prunulus in 1772. French mycologist Pierre Bulliard called it Agaricus orcella in 1793. German botanist Paul Kummer erected the genus Clitopilus and gave the miller its current name in 1871. C. prunulus is the type species of the genus, the limits of which have been redefined more than once.

Populations from Yunnan and Taiwan previously considered consistent with C. prunulus were described as a separate species—Clitopilus amygdaliformis—in 2007.

Its common names—the miller and sweetbread mushroom—are derived from its distinctive smell.

== Description ==
The cap is initially convex when young, but in maturity flattens out, usually with a shallow central depression; the margin is often inrolled. The cap ranges from white to light gray or yellow. It has a characteristic feel similar to the touch of chamois skin, usually being dry, but is sticky when moist. It measures 2 to 10 cm (3/4 to 4 in) in diameter. The gills are decurrent in attachment to the stipe, spaced together rather closely, and whitish, although they often develop a pinkish hue in age.

The stipe is 2 to 8 cm (3/4 to 3 1/8 in) long × 4–15 mm thick and white or sometimes grayish; it may be located off-center or enlarged at the base. The mushroom has a mealy odor, somewhat like cucumber. The spore print is pink. The spores are 9–12 × 5–6.5 μm. Scopoli described it smelling like freshly ground flour.

The variant C. prunulus var. orcellus has a slimy cap and white colors.

=== Chemistry ===
The cucumber odor of this species has been attributed to trans-2-nonenal, which is present at a concentration of 17 μg per gram of crushed tissue. C. prunulus contains the volatile compound 1-octen-3-ol, making it unpalatable to the coastal Pacific Northwest banana slug, Ariolimax columbianus.

=== Similar species ===
The poisonous Clitocybe rivulosa (fool's funnel) looks similar. The miller has pink spores whereas those of the fools funnel are white, the gills of the miller are more easily pulled away, and the miller smells of raw pastry. The miller also prefers woodland whereas fool's funnel is a grassland species.

The poisonous Clitocybe dealbata has a similar cap color, but a white spore print.

Other potential lookalikes include Clitocybe phyllophila, C. subconnexa, Cuphophyllus angustifolius, Leucocybe connata, and L. candicans.

== Distribution and habitat ==
C. prunulus may be found growing on the ground in hardwood and coniferous woods in the summer and autumn.

C. prunulus has been recorded from Varsey Rhododendron Sanctuary in Sikkim, and from under cork oak in Morocco. It is found in Valdaysky National Park in Russia.

A specimen identified as C. cf prunulus collected from Kermandie Track in southern Tasmania was related though basal to other collections of the species.

== Edibility ==
The species is considered edible and choice, but resembles some poisonous species, such as Clitocybe rivulosa.
