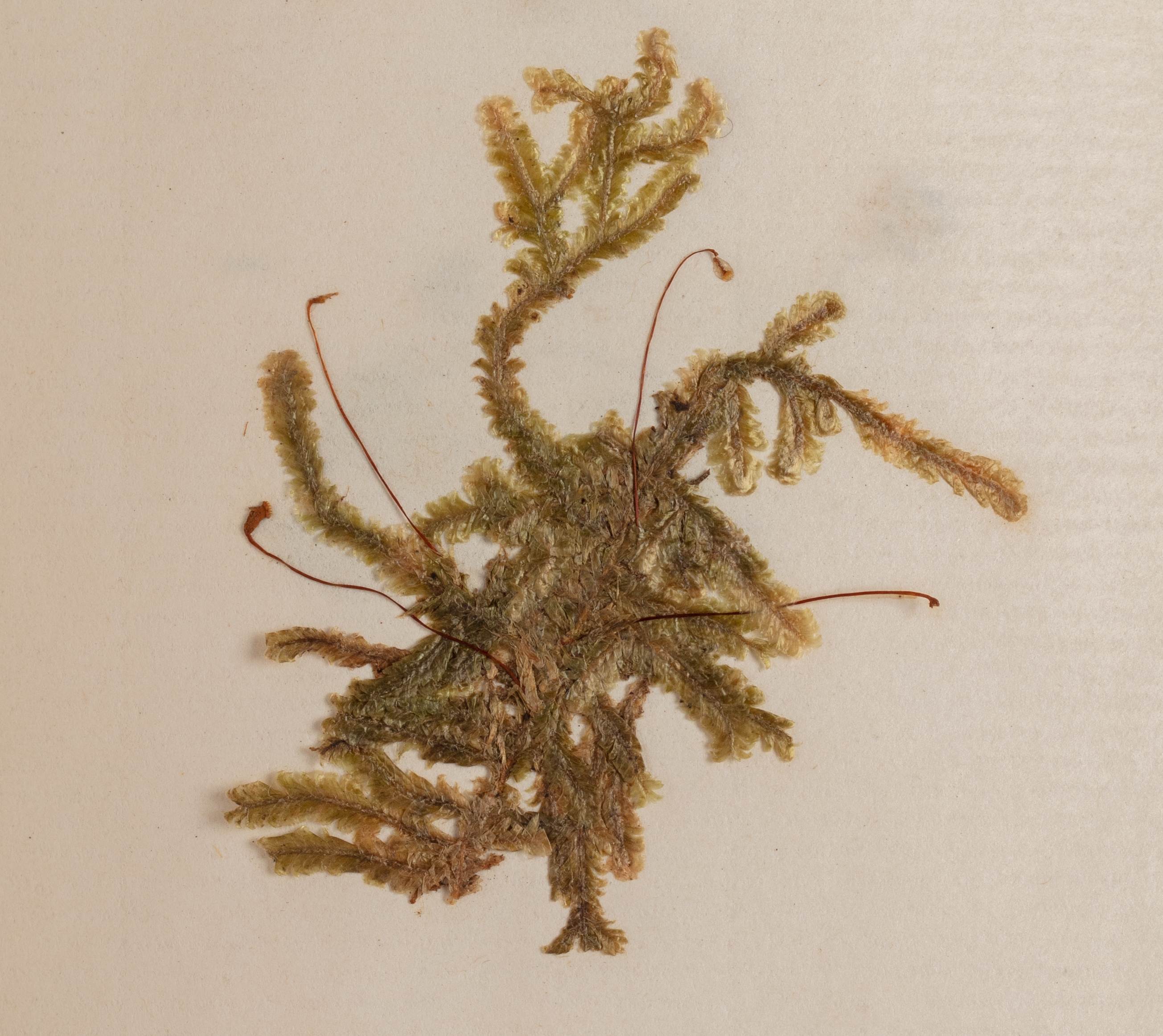
- Pseudotaxiphyllum falcifolium

Scientific classification
- Kingdom: Plantae
- Division: Bryophyta
- Class: Bryopsida
- Subclass: Bryidae
- Order: Hypnales
- Family: Plagiotheciaceae
- Genus: Pseudotaxiphyllum; Z.Iwats.

= Pseudotaxiphyllum =

Genus of mosses

Pseudotaxiphyllum is a genus of mosses belonging to the family Plagiotheciaceae.

The genus has almost cosmopolitan distribution.

Species:

- Pseudotaxiphyllum arquifolium (Bosch & Sande Lac.) Z.Iwats.
- Pseudotaxiphyllum densum Iwatsuki, 1987
