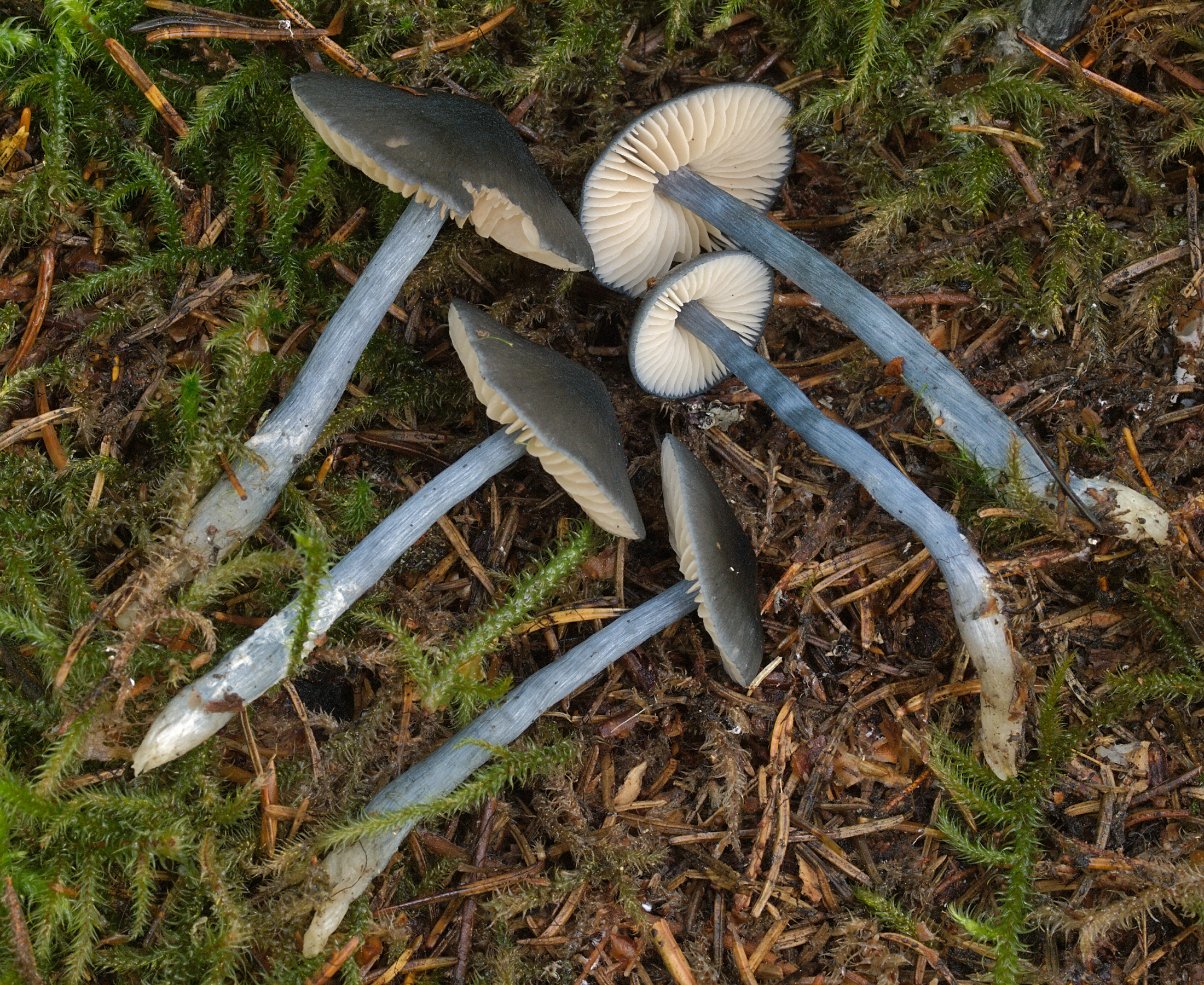
- Entocybe nitida

Scientific classification
- Kingdom: Fungi
- Division: Basidiomycota
- Class: Agaricomycetes
- Order: Agaricales
- Family: Entolomataceae
- Genus: Entocybe; T.J.Baroni, V.Hofstetter & Largent (2011)

Type species
- Entocybe trachyospora (Largent) Largent, T.J.Baroni & V.Hofstetter (2011)

= Entocybe =

Genus of fungi

Entocybe is a genus of agaric fungi in the family Entolomataceae. It was circumscribed in 2011 to contain several former Entoloma species having obscurely angular spores with 6–10 angles (some formerly classified as Rhodocybe). Based on three locus DNA analysis, these species form a distinct, well-defined clade in the Entomolataceae that is basal to Entoloma. The genus name, a combination of Entoloma and Rhodocybe, alludes to similarities with species in those genera. E. melleogrisea, found in a subboreal forest in Québec, Canada, was described as a new species in 2013. Unlike the mostly collybioid fruit bodies of most other Entocybe species, E. melleogrisea has a tricholomatoid stature.

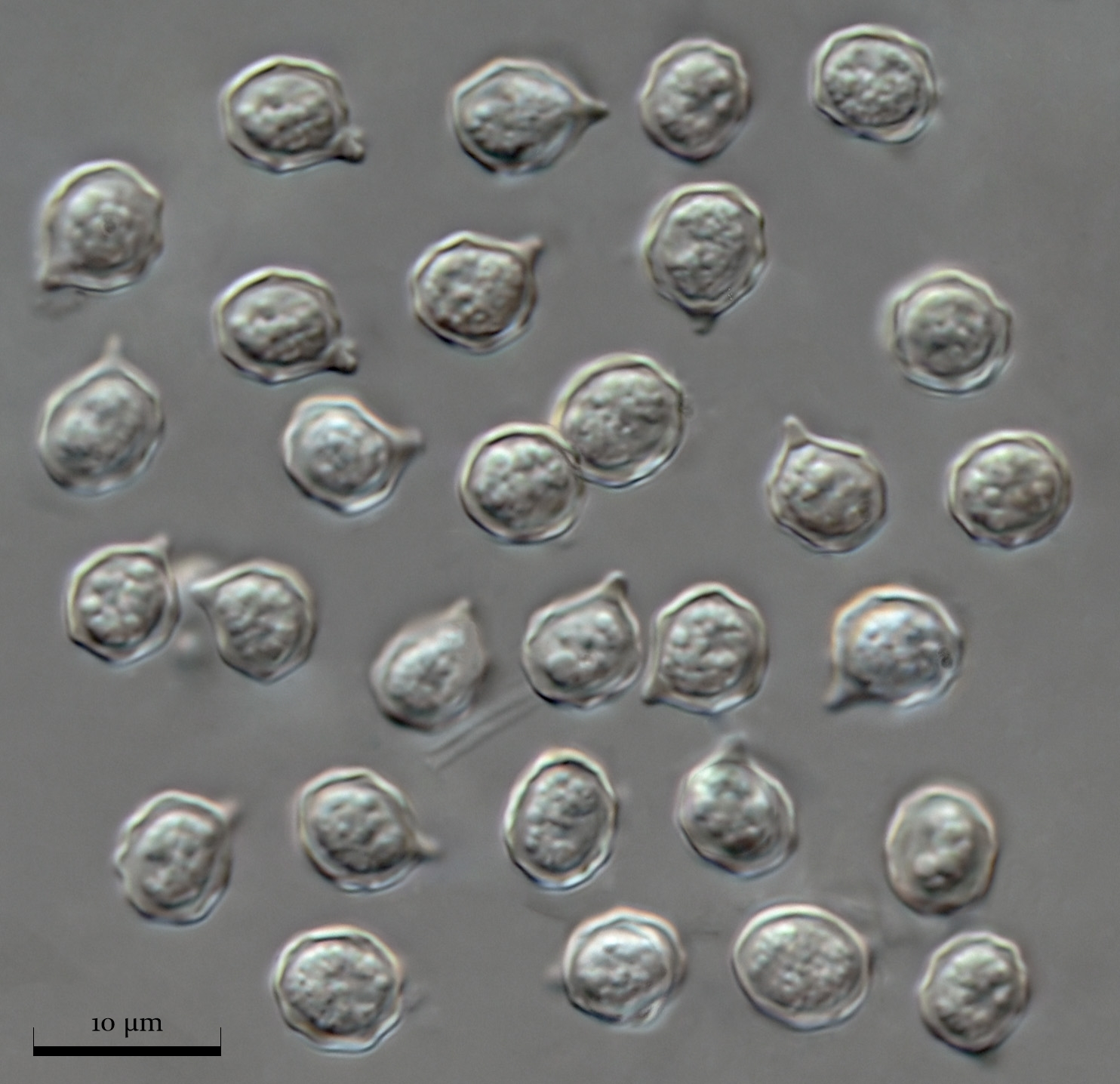
Entocybe tracheospora spores 1000x

== Species ==
- Entocybe haastii
- Entocybe lignicola
- Entocybe melleogrisea
- Entocybe nitida
- Entocybe priscua
- Entocybe pseudoturbida
- Entocybe turbida
- Entocybe speciosa
- Entocybe trachyospora

var. griseoviolacea
var. purpureoviolacea
var. vinacea

- Entocybe vinacea

var. fumosipes
var. violeipes
