= Rhodocybella =

Scientific classification
- Kingdom: Fungi
- Division: Basidiomycota
- Class: Agaricomycetes
- Order: Agaricales
- Family: Entolomataceae
- Genus: Rhodocybella; T.J.Baroni & R.H.Petersen (1987)

Type species
- Rhodocybella rhododendri T.J.Baroni & R.H.Petersen (1987)

Genus of fungi

Rhodocybella is a genus of cyphelloid fungi in the Entolomataceae family. It contains just one known species, Rhodocybella rhododendri, which is found in North America on Rhododendron stems after heavy rain.

The white fruit bodies are mussel-shaped or cup-shaped and are up to 2 mm (0.08 in) across, either with no stipe, or with a very short one, no longer than 1 mm (0.04 in). The fertile inner surface of the fruit body is pinkish and either has no gills at all, or shows only a rudimentary trace of them.

The prefix Rhodo- means "red", cybe means "head", and -ella is a diminutive suffix.

It is not to be confused with Rhodocyphella, which is another small genus of cyphelloid fungi, but which belongs to family Tricholomataceae.
