= Clitopilus amygdaliformis =

Scientific classification
- Domain: Eukaryota
- Kingdom: Fungi
- Division: Basidiomycota
- Class: Agaricomycetes
- Order: Agaricales
- Family: Entolomataceae
- Genus: Clitopilus
- Species: C. amygdaliformis

Binomial name
- Clitopilus amygdaliformis Zhu L. Yang

Species of fungus

Clitopilus amygdaliformis is a species of fungus in the family Entolomataceae native to China, formally described in 2007.
