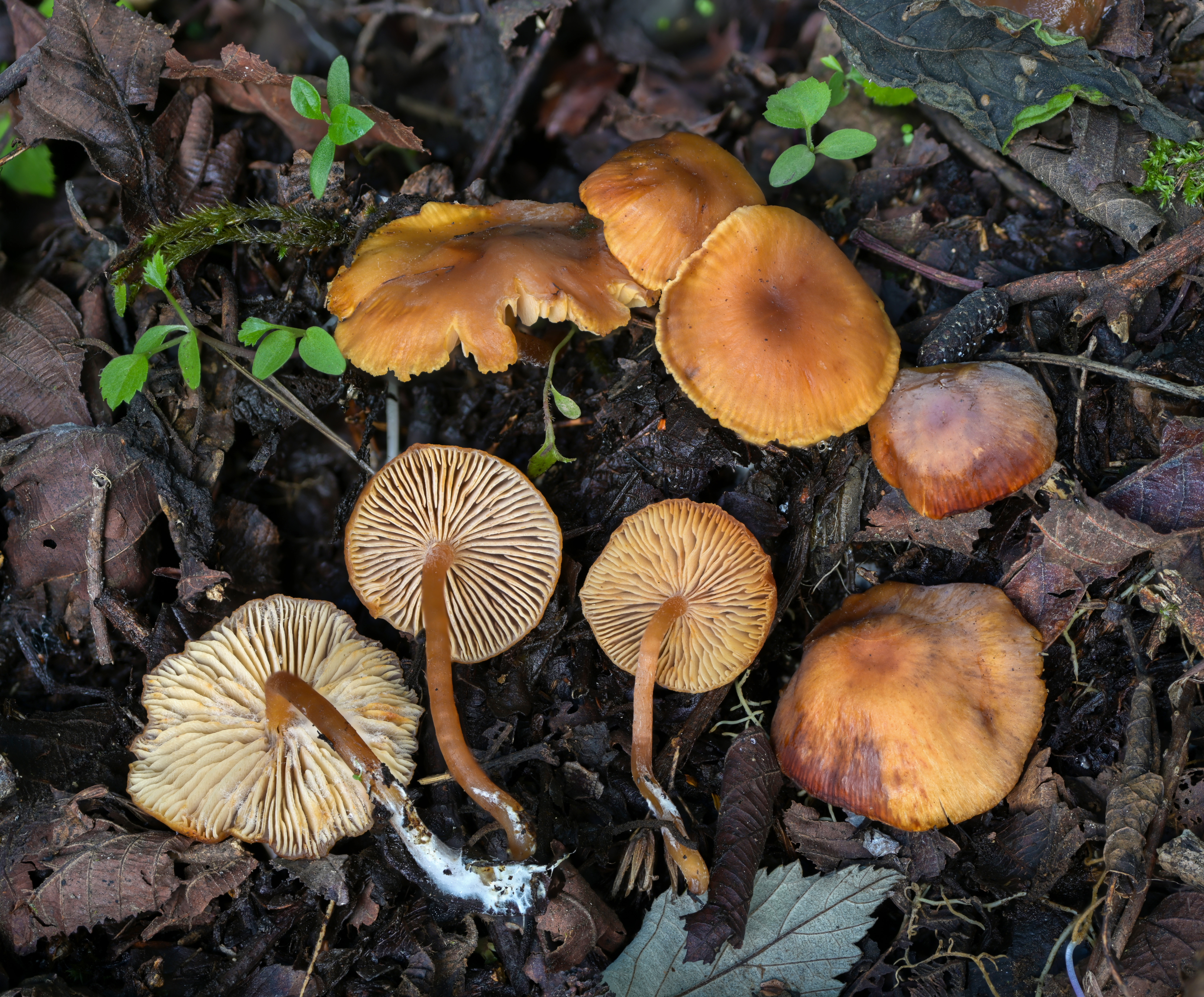
- Rhodophana cf. nitellina

Scientific classification
- Kingdom: Fungi
- Division: Basidiomycota
- Class: Agaricomycetes
- Order: Agaricales
- Family: Entolomataceae
- Genus: Rhodophana; Kühner

Type species
- Rhodophana nitellina (Fr.) Papetti

= Rhodophana =

Genus of fungi

Rhodophana is a genus of mushroom-forming fungi in the family Entolomataceae. It originally described as a genus in 1947 by Robert Kühner, but the description was invalid until it was re-published in 1971, though as a subgenus of Rhodocybe. It did not find favour as a genus until Rhodocybe was found to be polyphyletic and Kluting et al. resurrected the name in 2014 as part of a DNA-based reclassification of the family.

Rhodophana is distinguished from other genera of the Entolomataceae because there are clamp connections and based on the structure of the cap skin. This genus has a thin outer cutis in a single layer merging into the main trama whilst other family members have a two-layer cap skin. The type species is Rhodophana nitellina.

The name is derived from "rhodon" (ῥόδον) = "rose" (referring to the pink colour of the spores and gills) and "phanos" (φανός) = bright or conspicuous (referring to the cap colour).

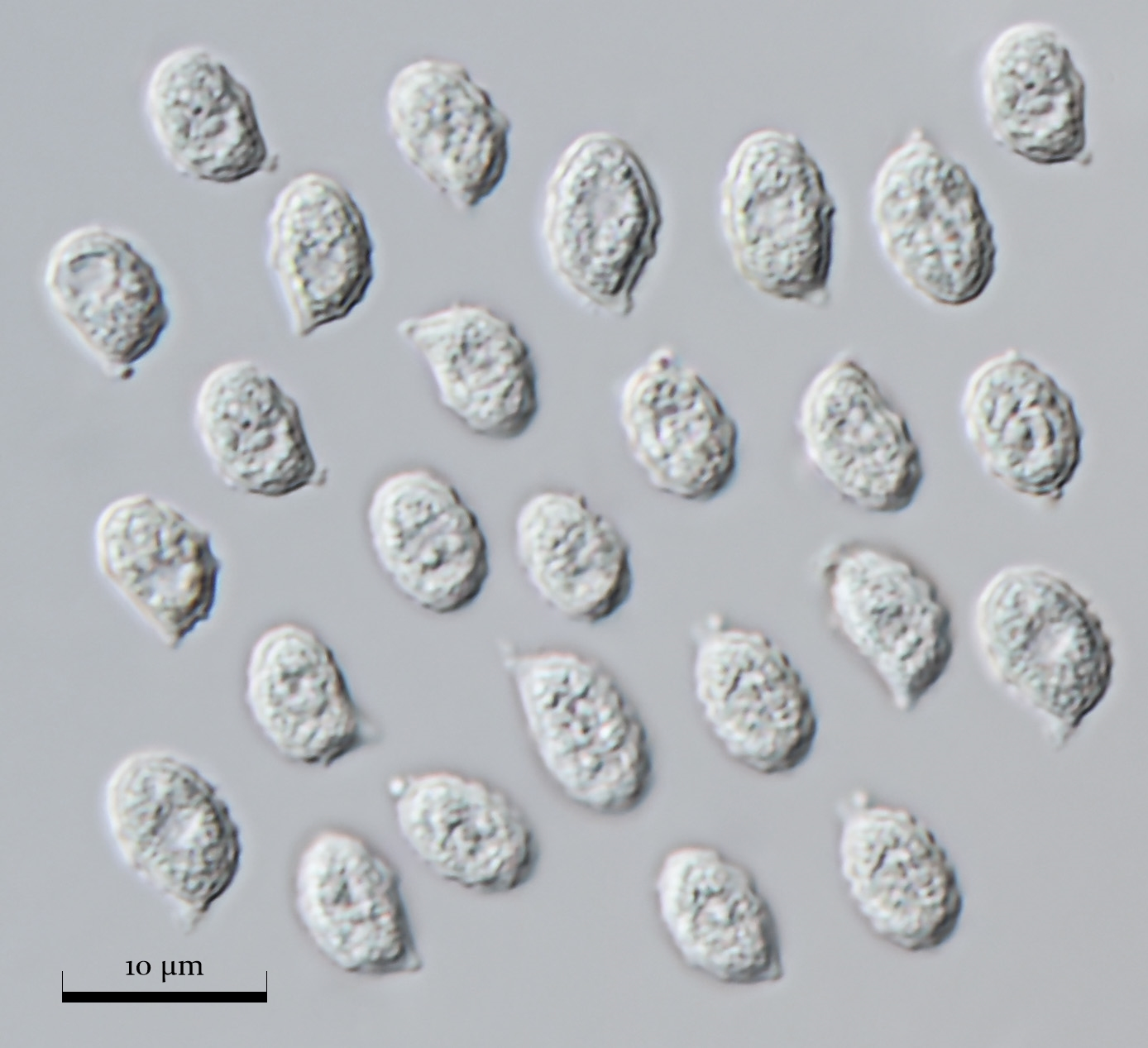
Rhodophana spores 1000x

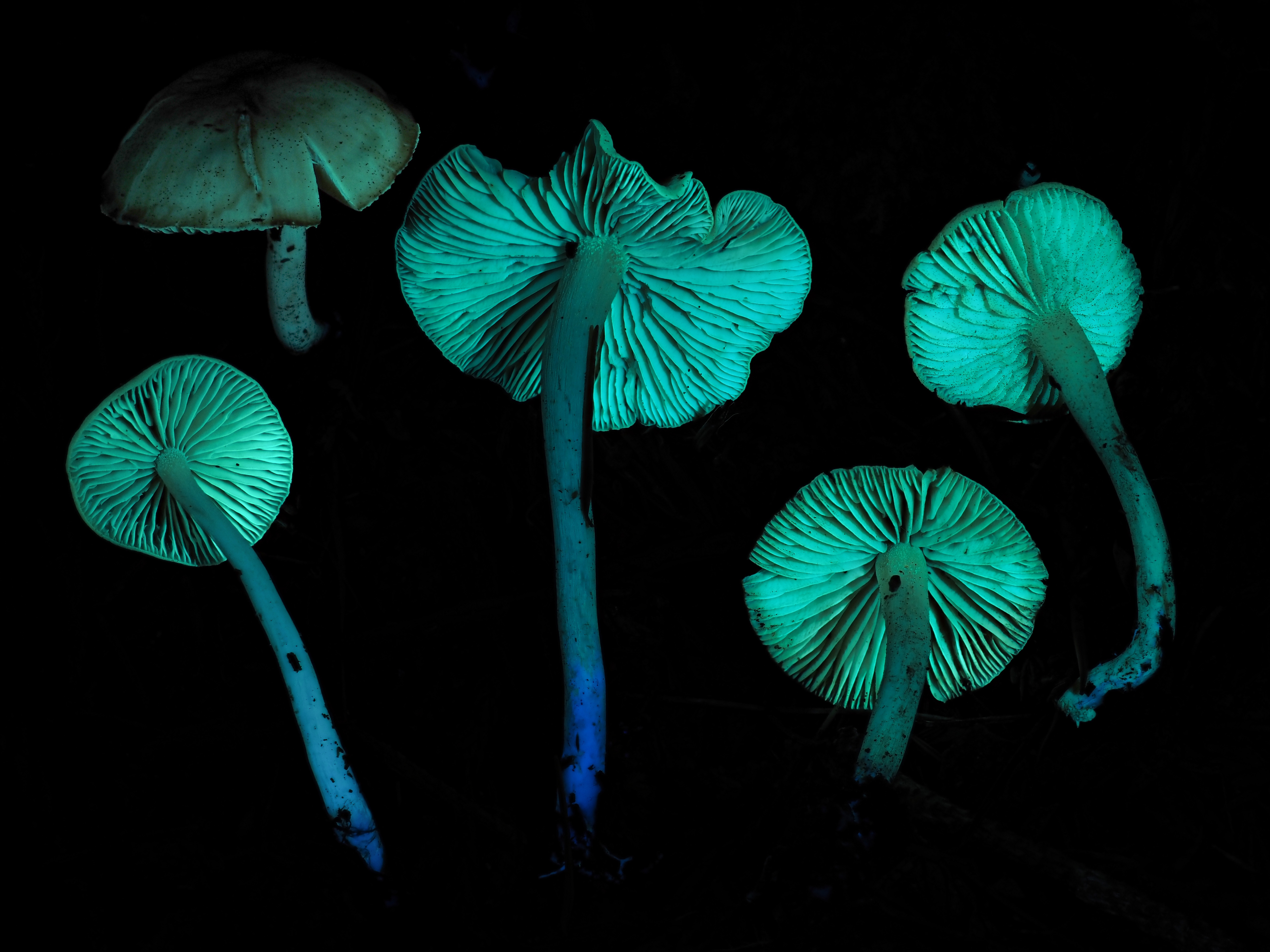
Rhodophana fluorescing in 365 nanometer UV light
