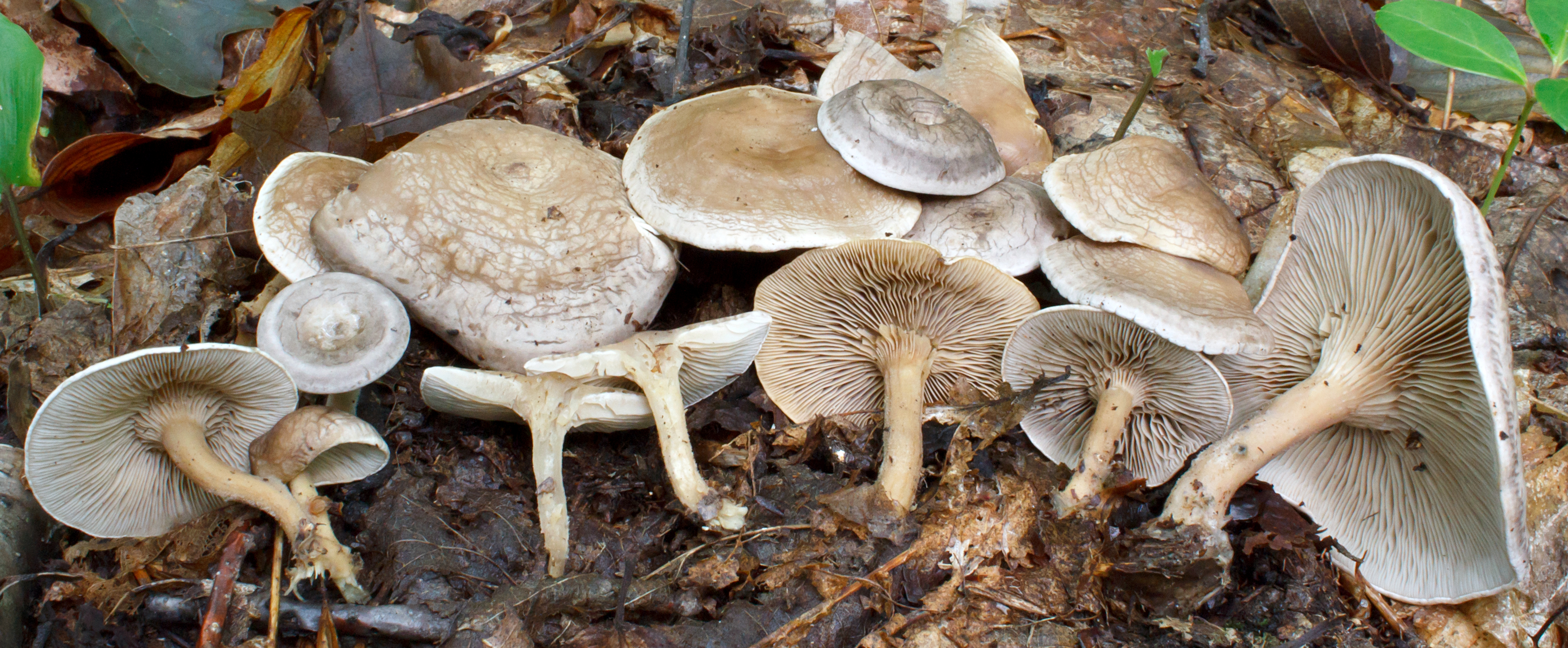
- Clitocella popinalis

Scientific classification
- Kingdom: Fungi
- Division: Basidiomycota
- Class: Agaricomycetes
- Order: Agaricales
- Family: Entolomataceae
- Genus: Clitocella; K.L.Kluting, T.J.Baroni & S.E.Bergemann (2014)

Type species
- Clitocella popinalis (Fr.) K.L.Kluting, T.J.Baroni & S.E.Bergemann (2014)

Species
- Clitocella fallax Clitocella mundula Clitocella popinalis

= Clitocella =

Genus of fungi

Clitocella is a genus of mushroom-forming fungi in the family Entolomataceae. It was circumscribed in 2014 with Clitocella popinalis as the type species. The generic name refers to its similarities and close relationship to the genera Clitopilus and Clitopilopsis; the Latin word cella, meaning "storage place", alludes to "taxa not belonging to Clitopilus or Clitopilopsis". Species have caps with centrally placed stipes; the gills are decurrent, and crowded closely together with a smooth edge. Mushrooms produce a pink spore print. The spores have thin walls (less than or equal to 0.5 μm) that are cyanophilic (absorbing blue stain) and surfaces ornamented with minute bumps that can be seen in profile and face views. This surface ornamentation distinguishes Clitocella from Clitopilus, which has longitudinally ridged spores. Clitopilopsis, in contrast, has thicker spore walls (greater than or equal to 0.5 μm).
