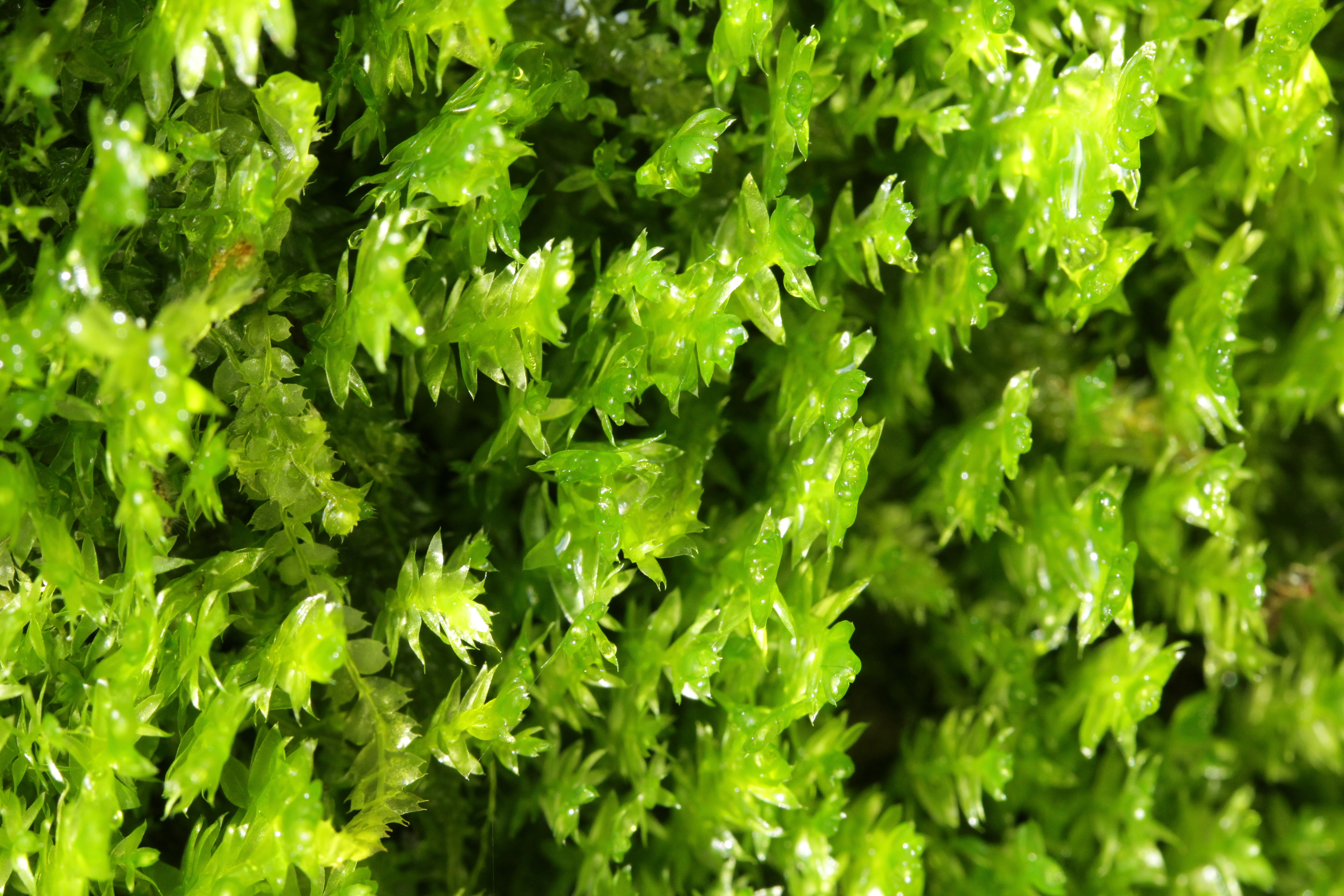
- Plagiothecium succulentum

Scientific classification
- Kingdom: Plantae
- Division: Bryophyta
- Class: Bryopsida
- Subclass: Bryidae
- Order: Hypnales
- Family: Plagiotheciaceae
- Genus: Plagiothecium; Bruch & Schimp.

Synonyms
- Buckiella Ireland; Rectithecium Hedenäs & Huttunen

= Plagiothecium =

Genus of mosses

Plagiothecium is a genus of moss belonging to the family Plagiotheciaceae. It has a cosmopolitan distribution.

== Species ==
The following species are recognised in the genus Plagiothecium:

- Plagiothecium acuminatum Venturi
- Plagiothecium albescens (Warnst.) Jedl.
- Plagiothecium albulum (Müll.Hal.) Kindb.
- Plagiothecium alpinum (Kern) Jedl.
- Plagiothecium aptychopsis (Müll.Hal.) Kindb.
- Plagiothecium argentatum (Mitt.) Q.Zuo
- Plagiothecium arnoldii Milde
- Plagiothecium auritum (Kern) Jedl.
- Plagiothecium austrodenticulatum Renauld & Cardot
- Plagiothecium austropulchellum (Müll.Hal.) Kindb.
- Plagiothecium berggrenianum Frisvoll, 1981
- Plagiothecium bicolor Warnstorf, 1915
- Plagiothecium cacti (Müll.Hal.) Kindb.
- Plagiothecium cavifolium Iwatsuki, 1970
- Plagiothecium ceylonense Brotherus ex Dixon, 1915
- Plagiothecium chapmannii (Duby) A.Jaeger
- Plagiothecium chrismarii (Müll.Hal.) Besch.
- Plagiothecium cochleatum Dixon, 1938
- Plagiothecium cordifolium Lazarenko, 1945
- Plagiothecium corticola Ångström, 1873
- Plagiothecium curvifolium Schliephacke ex Limpricht, 1897
- Plagiothecium dehradunense Vohra, 1974
- Plagiothecium densifolium (Lindb. ex Broth.) Limpr.
- Plagiothecium denticulatum W.P.Schimper, 1851
- Plagiothecium deplanatum (Bruch & Schimp. ex Sull.) Spruce
- Plagiothecium doii Sakurai
- Plagiothecium drepanophyllum Renauld & Cardot, 1905
- Plagiothecium enerve (Broth.) Q.Zuo
- Plagiothecium entodontella Brotherus ex Dixon, 1935
- Plagiothecium euryphyllum Iwatsuki, 1970
- Plagiothecium eutrypherum (Müll.Hal.) Kindb.
- Plagiothecium falklandicum Newton, 1985
- Plagiothecium fitzgeraldii (Renauld) Renauld & Cardot
- Plagiothecium formosicum Brotherus & A.Yasuda, 1926
- Plagiothecium fuegianum (Besch.) Dusén
- Plagiothecium geminum (Mitt.) A.Jaeger
- Plagiothecium geophilum (Austin) Grout
- Plagiothecium georgicoantarcticum Kindberg, 1891
- Plagiothecium glossophylloides Brotherus, 1929
- Plagiothecium gracile (Jedl.) Jedl.
- Plagiothecium handelii Brotherus, 1929
- Plagiothecium helveticum Jedl.
- Plagiothecium herzogii Thériot, 1932
- Plagiothecium incurvatum (Schrad. ex Brid.) De Not.
- Plagiothecium javense (M.Fleisch.) Sakurai
- Plagiothecium laetum W.P.Schimper, 1851
- Plagiothecium laevigatum Schimp. ex Besch.
- Plagiothecium lamprostachys Jaeger, 1878
- Plagiothecium lancifolium Debeaux, 1876
- Plagiothecium latebricola W.P.Schimper, 1851
- Plagiothecium lonchochaete C.Müller, 1901
- Plagiothecium lonchochaete Müll.Hal.
- Plagiothecium longisetulum Müll.Hal.
- Plagiothecium lucidum Paris, 1897
- Plagiothecium luridum (Molendo) Molendo & Lorentz
- Plagiothecium matsumurae S.Okamura
- Plagiothecium mauiense Brotherus, 1927
- Plagiothecium membranosulum C.Müller, 1899
- Plagiothecium membranosulum Müll.Hal.
- Plagiothecium microsphaerothecium Herzog
- Plagiothecium mildbraedii Brotherus, 1910
- Plagiothecium mollicaule R.S.Williams
- Plagiothecium monbuttoviae Jaeger, 1878
- Plagiothecium myurum (Cardot & Thér.) Jedl.
- Plagiothecium nanoglobum (Müll.Hal.) Kindb.
- Plagiothecium neckeroideum W.P.Schimper, 1851
- Plagiothecium nemorale Jaeger, 1878
- Plagiothecium nitens Dixon, 1916
- Plagiothecium nitidifolium Jaeger, 1878
- Plagiothecium noricum Molendo ex Limpricht, 1897
- Plagiothecium novae-valesiae Broth.
- Plagiothecium novogranatense Mitten, 1869
- Plagiothecium obtusissimum Brotherus, 1921
- Plagiothecium orthocarpum Mitten, 1869
- Plagiothecium ovalifolium Cardot, 1905
- Plagiothecium paleaceum Jaeger, 1878
- Plagiothecium perminutum Dixon, 1930
- Plagiothecium piliferum W.P.Schimper, 1851
- Plagiothecium pilosum Broth. & M.Yasuda
- Plagiothecium planissimum (Mitt.) E.B.Bartram
- Plagiothecium platycladum (Cardot) Broth.
- Plagiothecium platyphyllum Mönkemeyer, 1927
- Plagiothecium podperae (Jedl.) Jedl.
- Plagiothecium pseudolaetum (Meyl.) Meyl.
- Plagiothecium regnellii Ångström
- Plagiothecium rhynchostegioides C.Müller, 1899
- Plagiothecium robustum (Hook.) A.Jaeger
- Plagiothecium rossicum Ignatov & Ignatova
- Plagiothecium sakuraii Reimers
- Plagiothecium sandbergii Renauld & Cardot
- Plagiothecium sandwicense (Hook. & Arn.) A.Jaeger
- Plagiothecium scalpellifolium (Müll.Hal.) E.B.Bartram
- Plagiothecium schofieldii G.J.Wolski & W.R.Buck, 2021
- Plagiothecium seligeri (Brid.) Lindb.
- Plagiothecium shevockii S.He
- Plagiothecium shinii Sakurai, 1941
- Plagiothecium splendescens Müll.Hal.
- Plagiothecium standleyi E.B.Bartram
- Plagiothecium strenuum (Jedl.) Jedl.
- Plagiothecium subdentatum (Jedl.) Jedl.
- Plagiothecium subglaucum Thwaites & Mitten, 1873
- Plagiothecium subjulaceum (Meyl.) Jedl.
- Plagiothecium sublaetum (Lindb.) Lindb.
- Plagiothecium submollicaule Broth. ex Herzog
- Plagiothecium subpinnatum E.S.Salmon
- Plagiothecium subsimplex (Hedw.) Besch.
- Plagiothecium subteres (Jedl.) Jedl.
- Plagiothecium subulatum Brotherus, 1924
- Plagiothecium succulentum Lindberg, 1865
- Plagiothecium svalbardense Frisvoll
- Plagiothecium svihlae E.B.Bartram, 1954
- Plagiothecium tenellum (Schimp.) Jedl.
- Plagiothecium tenerum (Sw.) Kindb.
- Plagiothecium tjuzenii Iishiba, 1932
- Plagiothecium tjuzenii Iisiba
- Plagiothecium tosaense Broth.
- Plagiothecium uematsui Broth.
- Plagiothecium undulatum (Hedw.) Schimp.
- Plagiothecium unilaterale Müll.Hal.
- Plagiothecium vesiculariopsis Dixon & Potier de la Varde, 1927
- Plagiothecium vulgare (Mönk.) Jedl.
- Plagiothecium yasudae Broth.
- Plagiothecium zerovii (Lazarenko) Q.Zuo
