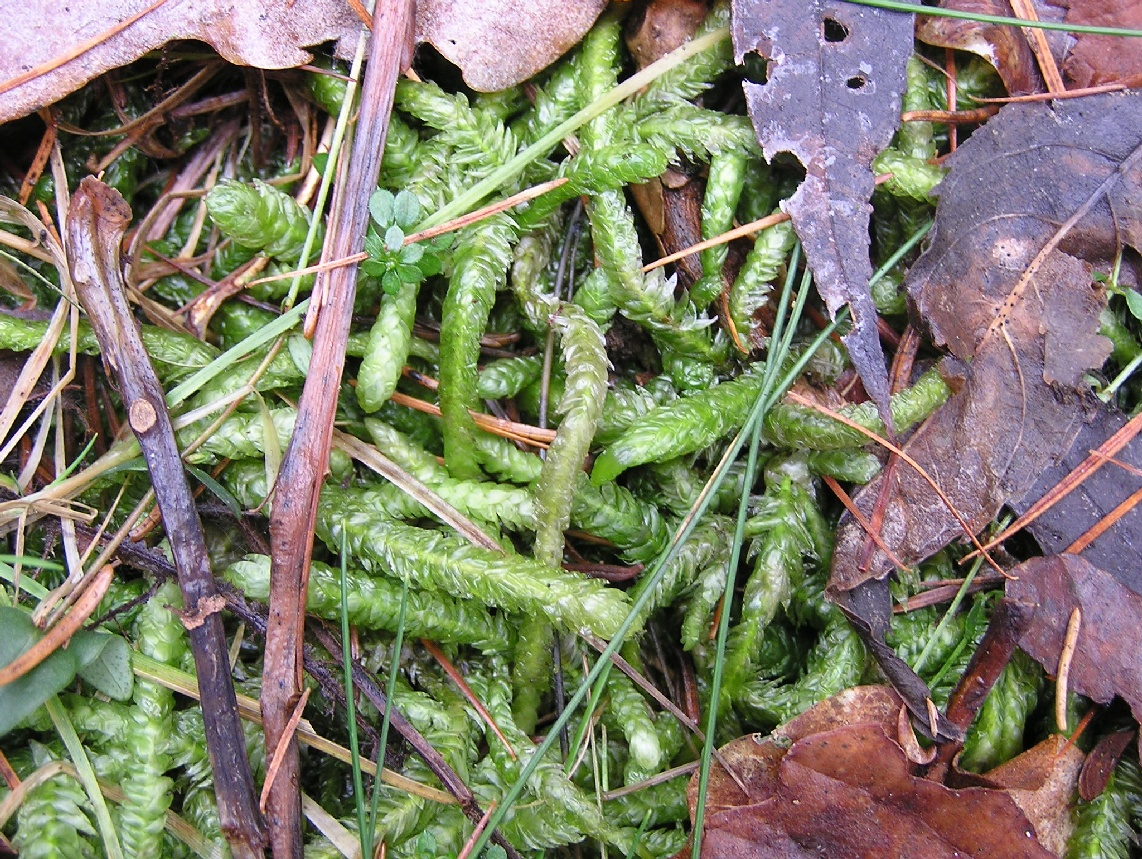
- Plagiothecium undulatum

Scientific classification
- Kingdom: Plantae
- Division: Bryophyta
- Class: Bryopsida
- Subclass: Bryidae
- Order: Hypnales
- Family: Plagiotheciaceae; Fleischer and Broth.

Genera
- See text

= Plagiotheciaceae =

Family of mosses

Plagiotheciaceae is a family of mosses from the order Hypnales. It is found almost nearly worldwide, including Antarctica. Located primarily in temperate latitudes and at higher elevations in the tropics.

Named after Plagiothecium, which has over 150 species.

It originally had 2 subfamilies, Plagiothecioideae (which contained Catagonium and Plagiothecium), and Stereophylloideae (which contained Entodontopsis, Pilosium, Stenocarpidopsis, Stenocarpidium and Sterephyllum).

== Genera ==
As accepted by GBIF;

- Acrocladiopsis (V.F.Brotherus) J.Cardot, 1914
- Bardunovia Ignatov & Ochyra
- Complanato-Hypnum Hampe, 1878
- Isocladiella Dixon
- Isopterygiella Ignatov & Ignatova, 2020
- Isopterygiopsis Z.Iwats.
- Ortholimnobium Dixon
- Pilaisaea
- Plagiotheciella M.Fleisch. ex Broth.
- Plagiothecium Bruch & Schimp.
- Pseudotaxiphyllum Z.Iwats.
- Saviczia A.L.Abramova & J.J.Abramov, 1966
- Sharpiella Z.Iwats.

== Other sources ==
- Buck, W. R. and R. R. Ireland. 1985. A reclassification of the Plagiotheciaceae. Nova Hedwigia 41: 89–125.
