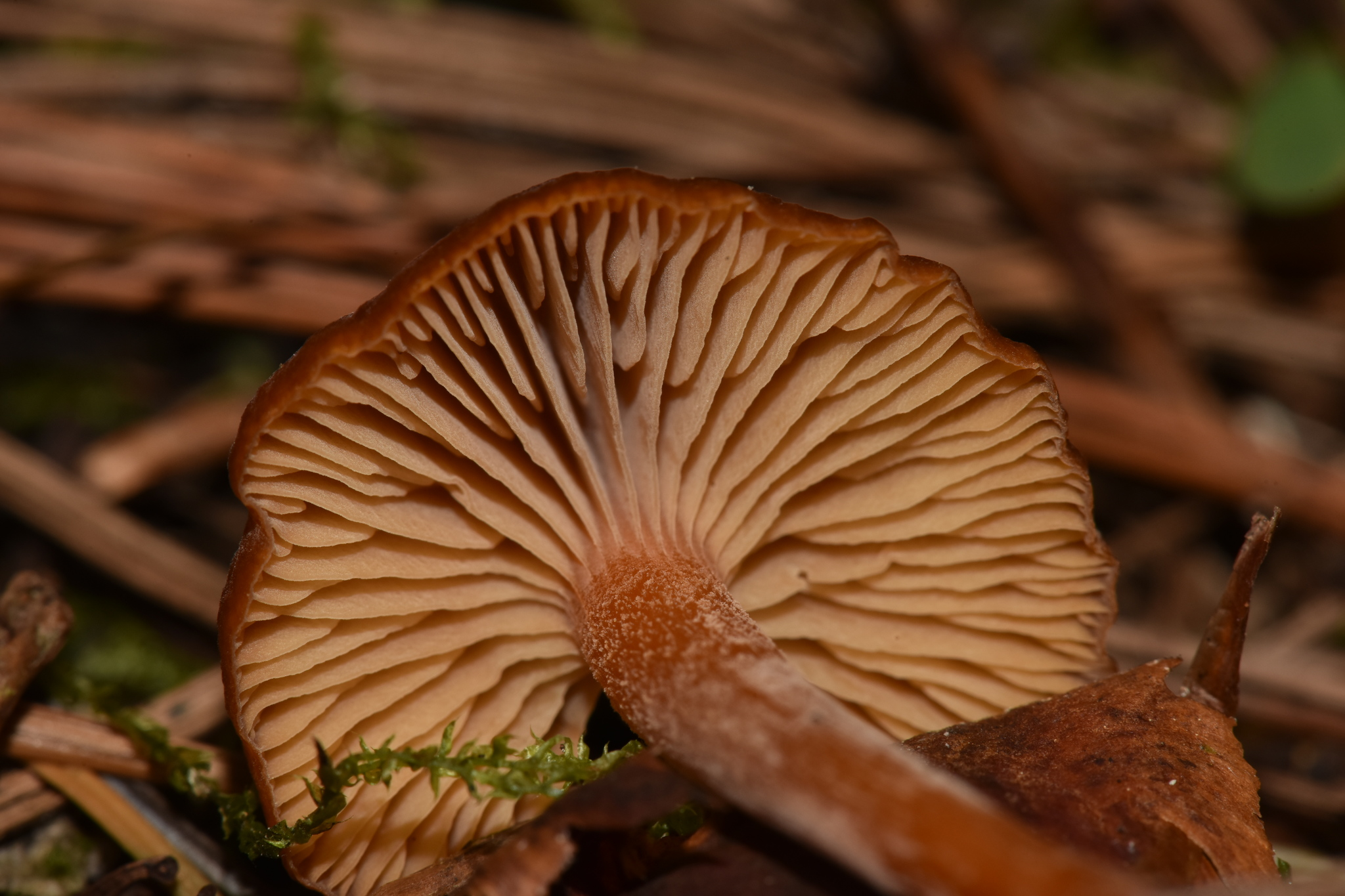

Scientific classification
- Kingdom: Fungi
- Division: Basidiomycota
- Class: Agaricomycetes
- Order: Agaricales
- Family: Entolomataceae
- Genus: Rhodophana
- Species: R. nitellina

Binomial name
- Rhodophana nitellina (Fr.) Papetti

Synonyms
- Rhodocybe nitellina (Fr.) Singer; Clitopilus nitellinus (Fr.) Noordel. & Co-David

= Rhodophana nitellina =

Species of fungus

Rhodophana nitellina
- Mycological characteristics
- Gills on hymenium
- Cap is convex or flat
- Hymenium is adnexed
- Stipe is bare
- Spore print is pinkish-brown
- Edibility is unknown

Rhodophana nitellina, commonly known as the cucumber pinkgill, is a species of mushroom in the family Entolomataceae. It is found in California and the Pacific Northwest.

== Description ==
The cap of Rhodophana nitellina is orange to reddish and hygrophanous. It can be convex, flat, or depressed, and is about 2-6 centimeters in diameter. The gills start out creamy in color and darken as the mushroom matures. They can be adnexed or notched. The stipe is the same color as the cap and is about 2-5 centimeters long and 2-5 millimeters wide. The spore print is pinkish tan. This mushroom smells farinaceous or cucumber-like.

== Habitat and ecology ==
Rhodophana nitellina is found under western redcedar and other conifers and fruits during fall.
