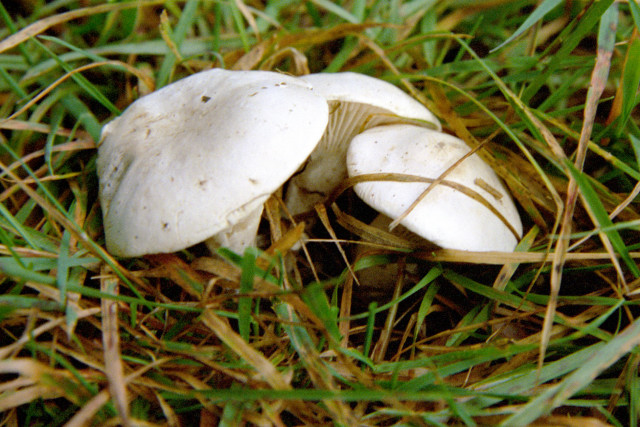
- Clitopilus prunulus

Scientific classification
- Kingdom: Fungi
- Division: Basidiomycota
- Class: Agaricomycetes
- Order: Agaricales
- Family: Entolomataceae
- Genus: Clitopilus (Fr. ex Rabenh.) P.Kumm. (1871)

Type species
- Clitopilus prunulus (Scop.) P.Kumm. (1871)

Synonyms
- Orcella Battarra (1755); Agaricus subgen. Clitopilus Fr. ex Rabenh. (1844); Hexajuga Fayod (1889); Orcella Battarra ex Clem. (1896); Paxillopsis J.E.Lange (1940)

= Clitopilus =

Genus of fungi

Clitopilus is a genus of fungi in the family Entolomataceae. The genus has a widespread distribution, especially in northern temperate areas. Although a 2008 estimate suggested about 30 species in the genus, a more recent publication (2009) using molecular phylogenetics has redefined the genus to include many former Rhodocybe species.

== Species ==
- Clitopilus acerbus Noordel. & Co-David
- Clitopilus albovelutinus (G. Stev.) Noordel. & Co-David
- Clitopilus alutaceus (Singer) Noordel. & Co-David
- Clitopilus amarellus (Cons., D. Antonini, M. Antonini & Contu) Noordel. & Co-David
- Clitopilus amygdaliformis Zhu L. Yang
- Clitopilus angustisporus (Singer) Noordel. & Co-David
- Clitopilus ardosiacus (E. Horak & Griesser) Noordel. & Co-David
- Clitopilus aureicystidiatus (Lennox ex T.J. Baroni) Noordel. & Co-David
- Clitopilus australis (Singer) Noordel. & Co-David
- Clitopilus azalearum (Murrill) Noordel. & Co-David
- Clitopilus balearicus (Courtec. & Siquier) Noordel. & Co-David
- Clitopilus brunneus (Contu) Noordel. & Co-David
- Clitopilus brunnescens (T.J. Baroni & E. Horak) Noordel. & Co-David
- Clitopilus byssisedoides Gminder, Noordel. & Co-David
- Clitopilus caelatoideus (Dennis) Noordel. & Co-David
- Clitopilus carlottae (Redhead & T.J. Baroni) Noordel. & Co-David
- Clitopilus cedretorum (Bidaud & Cavet) Noordel. & Co-David
- Clitopilus claudopus (Singer ex T.J. Baroni) Noordel. & Co-David
- Clitopilus collybioides (Singer) Noordel. & Co-David
- Clitopilus conchatus (E. Horak) Noordel. & Co-David
- Clitopilus conicus (Singer) Noordel. & Co-David
- Clitopilus crepidotoides (Singer) Noordel. & Co-David
- Clitopilus cretatus (Berk. & Br.)
- Clitopilus cretoalbus A.Izhar, Zaman, M.Asif, H.Bashir, Niazi & Khalid
- Clitopilus crystallinus (T.J. Baroni) Noordel. & Co-David
- Clitopilus cupressicola (Carassai, Papa & Contu) Noordel. & Co-David
- Clitopilus cyathiformis (Corner & E. Horak) Noordel. & Co-David
- Clitopilus densifolius (T.J. Baroni & Ovrebo) Noordel. & Co-David
- Clitopilus dingleyae (E. Horak) Noordel. & Co-David
- Clitopilus eccentricus (T.J. Baroni & Ovrebo) Noordel. & Co-David
- Clitopilus fibulata (Pegler) Noordel. & Co-David
- Clitopilus finnmarchiae (Noordel.) Noordel. & Co-David
- Clitopilus fuligineus (E. Horak) Noordel. & Co-David
- Clitopilus fuscofarinaceus (Kosonen & Noordel.) Noordel. & Co-David
- Clitopilus galerinoides (Singer) Noordel. & Co-David
- Clitopilus geminus (Fr.) Noordel. & Co-David
- Clitopilus gibbosus (E. Horak) Noordel. & Co-David
- Clitopilus griseolus (T.J. Baroni & Halling) Noordel. & Co-David
- Clitopilus griseosporus (A. Pearson) Noordel. & Co-David
- Clitopilus hawaiiensis (Singer) Noordel. & Co-David
- Clitopilus heterosporus (Murrill) Noordel. & Co-David
- Clitopilus himantiigenus (Speg.) Noordel. & Co-David
- Clitopilus hispanicus (Esteve-Rav. & G. Moreno) Noordel. & Co-David
- Clitopus hobsonii (Berk.) P.D.Orton
- Clitopilus hondensis (Murrill) Noordel. & Co-David
- Clitopilus horakii (Pacioni & Lalli) Noordel. & Co-David
- Clitopilus hygrophoroides (T.J. Baroni & Halling) Noordel. & Co-David
- Clitopilus ilicicola (Lonati) Noordel. & Co-David
- Clitopilus incarnatus (T.J. Baroni & Halling) Noordel. & Co-David
- Clitopilus iti (E. Horak) Noordel. & Co-David
- Clitopilus lactariiformis (Singer) Noordel. & Co-David
- Clitopilus laetus (Singer) Noordel. & Co-David
- Clitopilus lateralipes (E. Horak) Noordel. & Co-David
- Clitopilus lateritius (T.J. Baroni & G.M. Gates) Noordel. & Co-David
- Clitopilus luteocinnamomeus (T.J. Baroni & Ovrebo) Noordel. & Co-David
- Clitopilus lutetianus (E.-J. Gilbert ) Noordel. & Co-David
- Clitopilus mairei (T.J. Baroni) Noordel. & Co-David
- Clitopilus maleolens (E. Horak) Noordel. & Co-David
- Clitopilus marasmioides (Singer) Noordel. & Co-David
- Clitopilus melleus (T.J. Baroni & Ovrebo) Noordel. & Co-David
- Clitopilus melleopallens (P.D. Orton) Noordel. & Co-David
- Clitopilus mordax (G.F. Atk.) Noordel. & Co-David
- Clitopilus multilamellatus (E. Horak) Noordel. & Co-David
- Clitopilus muritai (G. Stev.) Noordel. & Co-David
- Clitopilus mustellinus (E. Horak) Noordel. & Co-David
- Clitopilus mycenoides (Singer) Noordel. & Co-David
- Clitopilus naucoria (Singer) Noordel. & Co-David
- Clitopilus nitellinus (Fr.) Noordel. & Co-David
- Clitopilus nitellinoides (E. Horak) Noordel. & Co-David
- Clitopilus nuciolens (Murrill) Noordel. & Co-David
- Clitopilus obscurus (Pilát) Noordel. & Co-David
- Clitopilus obtusatulus (E. Horak) Noordel. & Co-David
- Clitopilus ochraceopallidus (Ballero & Contu) Noordel. & Co-David
- Clitopilus pallens (E. Horak) Noordel. & Co-David
- Clitopilus pallidogriseus (T.J. Baroni & G.M. Gates) Noordel. & Co-David
- Clitopilus parilis var. wagramensis (Hauskn. & Noordel.) Noordel. & Co-David
- Clitopilus passeckerianus (Pilát) Singer
- Clitopilus paurii (T.J. Baroni, Moncalvo, R.P. Bhatt & S.L. Stephenson) Noordel. & Co-David
- Clitopilus peculiaris (Contu & Bon) Noordel. & Co-David
- Clitopilus pegleri (T.J. Baroni) Noordel. & Co-David
- Clitopilus perplexus (T.J. Baroni & Watling) Noordel. & Co-David
- Clitopilus perstriatus (Corner & E. Horak) Noordel. & Co-David
- Clitopilus piperatus (G. Stev.) Noordel. & Co-David
- Clitopilus pleurogenus (Pegler) Noordel. & Co-David
- Clitopilus porcelanicus (Dennis) Noordel. & Co-David
- Clitopilus praesidentialis (Cons., Contu, M. Roy, Selosse & Vizzini) Noordel. & Co-David
- Clitopilus priscuus (T.J. Baroni) Noordel. & Co-David
- Clitopilus prunulus (Scop.) P. Kumm.
- Clitopilus pseudonitellinus (Dennis) Noordel. & Co-David
- Clitopilus pseudopiperitus (T.J. Baroni & G.M. Gates) Noordel. & Co-David
- Clitopilus pulchrispermus (T.J. Baroni & Halling) Noordel. & Co-David
- Clitopilus radicatus (Cleland) Noordel. & Co-David
- Clitopilus reticulatus (Cleland) Noordel. & Co-David
- Clitopilus rhizogenus (T.J. Baroni & E. Horak) Noordel. & Co-David
- Clitopilus russularia (Singer) Noordel. & Co-David
- Clitopilus semiarboricola (T.J. Baroni) Noordel. & Co-David
- Clitopilus stanglianus (Bresinsky & Pfaff) Noordel. & Co-David
- Clitopilus stipitatus (A.H. Sm. & Hesler) Noordel. & Co-David
- Clitopilus subcaespitosus (Esteve-Rav.) Noordel. & Co-David
- Clitopilus tasmanicus (T.J. Baroni & G.M. Gates) Noordel. & Co-David
- Clitopilus tergipes (Corner & E. Horak) Noordel. & Co-David
- Clitopilus testaceus (Dennis) Noordel. & Co-David
- Clitopilus tillii (Krisai & Noordel.) Noordel. & Co-David
- Clitopilus umbrosus (T.J. Baroni & Halling) Noordel. & Co-David
- Clitopilus variisporus (Voto) Noordel. & Co-David
- Clitopilus vernalis Har. Takah. & Degawa 2011 – Japan
- Clitopilus verrucosus (Thiers) Noordel. & Co-David
- Clitopilus villosus (E. Horak) Noordel. & Co-David
