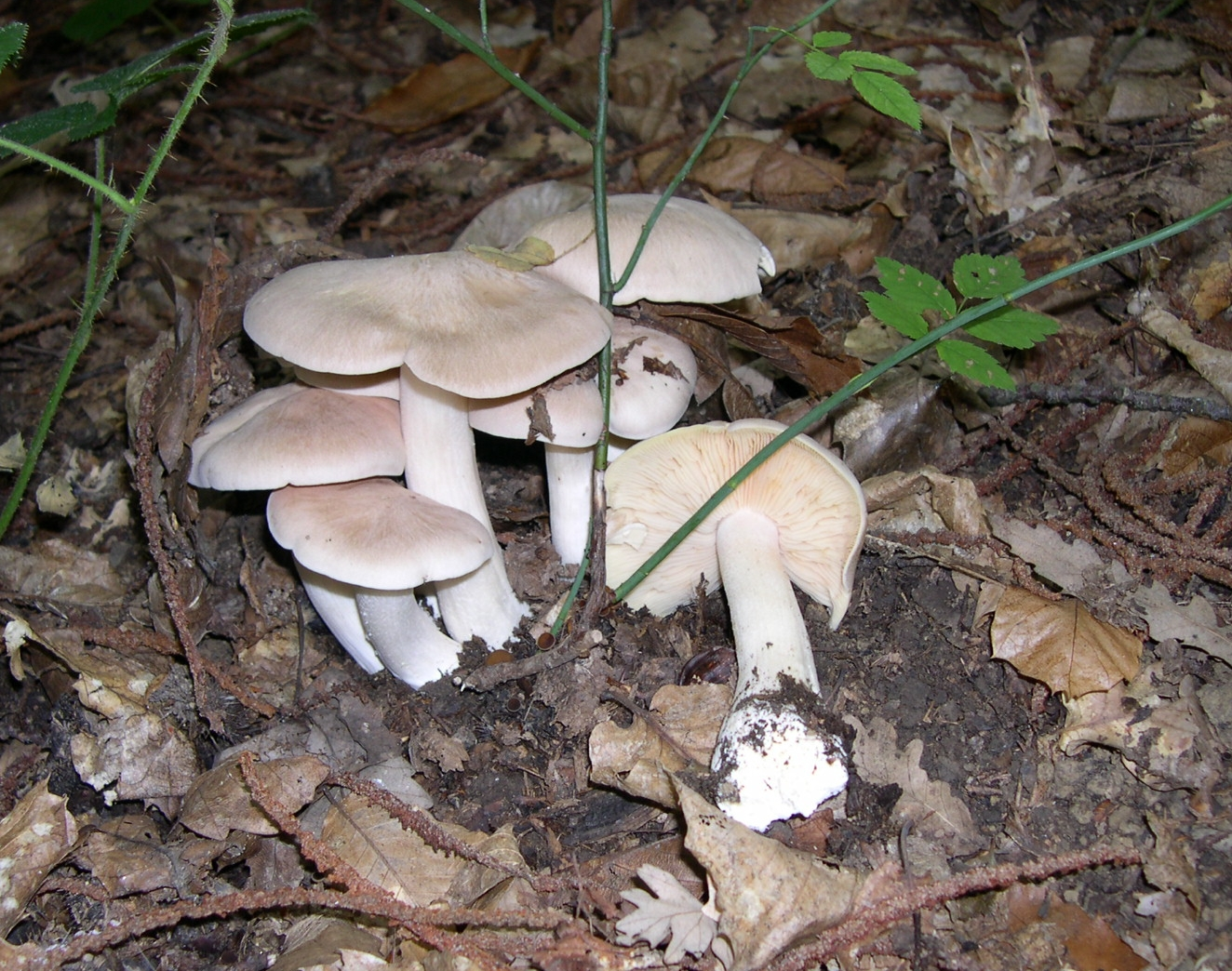
- Entoloma sinuatum, Italy

Scientific classification
- Kingdom: Fungi
- Division: Basidiomycota
- Class: Agaricomycetes
- Order: Agaricales
- Suborder: Tricholomatineae
- Family: Entolomataceae; Kotl. & Pouzar (1972)

Type genus
- Entoloma (Fr.) P.Kumm.(1871)

Genera
- Clitocella; Clitopilopsis; Clitopilus; Entocybe; Entoloma; Rhodocybe; Rhodophana

Synonyms
- Clitopilaceae P.D. Orton (1960) nom. inval. Jugasporaceae Singer (1936) nom. inval. Rhodogoniosporaceae R. Heim (1934) nom. inval. Rhodophyllaceae Singer (1951) nom. illegit.

= Entolomataceae =

Family of fungi

The Entolomataceae are a family of fungi in the order Agaricales. The family contains eight genera and 2250 species, the majority of which are in Entoloma. Basidiocarps (fruit bodies) are typically agaricoid (mushrooms with gills), but a minority are cyphelloid, secotioid, or gasteroid. All produce pink basidiospores that are variously angular (polyhedral), ridged, or nodulose. Species are mostly saprotrophic, though a few are parasitic on other fungi. The family occurs worldwide.

== Taxonomy ==
The family Entolomataceae was first introduced in 1972 by the Czech mycologists František Kotlaba and Zdeněk Pouzar to replace the earlier name Rhodophyllaceae. The latter, introduced in 1951 by Rolf Singer, is illegitimate because it is based on the illegitimate genus Rhodophyllus which includes (and is therefore a superfluous synonym of) the earlier and legitimate name Entoloma. The family is well defined by its distinctive spore morphology, formed by a unique type of spore-wall thickening called the "epicorium", and by recent DNA studies.

=== Genera ===
Many different internal classifications of the Entolomataceae have been proposed. In 1871, German mycologist Paul Kummer created the genera Eccilia, Leptonia, Nolanea, and Entoloma for species with angular spores, based on perceived differences in the morphology of fruit bodies. These genera were widely used throughout the twentieth century, but DNA studies have now shown them to be polyphyletic (artificial).

The current view is that Entolomataceae with angular spores should either all be classified in the genus Entoloma, which forms a large but monophyletic (natural) group, or split between Entoloma and the smaller, basal group Entocybe. Species with longitudinally ridged spores are classified in Clitopilus. Species with nodulose spores are classified in Rhodocybe or Rhodophana. Species with obscurely nodulose spores (appearing almost smooth under a microscope) are classified in Clitocella or Clitopilopsis.

See list of Entolomataceae genera for a table of the main genera into which the family was formerly divided.

== Distribution ==
The family has a cosmopolitan distribution and species are common in both temperate and tropical climates.

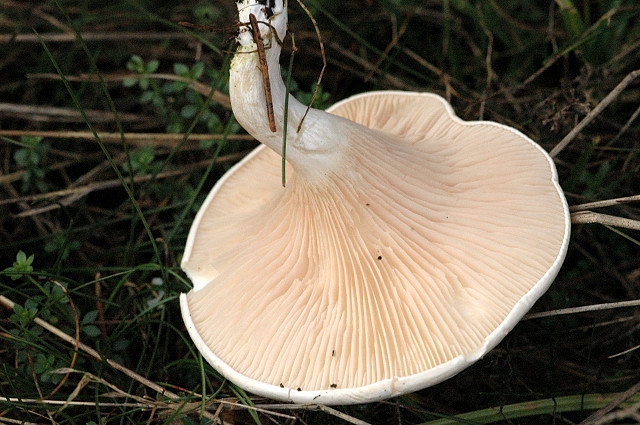
Clitopilus prunulus

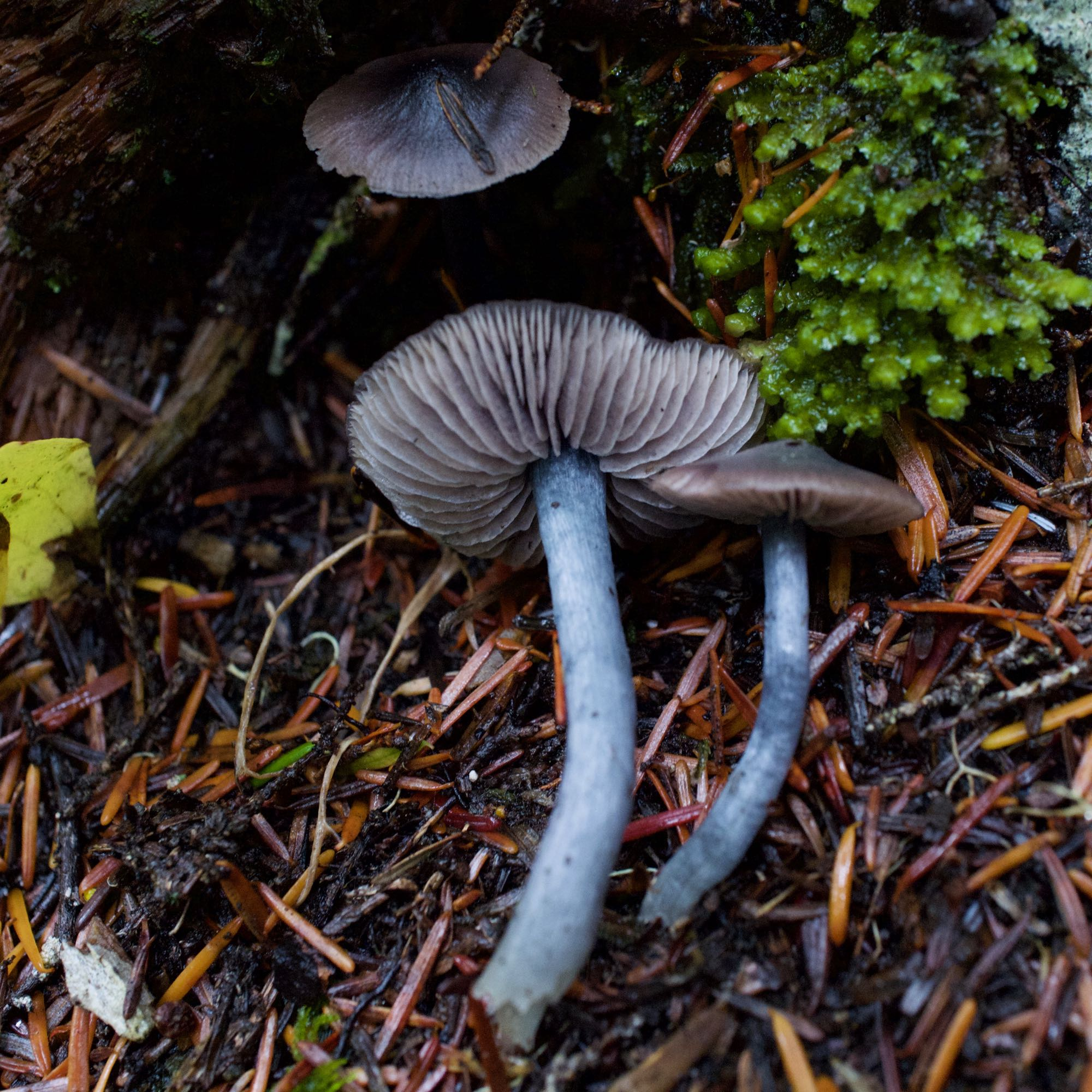
Entocybe trachyospora

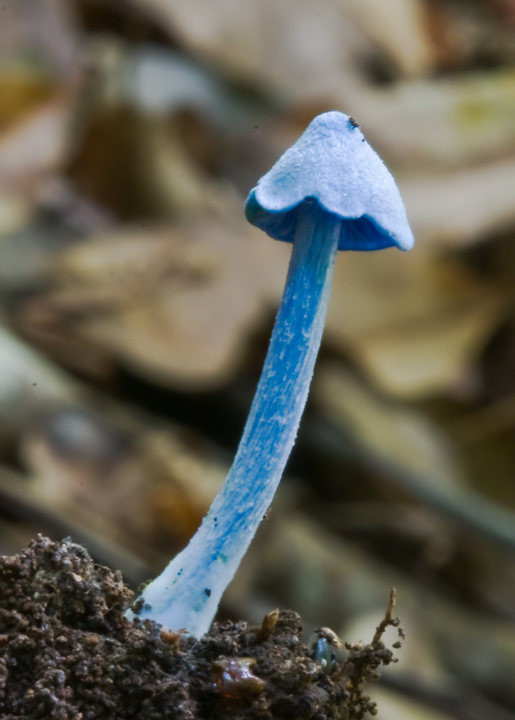
Entoloma hochstetteri

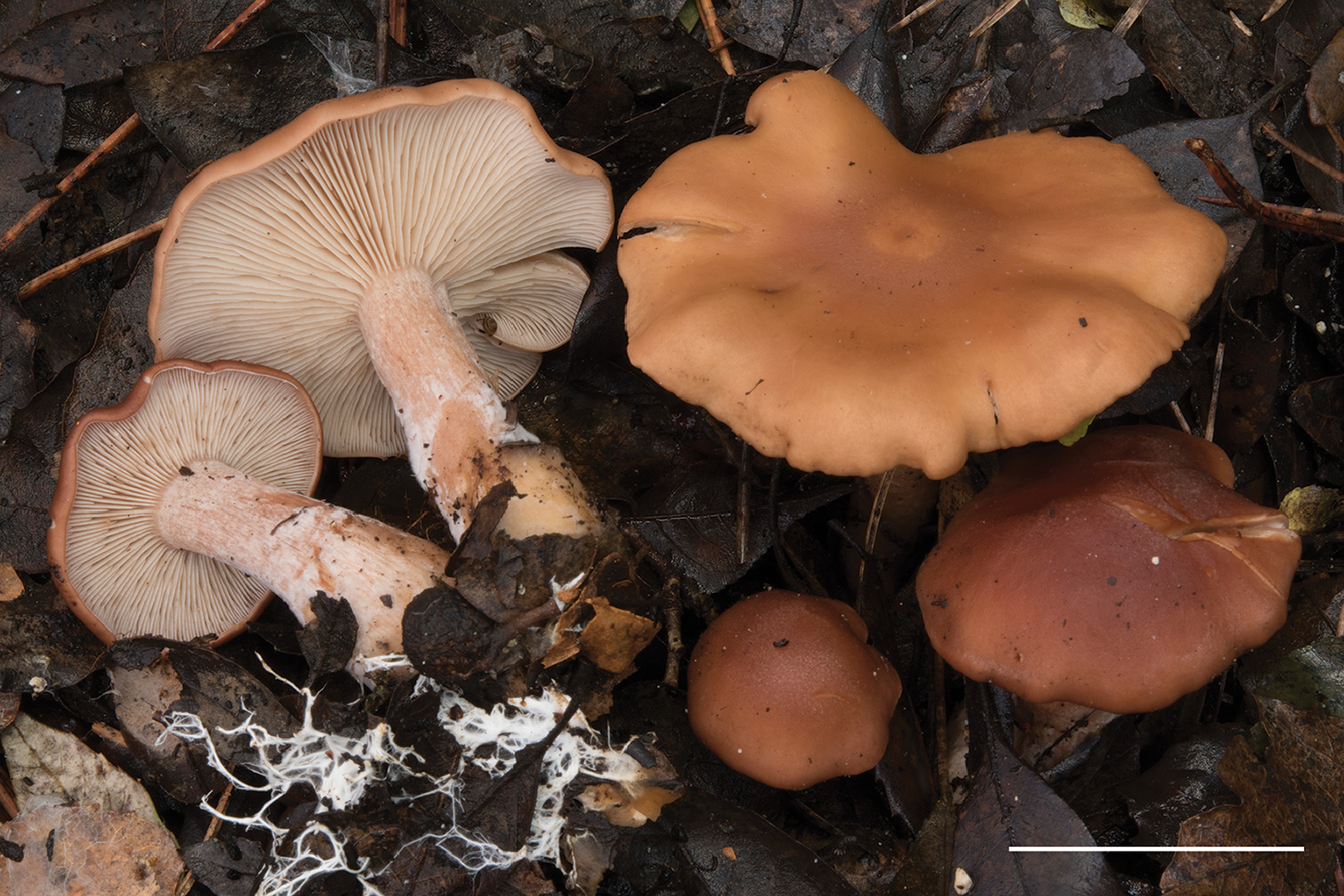
Rhodocybe fumanellii

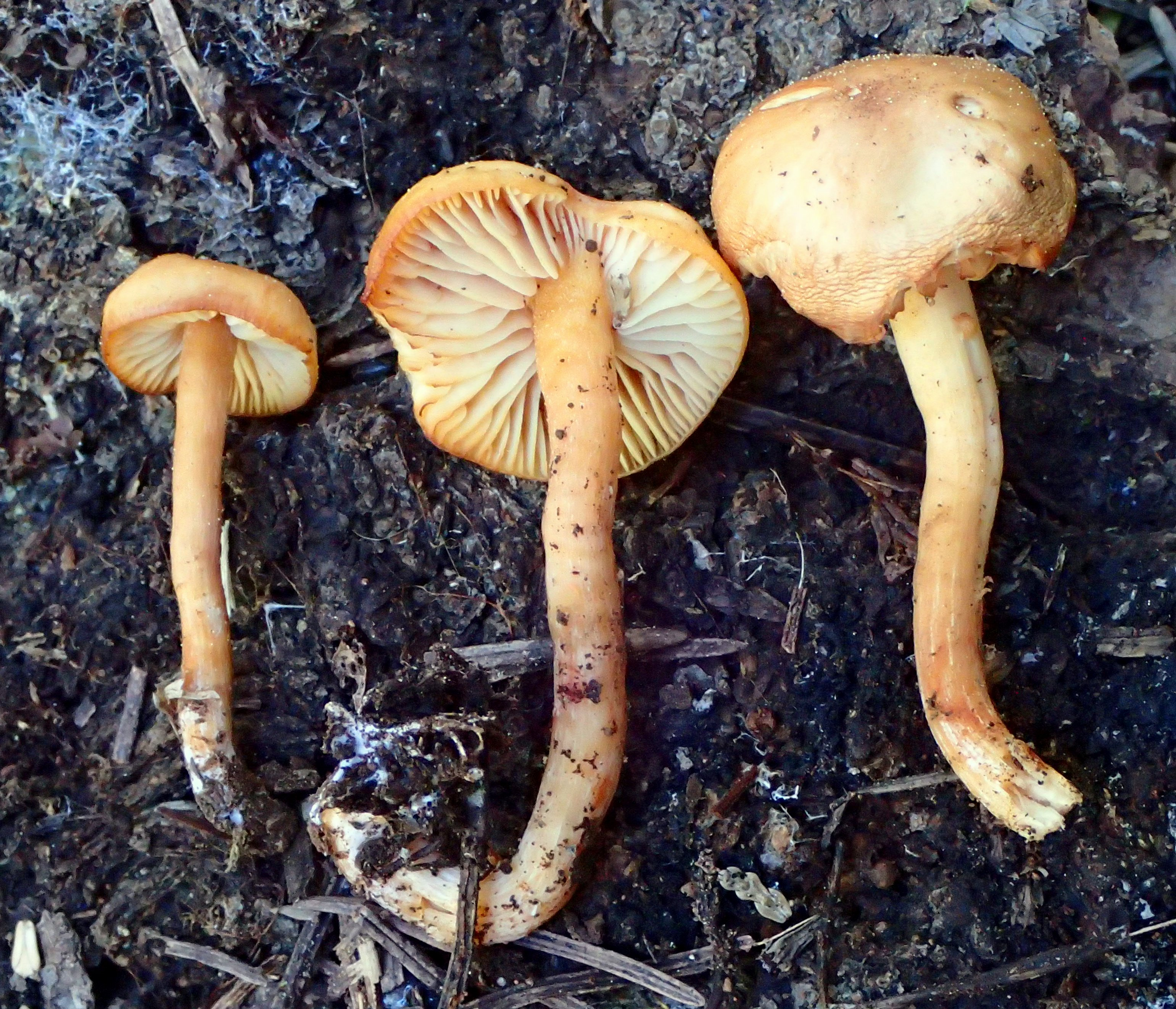
Rhodophana nitellina

== See also ==
- List of Entolomataceae genera
- List of Agaricales families
