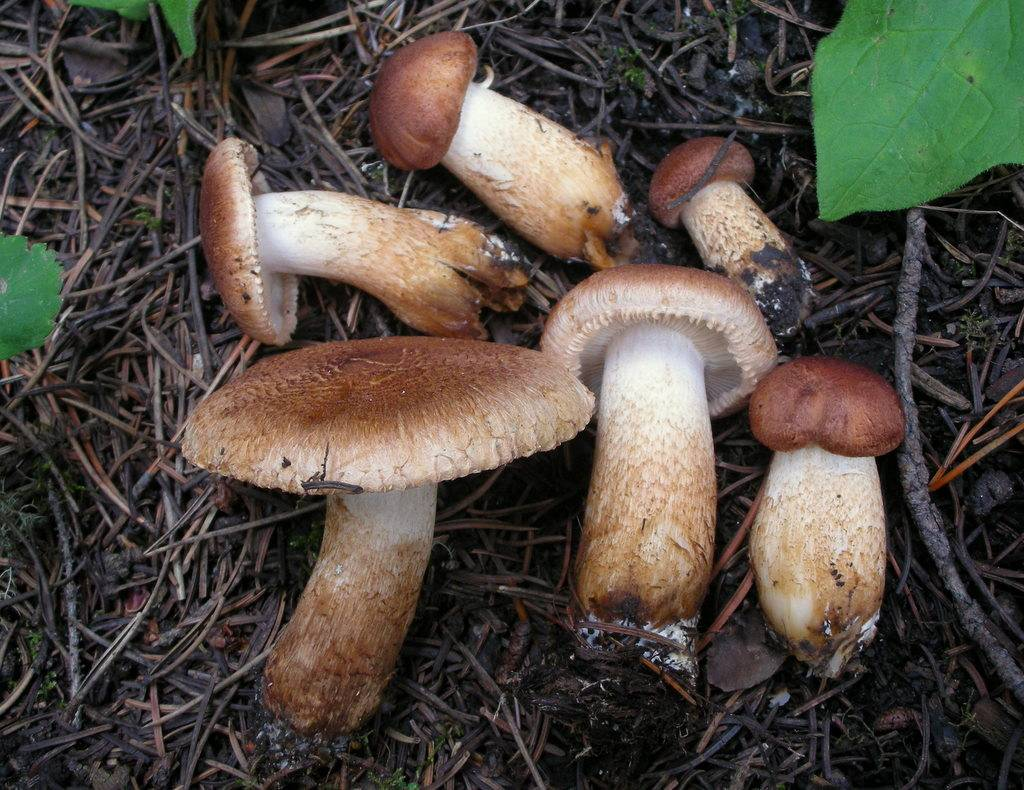

Conservation status
- Secure (NatureServe)

Scientific classification
- Kingdom: Fungi
- Division: Basidiomycota
- Class: Agaricomycetes
- Order: Agaricales
- Family: Tricholomataceae
- Genus: Tricholoma
- Species: T. vaccinum

Binomial name
- Tricholoma vaccinum (Schaeff.) P.Kumm. (1871)

Synonyms
- Agaricus vaccinus Schaeff. (1774); Agaricus rufolivescens Batsch (1783); Agaricus rufus Pers. (1798); Gyrophila vaccina (Schaeff.) Quél. (1886); Tricholoma vaccinium

= Tricholoma vaccinum =

Fungus of the agaric genus Tricholoma

Tricholoma vaccinum
- Mycological characteristics
- Gills on hymenium
- Cap is convex or flat
- Hymenium is adnate or sinuate
- Stipe is bare
- Spore print is white
- Ecology is mycorrhizal
- Edibility is not recommended

Tricholoma vaccinum, commonly known as the russet scaly tricholoma, the scaly knight, or the fuzztop, is a fungus of the agaric genus Tricholoma. It produces medium-sized fruit bodies (mushrooms) that have a distinctive hairy reddish-brown cap with a shaggy margin when young. The cap, which can reach a diameter of up to 6.5 cm (2.6 in) wide, breaks up into flattened scales in maturity. It has cream-buff to pinkish gills with brown spots. Its fibrous, hollow stipe is white above and reddish brown below, and measures 4 to 7.5 cm (1.6 to 3.0 in) long. Although young fruit bodies have a partial veil, it does not leave a ring on the stipe.

Widely distributed in the Northern Hemisphere, Tricholoma vaccinum is found in northern Asia, Europe and North America. The fungus grows in a mycorrhizal association with spruce or pine trees, and its mushrooms are found on the ground growing in groups or clusters in late summer and autumn. Although some consider the mushroom edible, it is of poor quality and not recommended for consumption. The ectomycorrhizae of T. vaccinum has been the subject of considerable research.

== Taxonomy ==
The species was first described in 1774 by German mycologist Jacob Christian Schäffer as Agaricus vaccinus. According to MycoBank, synonyms include August Batsch's 1783 Agaricus rufolivescens, Jean-Baptiste Lamarck's 1783 Amanita punctata var. punctata, and Lucien Quélet's 1886 Gyrophila vaccina. Marcel Bon described the variety T. vaccinum var. fulvosquamosum in 1970, which has squamules (minute scales) arranged in a concentric fashion on the cap; Manfred Enderle published this taxon as a form in 2004.

According to the infrageneric classification of Tricholoma proposed by Rolf Singer in 1986, Tricholoma vaccinum is placed in the section Imbricata, subgenus Tricholoma in the genus Tricholoma. Imbricata includes species with a dry cap cuticle, with a texture that ranges from roughened or squamulose (resembling suede) to almost smooth. The specific epithet derives from the Latin word vaccinus and means "pertaining to cows", probably in reference to its color. The mushroom's common names include the "russet scaly tricholoma", "fuzztop", and "scaly knight".

== Description ==
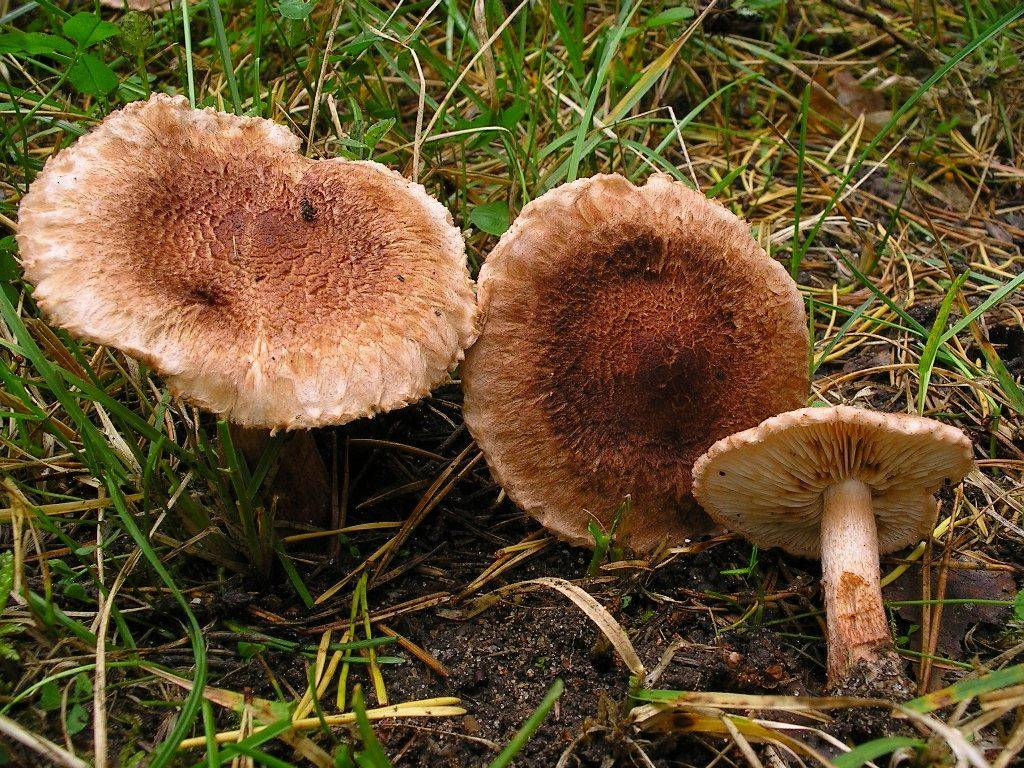
Collection from Sweden

The cap of T. vaccinum is initially broadly conical, then convex and finally flattened; its diameter is usually between 2.5 and 8 cm (1 and 3 in). The cap margin is initially curved inwards, and shaggy from hanging remnants of the partial veil. The partial veil is cotton-like, and does not leave a ring on the stipe. The fibrous to scaly cap surface ranges in color from reddish-cinnamon to brownish-orange to tan. The gills have an adnate to sinuate attachment to the stipe, and are crowded closely together. There are between three and nine tiers of lamellulae—short gills that do not extend completely from the cap edge to the stipe. The gills are dingy white, and frequently stain reddish brown. The stipe is 3 to 8 cm (1 to 3 in) long and 1 to 2 cm (0.5 to 1 in) thick, and becomes hollow in age. It is roughly equal in width throughout its length and ranges in color from whitish to the same color as the cap, but lighter, and sometimes with reddish-brown stains; it is lighter in color near the apex. Like the cap, the stipe surface is fibrous to scaly. The odor of the fruit bodies is unpleasant.

The mushrooms produce a white spore print, and the spores are broadly elliptical, smooth, hyaline (translucent), inamyloid, measuring 6–7.5 by 4–5 μm. The basidia (spore-bearing cells) are four-spored, without clamps, and measure 17–32 by 6.0–7.5 μm. The hymenium lacks cystidia. The arrangement of the hyphae in the cap cuticle ranges from a cutis (with hyphae that run parallel to the cap surface) to a trichoderm (hyphae perpendicular to the cap surface); these hyphae are roughly cylindrical, and measure 3.5–8.0 μm wide, with roughly cylindrical to club-shaped ends that are 6.0–11.0 μm wide. There are no clamp connections in the hyphae of T. vaccinum.

=== Similar species ===
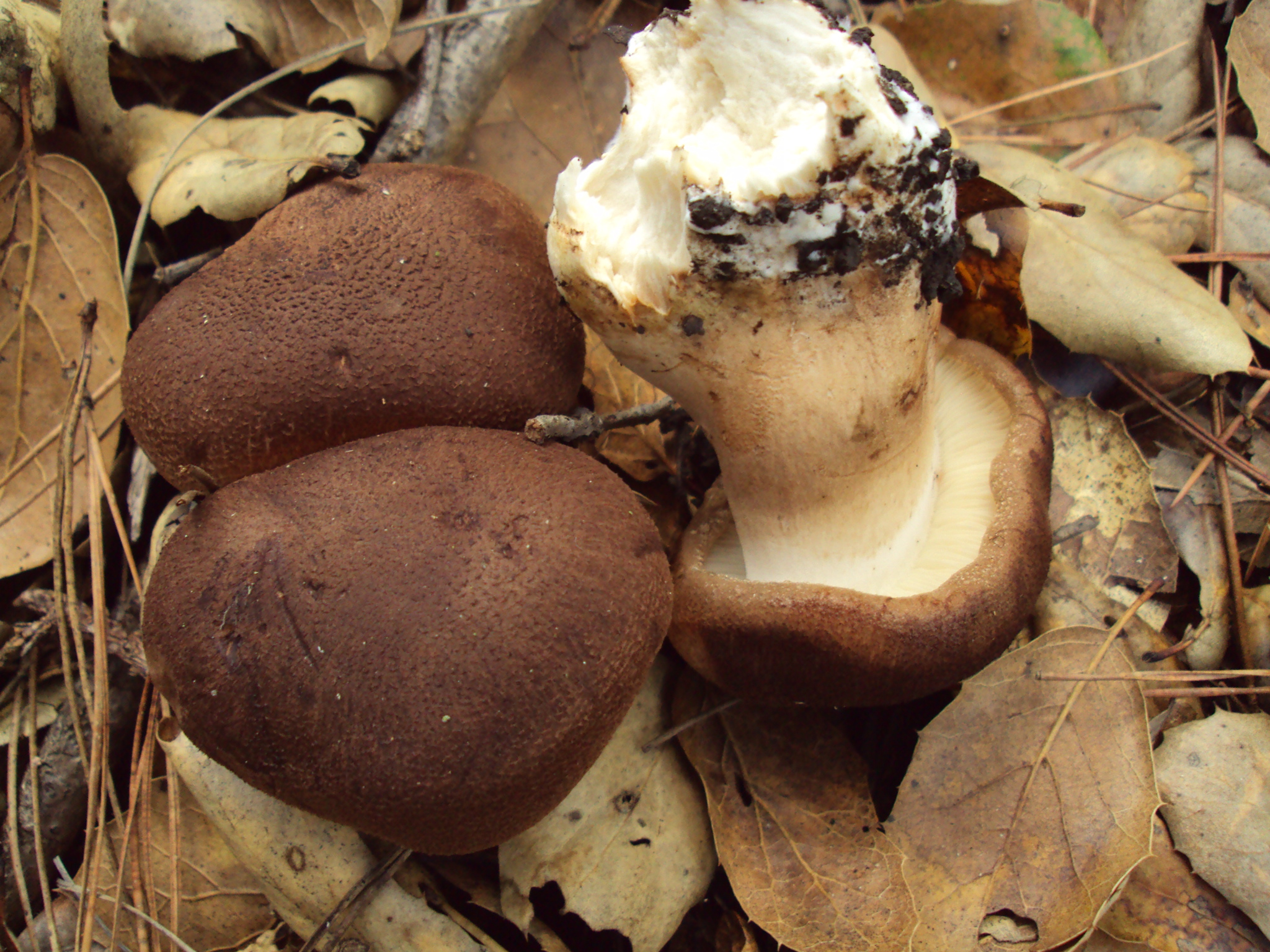
Tricholoma imbricatum

With its reddish-brown wooly cap, white gills, and hollow stipe, T. vaccinum is a fairly distinct mushroom and is unlikely to be confused with other Tricholomas. Tricholoma imbricatum somewhat resembles T. vaccinum, but has duller brown colors, is less robust in stature, and has a solid (not hollow) stalk. Another lookalike, T. inodermeum, has a less woolly cap texture and flesh that turns bright pinkish red when injured. It associates solely with pine species and prefers calcareous soil. Other brownish Tricholoma species include T. fracticum, T. dryophilum, and T. muricatum. The scaly and fibrous cap surface of T. vaccinum might be confused with Inocybe, but species in this genus can be distinguished by their brown spore prints.

== Habitat and distribution ==
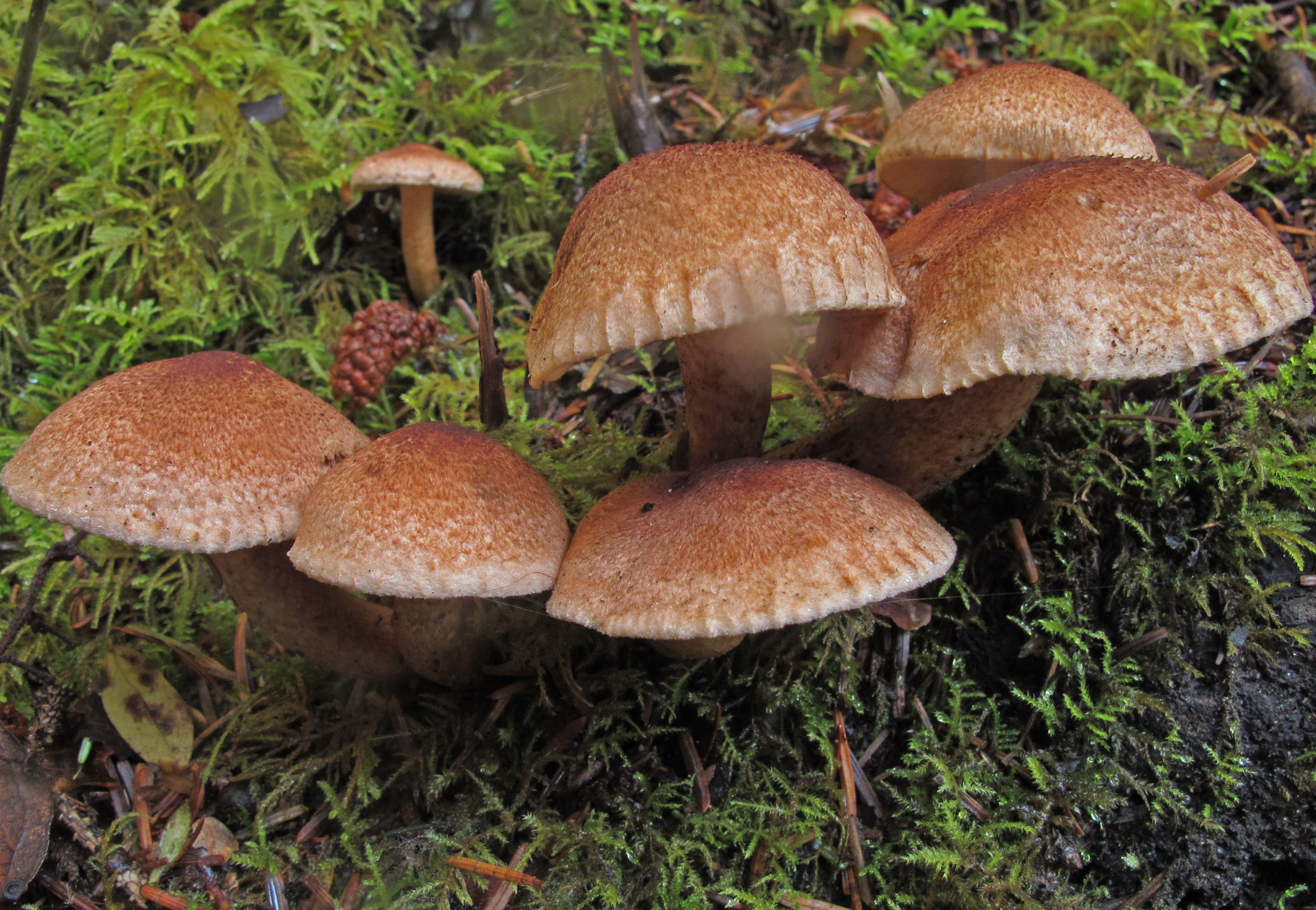
Fruit bodies often grow on the ground in moss, like this cluster photographed under spruce in Oregon.

Tricholoma vaccinum is a mycorrhizal species, and grows in association with coniferous trees, especially pine and spruce. It forms ectomycorrhizae that have been called "Medium-Distance fringe exploration type", indicative of the ectomycorrhiza's ecological role in space occupation in the soil, their possible reach regarding nutrient acquisition and their demand of carbohydrates that have to be invested by the trees for their fungal partners. Fruit bodies usually appear in groups or clusters on the ground, sometimes with moss. The fungus fruits in late summer and autumn. It is found in northern Asia, Europe, and, in North America, is widely distributed in the United States and Canada, and has also been recorded in Mexico. It is one of the most common species of Tricholoma in Central Europe, and is often found in large groups in spruce forests. It is rare in the United Kingdom, and most records have been from Scotland. The fungus may be extinct in the Netherlands.

The ectomycorrhizae of T. vaccinum has been the subject of considerable research. Ectomycorrhizae of Tricholoma species can vary considerably among species in the genus, and differences in the structure of rhizomorphs (a cordlike fusions of hyphae resembling a root) have been used to key out species. Mycorrhizae formed with Norway spruce (Picea abies) are conspicuously hairy with numerous hyphae. The hyphae are partly densely interconnected to rhizomorphs that have a pigment in their outer membrane. The emanating hyphae mostly lack "contact septae" (fully developed simple septae) and contact clamps, and the rhizomorph hyphae vary markedly in diameter. The Hartig net (a network of hyphae that extend into the root) formed by T. vaccinum grows more deeply towards the epidermis, is composed of more rows of hyphae and has more tannin cells in close proximity to the epidermis, and consequently, fewer cortical cells in this position. It is here that the rhizomorphs make the closest contact with the rootlets. The mantle is prosenchymatous, meaning that the constituent hyphae are loosely organized with spaces between them. A combination of techniques including freeze fracturing and scanning electron microscopy has been used to probe the microstructure of the ectomycorrhizae, including inner mantle thickness and the nature of the interface between the Hartig net and host cells. Several fungal genes specifically expressed during ectomycorrhizal interaction between T. vaccinum and Picea abies have been identified, including some involved in a plant pathogen response, nutrient exchange and growth in the plant, signal transduction, and stress response. The first characterized fungal aldehyde dehydrogenase enzyme, ALD1, helps circumvent ethanol stress—a critical function in mycorrhizal habitats.

== Uses ==
Although the fruit bodies have sometimes been considered edible, they are of low quality and reportedly mildly poisonous. They are also not recommended for consumption due to their resemblance to toxic brown Tricholomas. Orson K. Miller, Jr. considers them "bitter and not edible".

The fruit bodies can be used to create yellow dyes to color wool or other fibers.

== See also ==
- List of North American Tricholoma
- List of Tricholoma species
