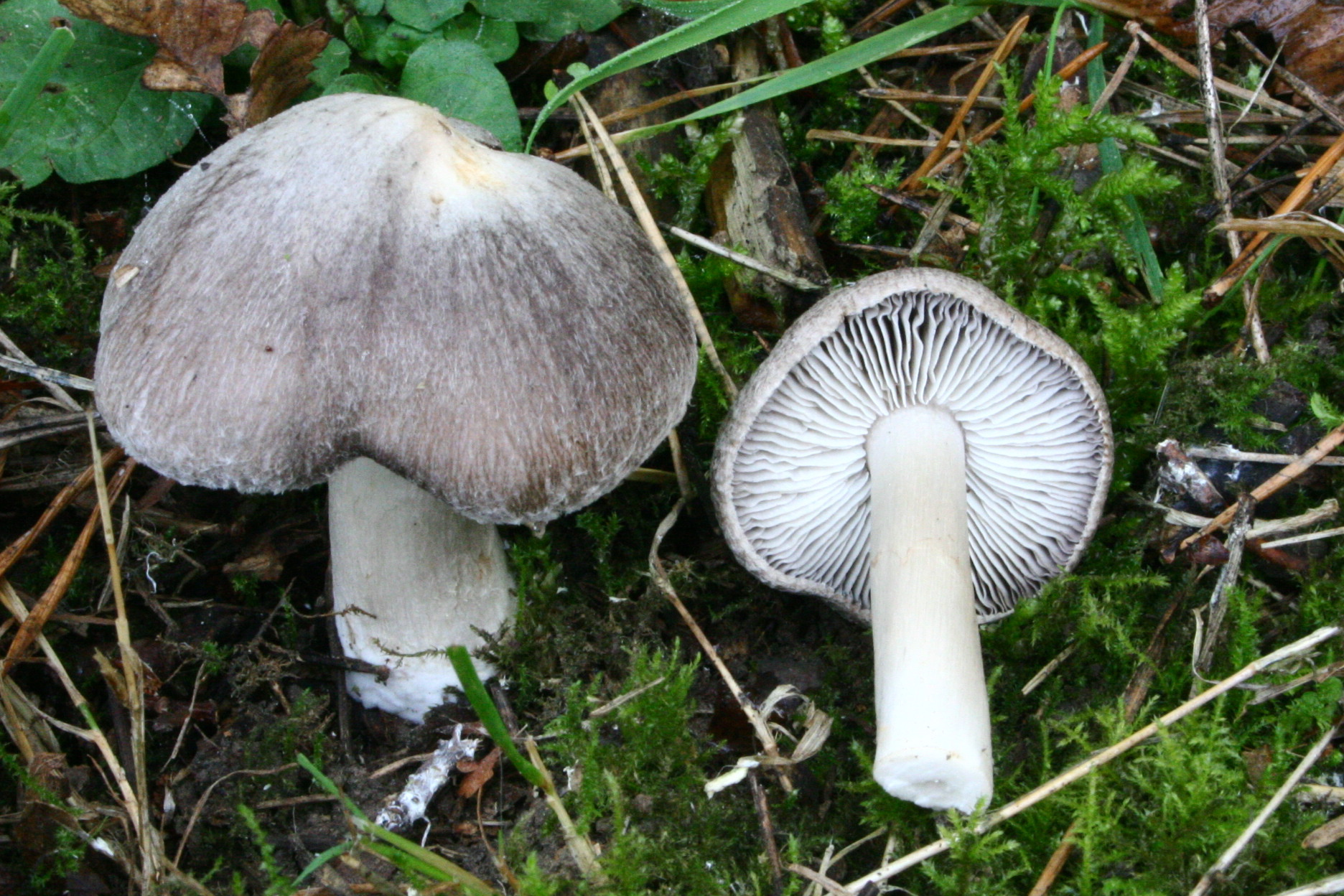

Scientific classification
- Kingdom: Fungi
- Division: Basidiomycota
- Class: Agaricomycetes
- Order: Agaricales
- Family: Tricholomataceae
- Genus: Tricholoma
- Species: T. terreum

Binomial name
- Tricholoma terreum (Schaeff.) P.Kumm. (1871)

Synonyms
- Agaricus terreum Schaeff. (1774); Tricholoma myomyces (Pers.) J.E.Lange

= Tricholoma terreum =

Species of fungus

Tricholoma terreum
- Mycological characteristics
- Gills on hymenium
- Cap is convex or flat
- Hymenium is adnexed
- Stipe is bare
- Spore print is white to cream
- Ecology is mycorrhizal
- Edibility is not recommended

Tricholoma terreum, commonly known as the mouse tricholoma, grey knight or dirty tricholoma, is a grey-capped mushroom of the large genus Tricholoma. It is found in coniferous woodlands in Europe and North America, and has also been encountered under introduced pine trees in Australia and New Zealand. It is regarded as edible, but is toxic in extremely high quantities.

== Taxonomy ==
The fungus was originally described as Agaricus terreus by Jacob Christian Schäffer in 1762, and as Agaricus myomyces by mycologist Christian Hendrik Persoon in 1794. It was given its current binomial name by German Paul Kummer in 1871. It is commonly known as the grey knight from its discoloured gills.

Almost all modern sources consider Tricholoma myomyces to be a synonym of T. terreum, but there are some exceptions. Bon mentions that T. myomyces has been defined for lowland mushrooms with white gills and a fleecy cap and Courtecuisse separates it on the same basis. Moser distinguished T. myomyces on the basis that the gills should go yellow.

== Description ==
The cap is 4–7 centimetres (1 1/2–2 3/4 inches) wide and evenly covered in fine grey scales. Convex with a slight umbo, it is broadly conical in shape. The whitish stipe is 3–8 cm (1 1/4–3 1/4 in) long and 1.5 cm (1/2 in) wide and has no ring. There is no ring or volva. The whitish flesh is thin, easily broken, and has a pleasant mild to farinaceous smell and taste. The gills are fairly close and adnate to adnexed. The spore print is white. The oval spores are 6–7 μm long by 3.5–4.4 μm wide.

=== Similar species ===
It could be confused with the larger (and poisonous) T. pardinum has a mealy smell and cap scales; the edible T. orirubens has fine dark scales and pinkish gills.

== Distribution and habitat ==
Tricholoma terreum is found in Europe (September–December), where fruiting bodies appear under conifers, particularly pine and spruce, from late summer to late autumn. It can be found in much of North America from August to December, and slightly later on the West Coast. They may also arise in parks near these trees, and grow in fairy rings. They are generally in quite densely populated groups though not bunched. It has been recorded growing under exotic Pinus radiata plantations in Australia.

== Edibility ==
With a mild taste, the species used to be widely regarded as a good edible. It is seen in markets in France, along with Clitocybe nebularis and Tricholoma portentosum.

One 1970s source recommended that inexperienced pickers avoid all grey tricholomas. Chemical tests published in 2014 show that the species may contain toxins which can cause rhabdomyolysis, leading to speculation that the mushroom was poisonous, apparently debunked in 2016. In 2018, research showed that only an abnormal quantity of Tricholoma mushrooms would trigger the rhabdomyolysis, with consumption of about 200 g safe unless there is an individual reaction. A 2024 study also tested for and concluded that toxin levels were negligible enough for T. terreum for it to be considered an edible mushroom.

One source lists T. terreum var. cystidiotum as edible but not recommended, as it can easily be confused with poisonous species and species of unknown edibility.

== See also ==
- List of North American Tricholoma
- List of Tricholoma species
