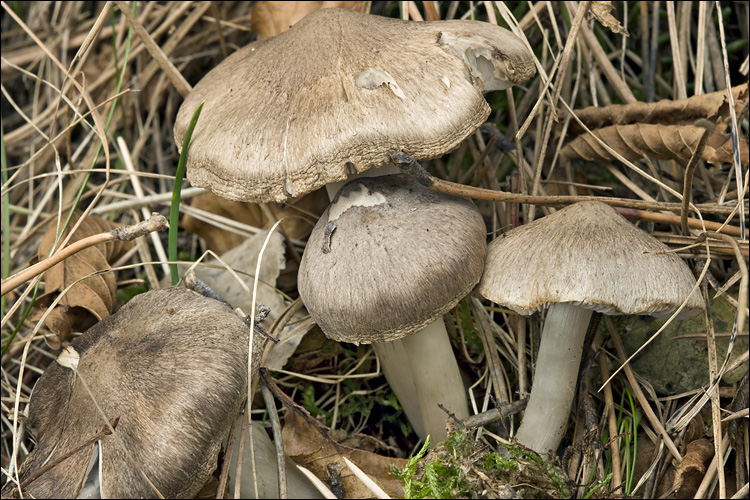

Scientific classification
- Kingdom: Fungi
- Division: Basidiomycota
- Class: Agaricomycetes
- Order: Agaricales
- Family: Tricholomataceae
- Genus: Tricholoma
- Species: T. myomyces

Binomial name
- Tricholoma myomyces (Pers.) J.E.Lange (1933)

Synonyms
- Agaricus myomyces Pers. (1794); Gymnopus myomyces (Pers.) Gray (1821); Tricholoma terreum (Schaeff.) P. Kumm.

= Tricholoma myomyces =

Species of fungus

Tricholoma myomyces is a mushroom of the agaric genus Tricholoma, usually considered to be a synonym of Tricholoma terreum. The species was first described scientifically by Christian Hendrik Persoon in 1794 as Agaricus myomyces, and later transferred to the genus Tricholoma by Danish mycologist Jakob Emanuel Lange in 1933. It is found in Europe and northern North America.

Almost all modern sources consider T. myomyces to be a synonym of T. terreum, but there are some exceptions. Bon mentions that T. myomyces has been defined for lowland mushrooms with white gills and a fleecy cap. Courtecuisse separates it on a similar basis: the cap surface is felty and the gills are whitish and more crowded. Moser distinguished T. myomyces on the basis that the gills should go yellow.

The gray cap is 2–5 cm wide. The whitish stalk is 2–5 cm long and .5–1 cm wide. It has white spores.

One similar species is Tricholoma moseri.

== See also ==
- List of North American Tricholoma
