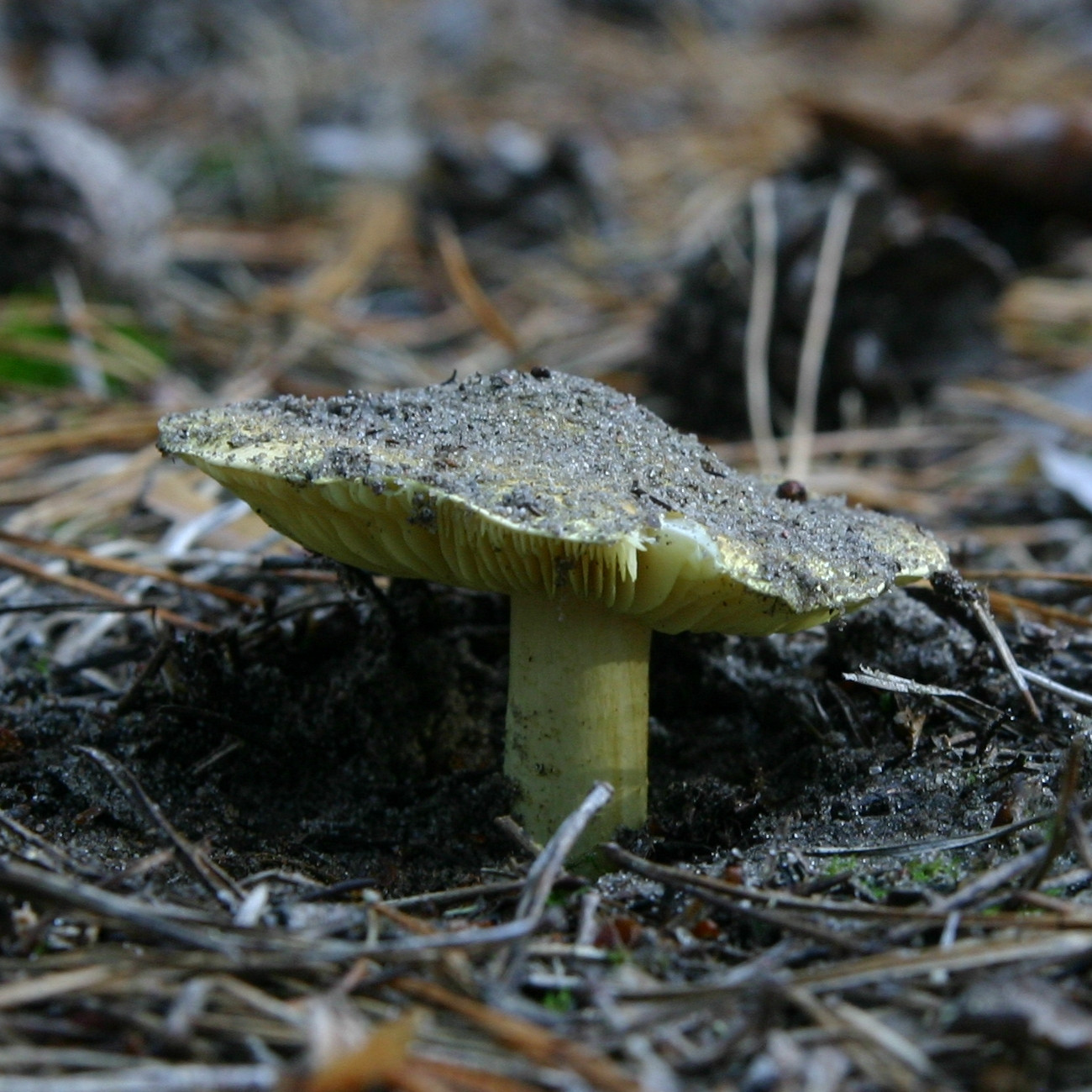

Conservation status
- Secure (NatureServe)

Scientific classification
- Kingdom: Fungi
- Division: Basidiomycota
- Class: Agaricomycetes
- Order: Agaricales
- Family: Tricholomataceae
- Genus: Tricholoma
- Species: T. equestre

Binomial name
- Tricholoma equestre (L.) P.Kumm.

= Tricholoma equestre =

Species of fungus

Tricholoma equestre
- Mycological characteristics
- Gills on hymenium
- Cap is flat
- Hymenium is adnexed
- Stipe is bare
- Spore print is white
- Ecology is mycorrhizal
- Edibility is not recommended or poisonous

Tricholoma equestre or Tricholoma flavovirens, commonly known as the man on horseback, canary trich, yellow-gilled trich, yellow knight, or saddle-shaped tricholoma, is a species of fungus of the genus Tricholoma that forms ectomycorrhiza with pine trees.

It has been treasured as an edible mushroom worldwide and is especially abundant in France and Central Portugal. Although it is regarded as quite tasty, cases of poisoning from eating the species have been reported from Europe.

== Taxonomy ==
Tricholoma equestre was known to Carl Linnaeus, who officially described it in Volume Two of his Species Plantarum in 1753, giving it the name Agaricus equestris, predating a description of Agaricus flavovirens by Persoon in 1793. Thus this specific name meaning "of or pertaining to horses" in Latin takes precedence over Tricholoma flavovirens, the other scientific name by which this mushroom has been known. It was placed in the genus Tricholoma by German Paul Kummer in his 1871 work Der Führer in die Pilzkunde. The generic name derives from the Greek trichos/τριχος 'hair' and loma/λωμα 'hem', 'fringe' or 'border'.

== Description ==
The cap ranges from 5–15 centimetres (2–6 in) in width and is usually yellow with brownish areas, particularly at the centre. The skin layer covering the cap is sticky and can be peeled off. The yellow stem is 4–10 cm long and 1–2 cm wide, and brownish at the base. The gills are also yellow and the spores are white, producing a white spore print.

=== Similar species ===
It can easily be mistaken for a variety of other members of the genus Tricholoma, such as T. auratum, T. aestuans, T. intermedium, T. sejunctum, and T. sulphureum. Other similar species include Floccularia albolanaripes and F. luteovirens.

== Toxicity ==
This species was for a long time highly regarded as one of the tastier edible species (and by some authors still is) and was sold in European markets. Medieval French knights allegedly reserved this species for themselves, leaving the lowly bovine bolete (Suillus bovinus) for the peasants.

Concern was first raised in southwestern France. People who have been poisoned have all had three or more meals containing T. equestre within the last two weeks prior to treatment. One to four days after their last meal containing the fungus, patients reported muscle weakness, sometimes accompanied by pain. This weakness progressed for another three to four days, accompanied by a feeling of stiffness and darkening of the urine. Periods of nausea, sweating and reddening of the face were also reported, with no fever present.

There have been no reported cases of poisoning in North America, and there is speculation that the respective mushrooms may in fact be different species that are very similar in appearance. Molecular research shows that multiple species may have been identified as the synonym T. flavovirens on the West Coast.

There are reports of deaths of patients being treated for T. equestre poisoning. The poison in this mushroom remains unknown. The mechanism of poisoning is suspected to be rhabdomyolysis, damaging of the cell membrane of skeletal muscle fibres. In this disorder, the oxygen-carrying muscular protein myoglobin is released and appears in urine, resulting in symptoms such as muscle pain and brownish coloration of the urine.

A 2018 research study conducted in Poland with the recruitment of ten healthy volunteers who ate 300 grams per head (about twice the normal dose) of fried T. equestre in a single meal reported no consequences or alterations. However, a 2020 systematic review highlighted several studies indicating elevated plasma creatine kinase (CK) pro-inflammatory activities, in addition to its effect on other liver function biomarkers, underlining a cause for concern and suggests "not to harvest and consume this species". The same 2020 study registered the same level of plasma CK using different edible mushrooms. For example the same level obtained by T. equestre was also obtained by Boletus edulis.

== In culture ==
It is known as Grünling in German, gąska zielonka in Polish, míscaro in Portuguese and canari in French.

== See also ==
- Pine mushroom
- Mushroom hunting
- List of deadly fungi
- List of North American Tricholoma
- List of Tricholoma species
