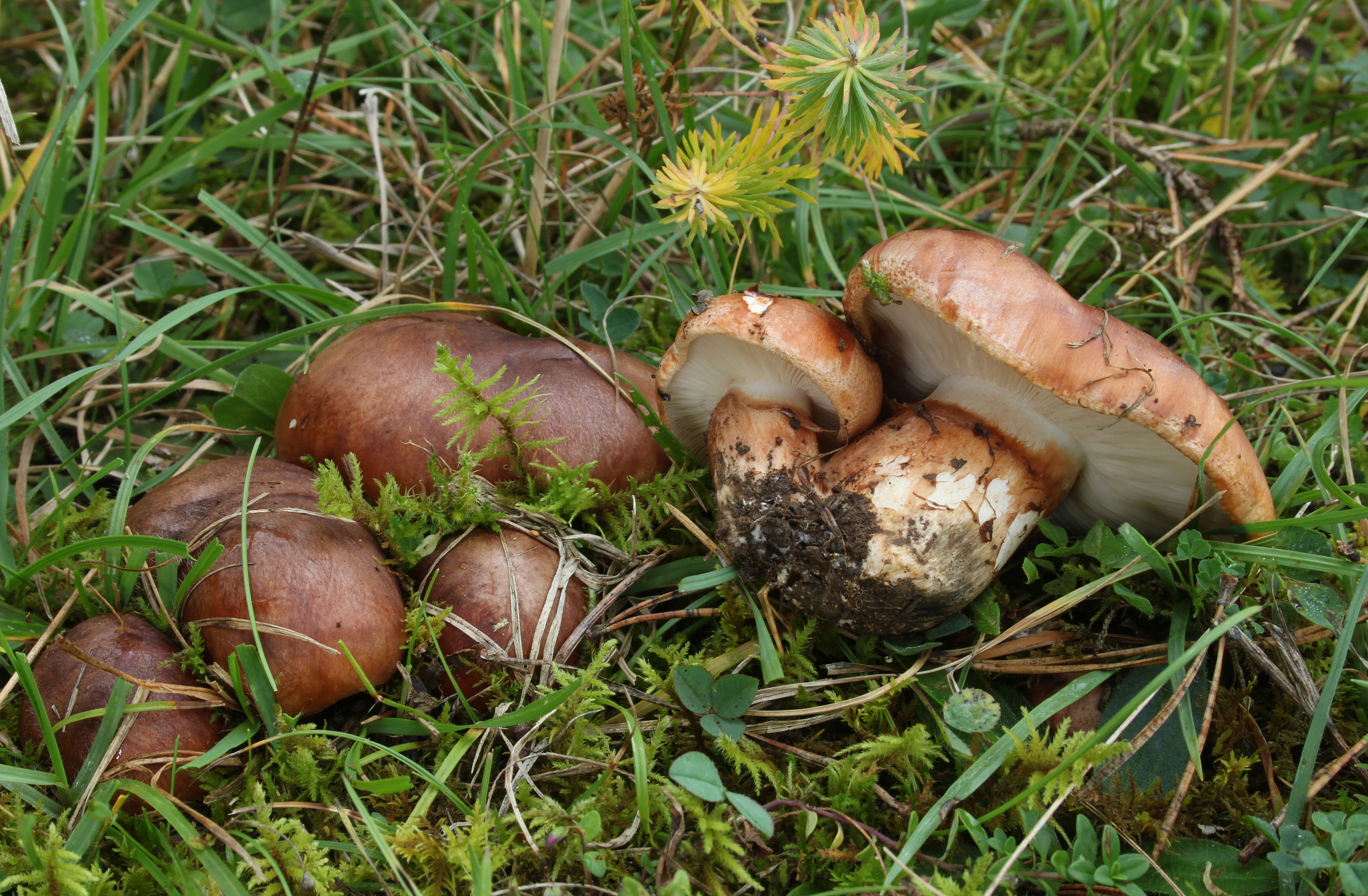

Scientific classification
- Domain: Eukaryota
- Kingdom: Fungi
- Division: Basidiomycota
- Class: Agaricomycetes
- Order: Agaricales
- Family: Tricholomataceae
- Genus: Tricholoma
- Species: T. fracticum

Binomial name
- Tricholoma fracticum (Britzelm.) Kreisel (1984)

Synonyms
- Agaricus fracticus Britzelm. (1893); Agaricus cuneiforme Britzelm. (1893); Armillaria fractica (Britzelm.) Sacc. (1895); Tricholoma cuneiforme Britzelm. (1895)

= Tricholoma fracticum =

Species of fungus

Tricholoma fracticum Mycological characteristics
- Gills on hymenium
- Cap is convex
- Hymenium is subdecurrent
- Stipe has a ring
- Spore print is white
- Ecology is mycorrhizal
- Edibility is inedible

Tricholoma fracticum is a sturdy mushroom of the agaric genus Tricholoma with a red-brown cap and a harshly bitter taste. It is mycorrhizal with conifers, primarily of the genus Pinus, and can be found in California.

== Taxonomy ==
First described as Agaricus fracticus by German mycologist Max Britzelmayr in 1893, it was transferred to the genus Tricholoma in 1984 by Hanns Kreisel. Though it has been occasionally listed as a synonym of the European species Tricholoma batschii, T. fracticum possesses larger spores and 2-spored basidia in contrast with T. batschii's 4-spored basidia; they are currently considered separate species.

== Description ==
The red-brown cap is more or less smooth, with an initially inrolled margin, 3–15 centimetres (1 1/4–6 in) in diameter, broadly convex and flattening slightly in maturity. It becomes viscid when wet. The gills are whitish, attached, and notched to subdecurrent.

The stem is sturdy, 2–8 cm (3/4–3 1/4 in) long, 1–2.5 cm thick, whitish near apex, orange-brown below, with a flimsy but usually present ring. The flesh is white, not bruising or changing upon exposure. The odor is indistinct. The flesh has a sharp, bitter taste, which is always present in this species. The spore print is white.

=== Similar species ===
Tricholoma fracticum is distinguishable with relative ease by noting the combination of a red-brown cap that becomes slimy when wet, and a quickly disappearing partial veil that leaves a flimsy ring or sometimes only a delineation in stipe color up towards the gills. No other Tricholoma in California has both of these features.

T. aurantium has a blander, mealy taste. T. muricatum has a mealy or cucumber-like scent, and T. ustaloides grows with oak.

== Habitat and distribution ==
It is mycorrhizal with conifers, primarily of the genus Pinus, and can be found in California from October to January.

== See also ==
- List of North American Tricholoma
- List of Tricholoma species
