= Tricholoma xanthophyllum =

Scientific classification
- Domain: Eukaryota
- Kingdom: Fungi
- Division: Basidiomycota
- Class: Agaricomycetes
- Order: Agaricales
- Family: Tricholomataceae
- Genus: Tricholoma
- Species: T. xanthophyllum

Binomial name
- Tricholoma xanthophyllum Corner (1994)

Species of fungus

Tricholoma xanthophyllum is an agaric fungus of the genus Tricholoma. Found in Singapore, it was described as new to science in 1994 by English mycologist E.J.H. Corner.

== See also ==
- List of Tricholoma species
