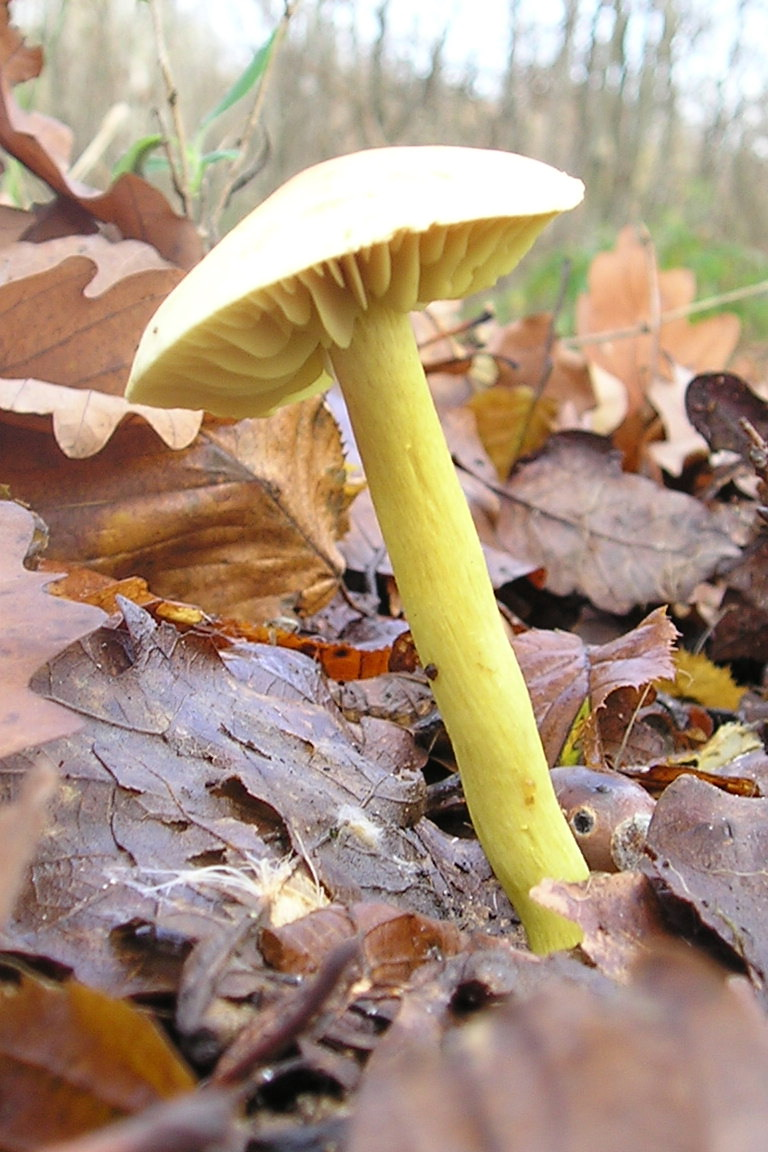
- Tricholoma sulphureum in woodland, France

Scientific classification
- Kingdom: Fungi
- Division: Basidiomycota
- Class: Agaricomycetes
- Order: Agaricales
- Family: Tricholomataceae
- Genus: Tricholoma
- Species: T. sulphureum

Binomial name
- Tricholoma sulphureum (Bull. ex Fr.) P.Kumm. (1871)

= Tricholoma sulphureum =

Species of fungus

Tricholoma sulphureum
- Mycological characteristics
- Gills on hymenium
- Cap is convex
- Hymenium is adnexed
- Stipe is bare
- Spore print is white
- Ecology is mycorrhizal
- Edibility is poisonous

Tricholoma sulphureum, also known as the stinker, yellow stinky trich, sulphur knight or gas agaric, is a species of fungus. The mushroom has a distinctive bright yellow colour and an unusual smell likened to coal gas. It occurs in deciduous woodlands in Europe from spring to autumn. It is inedible or mildly poisonous.

== Taxonomy ==
Tricholoma sulphureum was first described in 1784 by the French botanist Pierre Bulliard and given the name Agaricus sulphureus, before being placed in the genus Tricholoma by German mycologist Paul Kummer in 1871. The specific epithet sulfǔrěus derived from the Latin 'of or pertaining to sulfur'. It belongs to a complex of similar foul-smelling species such as the very similar T. inamoenum. Another related species, T. bufonium, may be an intraspecific variant.

== Description ==
The mushroom is sulphur yellow in colour. It has a convex cap, sometimes brownish near the center with a vague umbo up to 8 cm (3 in) across. The gills are adnexed or notched, thick and spaced. The stem is up to 10 cmlong. The spore print is white. The flesh is thin and has a poor odour.

The smell, caused by the chemical skatole, is enough to distinguish it from other yellow fungi. John Ramsbottom reports that it has a complex smell that has been likened variously to Jasmine, Narcissus, Hyacinth, Hemerocallis flava, Lilac, Tagetes, decayed hemp or coal gas, as well as described as nauseating or foetid. The taste is bitter.

=== Similar species ===
It could be confused with the darker T. equestre, which has a sticky cap, white flesh, thin crowded gills, and a mealy smell.

== Distribution and habitat ==
Tricholoma sulphureum is found in deciduous woods, particularly beech, and can occur anytime from spring until autumn. It is found across Europe and has been confirmed as far east as China. It is also distributed in North America, where it grows also with conifers. It is commonly known as the "Stinker" or "Sulfur Trich". In Turkey, it is considered critically endangered.

== Toxicity ==
The fungus is usually classified as inedible and is suspected of being poisonous. Reported symptoms are mostly gastrointestinal, some neurological.

== See also ==
- List of North American Tricholoma
- List of Tricholoma species
