= Tricholoma huronense =

Scientific classification
- Domain: Eukaryota
- Kingdom: Fungi
- Division: Basidiomycota
- Class: Agaricomycetes
- Order: Agaricales
- Family: Tricholomataceae
- Genus: Tricholoma
- Species: T. huronense

Binomial name
- Tricholoma huronense A.H.Sm. (1942)

Species of fungus

Tricholoma huronense is a mushroom of the agaric genus Tricholoma. It was first described in 1942 by American mycologist Alexander H. Smith based on collections made in Michigan.
