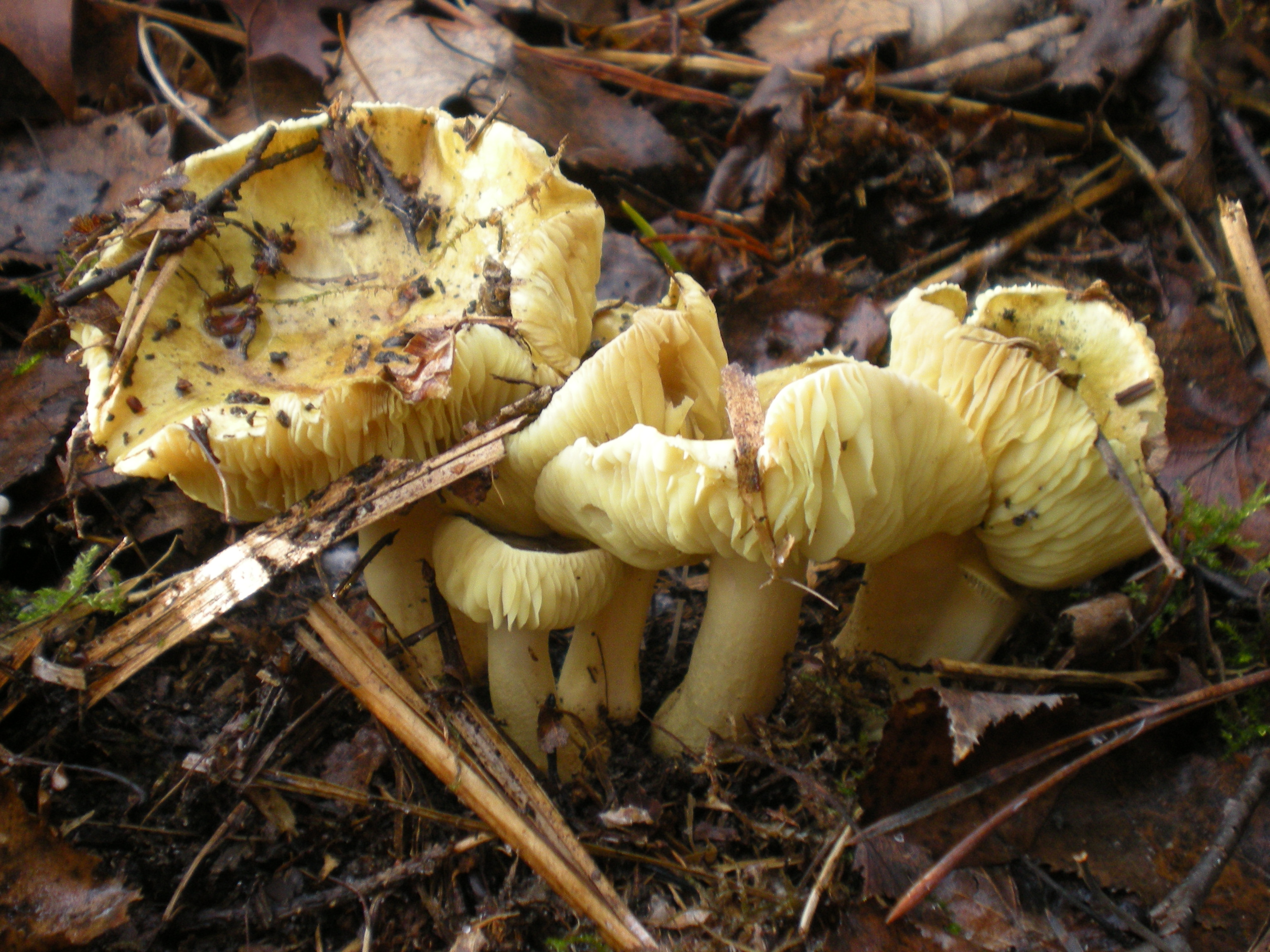
- Tricholoma flavovirens

Scientific classification
- Domain: Eukaryota
- Kingdom: Fungi
- Division: Basidiomycota
- Class: Agaricomycetes
- Order: Agaricales
- Family: Tricholomataceae
- Genus: Tricholoma; Fries

Type species
- Tricholoma equestre (L.) P.Kumm.

= Tricholoma =

Genus of fungi

Tricholoma is a genus of fungus that contains many fairly fleshy white-spored gilled mushrooms which are found worldwide generally growing in woodlands. These are ectomycorrhizal fungi, existing in a symbiotic relationship with various species of coniferous or broad-leaved trees. The generic name derives from Ancient Greek: τριχο-, romanized: tricho-, lit. 'hair' and Ancient Greek: λῶμα, romanized: loma, lit. 'fringe, border' although only a few species (such as T. vaccinum) have shaggy caps which fit this description.

The most sought-out species are the East Asian T. matsutake, also known as matsutake or songi, and the North American Tricholoma magnivelare species complex, also known as "ponderosa mushroom", "American matsutake", or "pine mushroom". Others are safe to eat, such as T. terreum, but there are a few poisonous members, such as T. pardinum, T. tigrinum and T. equestre.

Many species originally described within Tricholoma have since been moved to other genera. These include the Wood blewit (Clitocybe nuda), previously T. nudum, blewit (Clitocybe saeva), previously T. personatum, and St George's mushroom (Calocybe gambosa) previously T. gambosum.

Tricholomalides are neurotrophic diterpenoids isolated from species of Tricholoma.

Tricholomalides A and B

== Species list ==
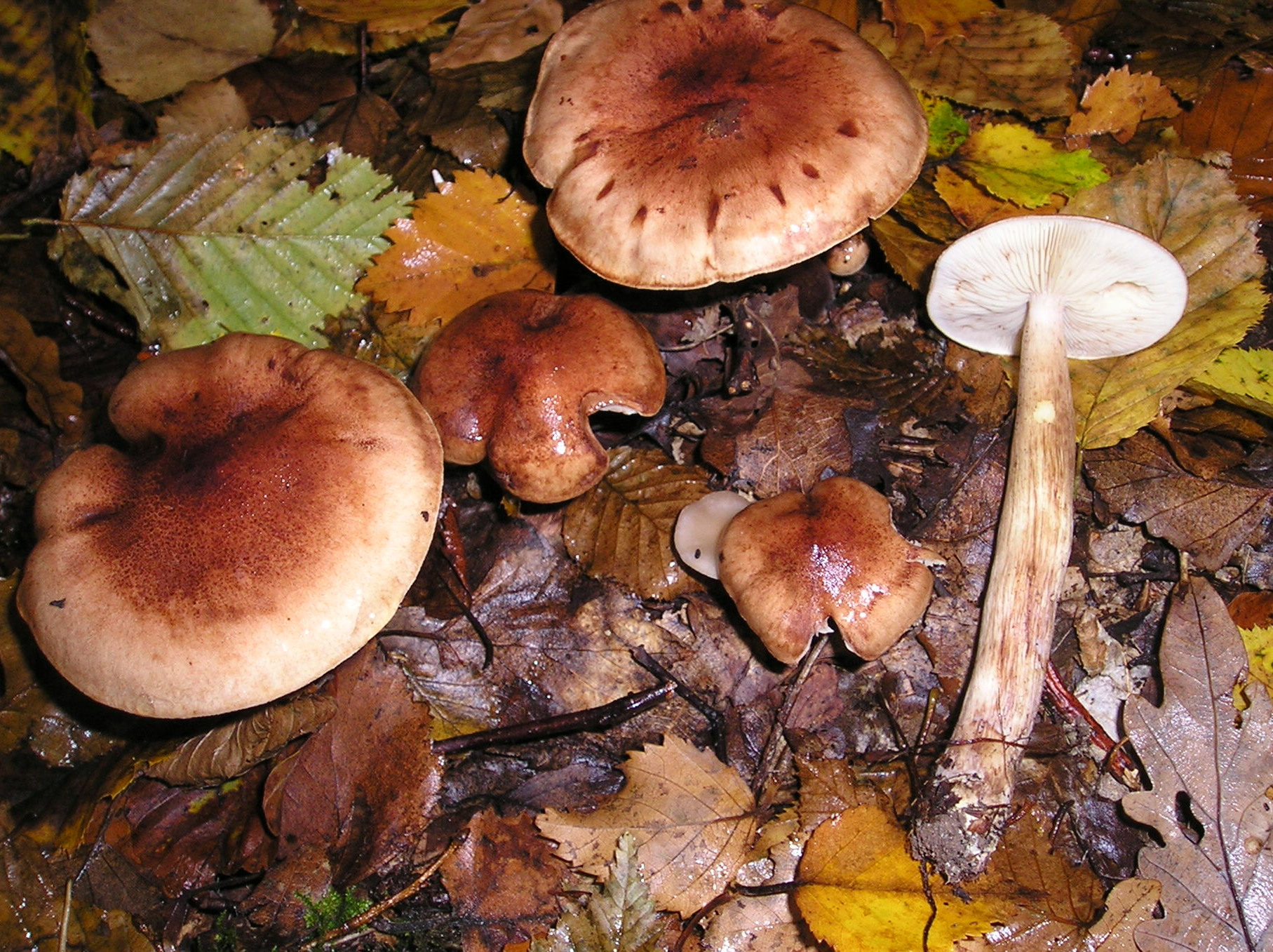
T. fulvum

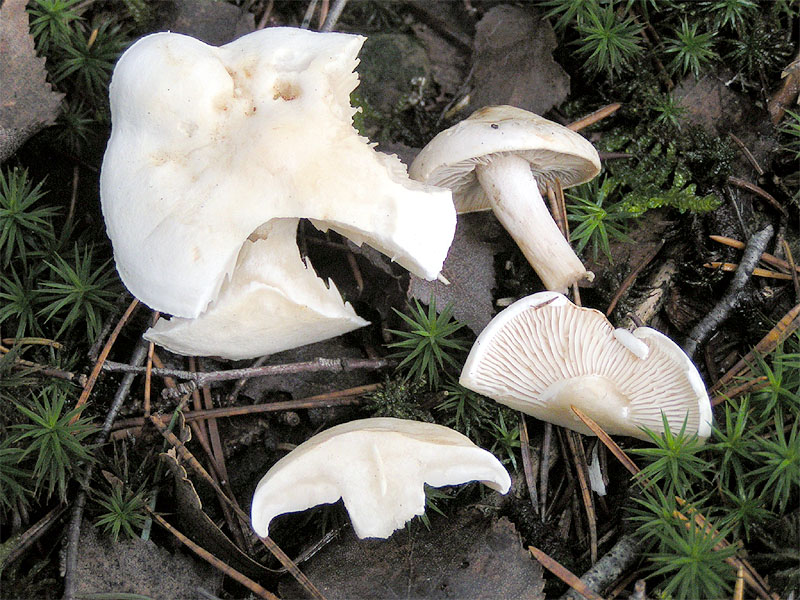
T. lascivum

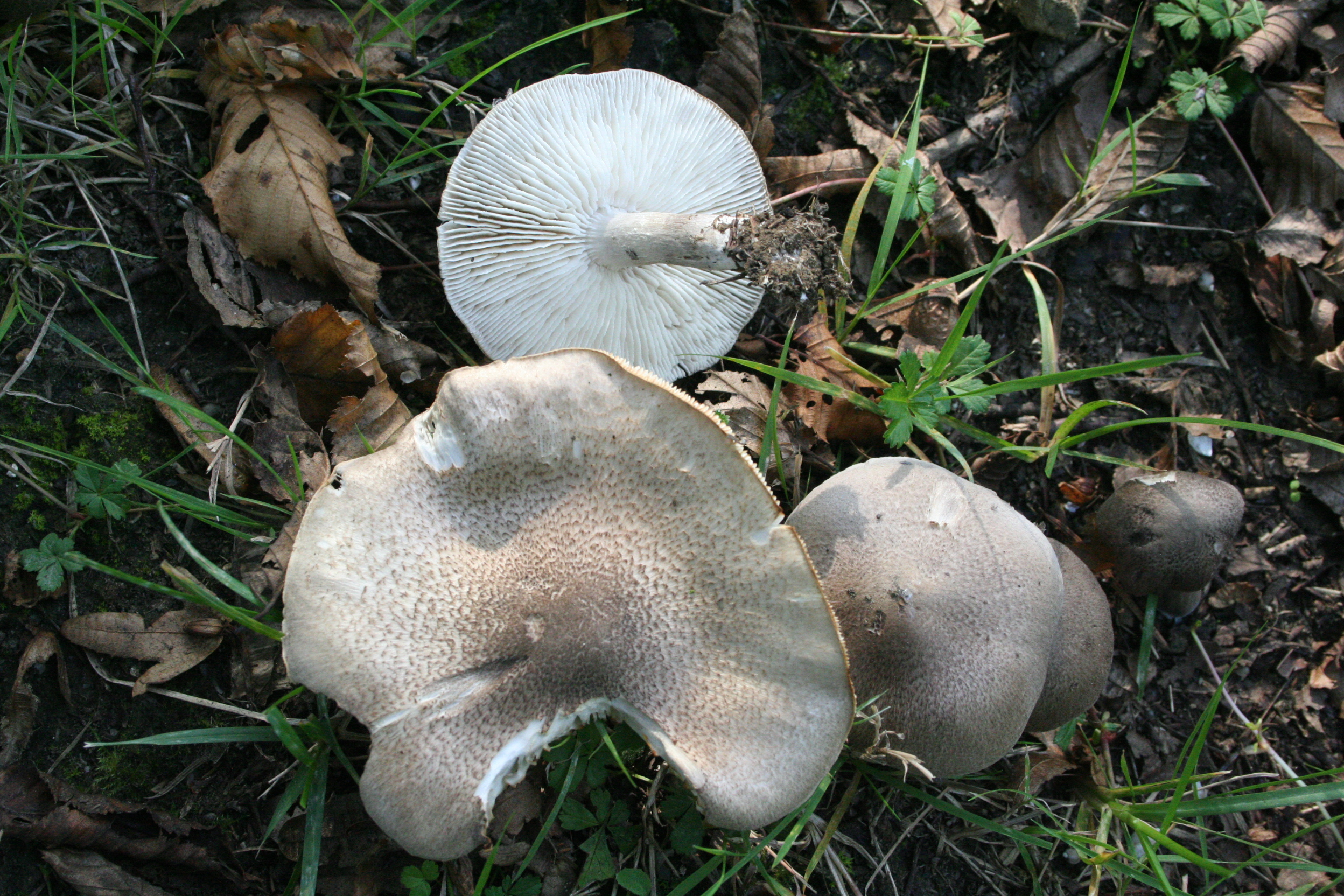
T. scalpuratum

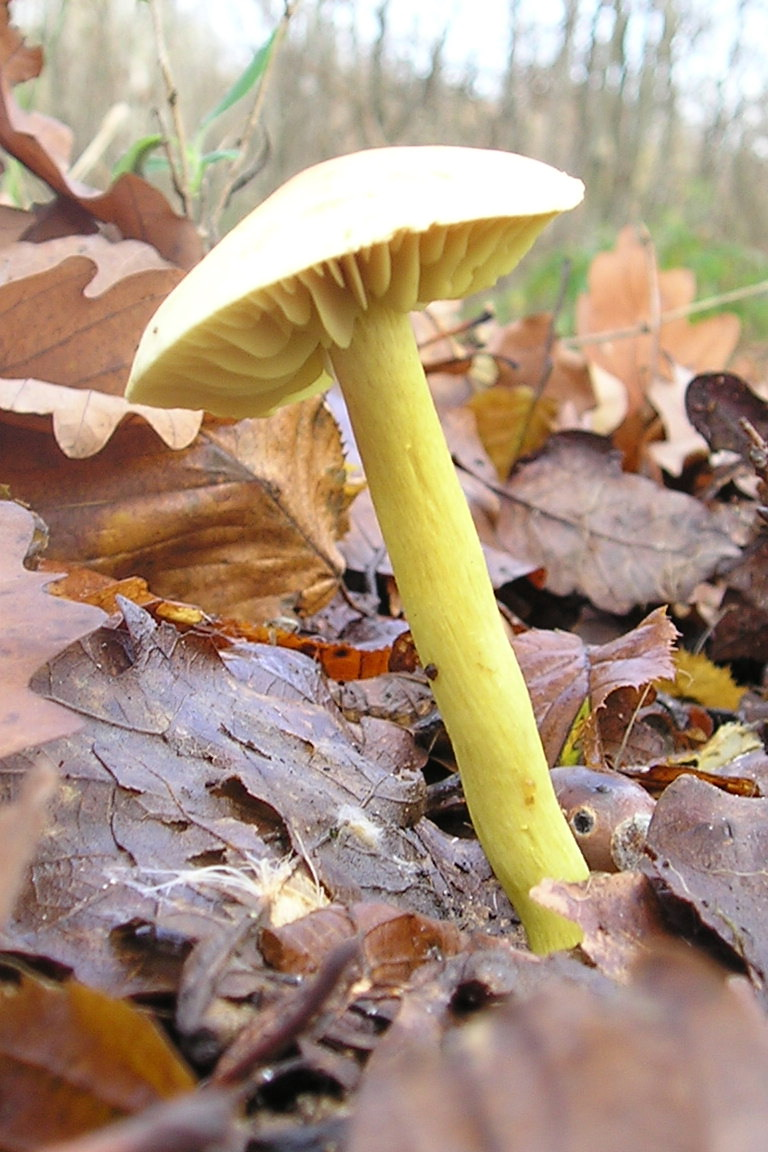
T. sulphureum

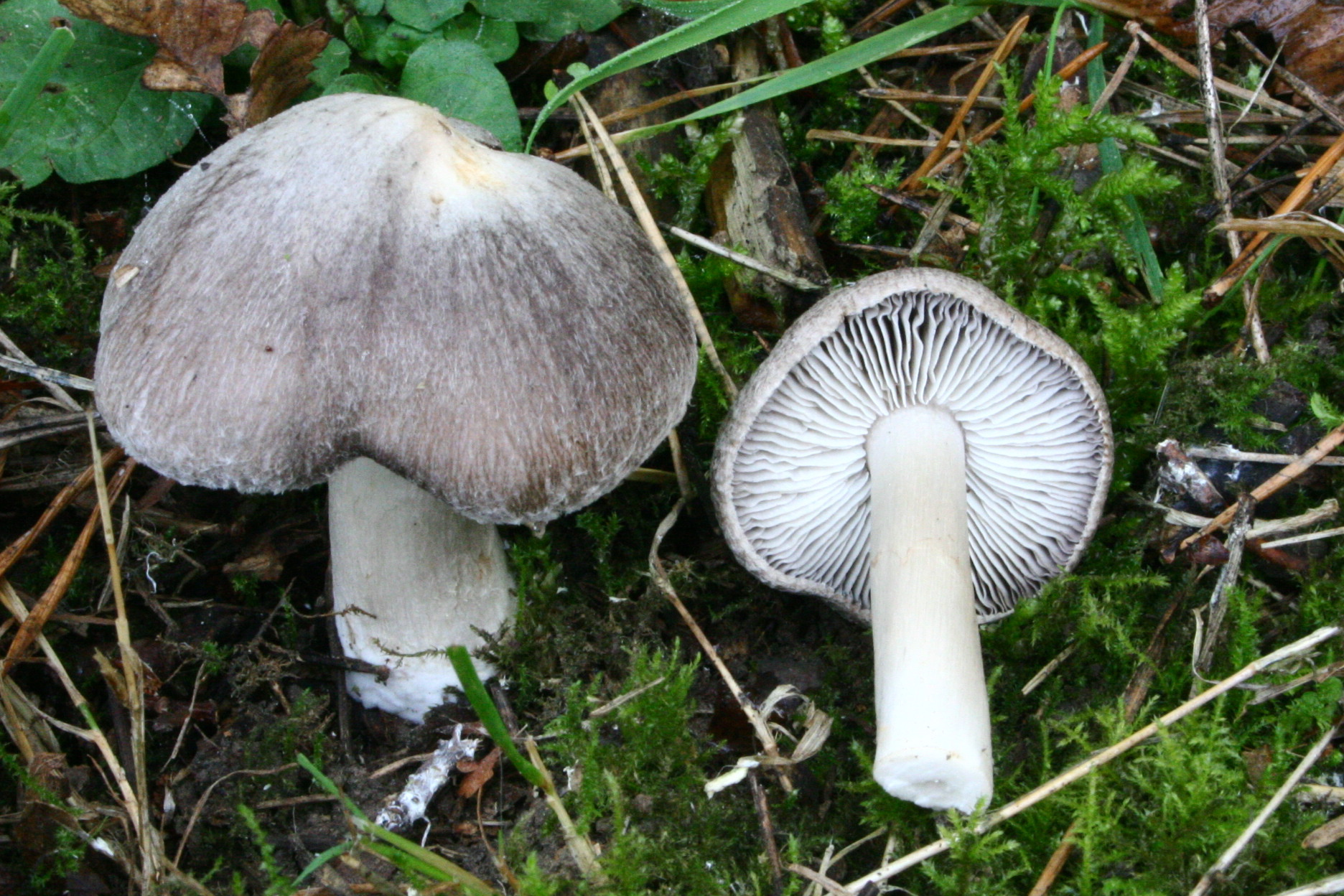
T. terreum (or T. myomyces)

- Tricholoma acerbum – bitter knight
- Tricholoma aestuans – acrid knight
- Tricholoma albobrunneum
- Tricholoma album – white knight
- Tricholoma apium – scented knight
- Tricholoma argyraceum
- Tricholoma arvernense – sovereign knight
- Tricholoma atrosquamosum – dark-scaled knight
- Tricholoma aurantium – orange knight
- Tricholoma auratum – golden Tricholoma
- Tricholoma bakamatsutake
- Tricholoma batschii
- Tricholoma cingulatum – girdled knight
- Tricholoma colossus – giant knight
- Tricholoma columbetta – blue spot knight, dove-coloured Tricholoma
- Tricholoma equestre (previously T. flavovirens) – yellow knight, Man-on-Horseback
- Tricholoma focale - booted knight (Note: Reported to be edible but not palatable)
- Tricholoma fracticum
- Tricholoma fucatum
- Tricholoma fulvum – birch knight
- Tricholoma huronense
- Tricholoma imbricatum – matt knight
- Tricholoma inamoenum – gassy knight
- Tricholoma lascivum – aromatic knight
- Tricholoma magnivelare – pine mushroom, American matsutake
- Tricholoma matsutake – spicy knight, matsutake
- Tricholoma mesoamericanum – Mexican matsutake, hongo blanco de ocote
- Tricholoma murrillianum – Western matsutake
- Tricholoma mutabile
- Tricholoma myomyces
- Tricholoma nigrum
- Tricholoma orirubens
- Tricholoma pardinum
- Tricholoma pessundatum – tacked knight
- Tricholoma populinum – poplar knight
- Tricholoma portentosum – coalman
- Tricholoma psammopus – larch knight
- Tricholoma resplendens
- Tricholoma robustum – robust knight
- Tricholoma roseoacerbum
- Tricholoma saponaceum – soapy knight, soap-scented toadstool
- Tricholoma scalpturatum – yellowing knight
- Tricholoma sciodes – beech knight
- Tricholoma sejunctum – deceiving knight
- Tricholoma squarrulosum
- Tricholoma stans – upright knight
- Tricholoma stiparophyllum - chemical knight
- Tricholoma sulphurescens - yellow staining knight
- Tricholoma sulphureum – sulphur knight, sulphur Tricholoma, gas agaric
- Tricholoma terreum (= T. myomyces) – grey knight
- Tricholoma tigrinum
- Tricholoma ustale – burnt knight
- Tricholoma ustaloides – charred knight
- Tricholoma vaccinum – scaly knight, scaly Tricholoma
- Tricholoma venenatum
- Tricholoma virgatum – ashen knight, streaked Tricholoma
- Tricholoma zangii

== See also ==
- List of North American Tricholoma
- List of Tricholomataceae genera
