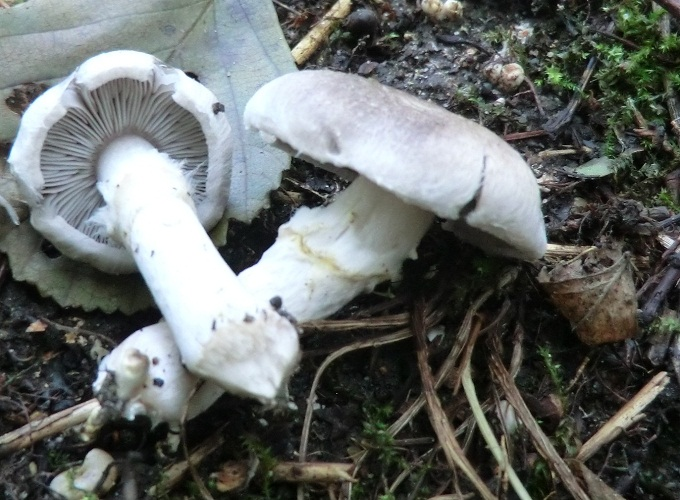

Scientific classification
- Domain: Eukaryota
- Kingdom: Fungi
- Division: Basidiomycota
- Class: Agaricomycetes
- Order: Agaricales
- Family: Tricholomataceae
- Genus: Tricholoma
- Species: T. cingulatum

Binomial name
- Tricholoma cingulatum (Almfelt) Jacobasch (1890)

Synonyms
- Agaricus cingulatus Almfelt (1830); Armillaria cingulata (Almfelt) Quél. (1872)

= Tricholoma cingulatum =

Species of fungus

Tricholoma cingulatum is a mushroom of the agaric genus Tricholoma. First described in 1830 as Agaricus cingulatus by Elias Magnus Fries, it was transferred to the genus Tricholoma by Almfelt in 1830.

== See also ==
- List of North American Tricholoma
- List of Tricholoma species
