= Tricholoma venenatum =

Scientific classification
- Domain: Eukaryota
- Kingdom: Fungi
- Division: Basidiomycota
- Class: Agaricomycetes
- Order: Agaricales
- Family: Tricholomataceae
- Genus: Tricholoma
- Species: T. venenatum

Binomial name
- Tricholoma venenatum G.F.Atk. (1908)

Synonyms
- Melanoleuca venenata (G.F.Atk.) Murrill (1914)

Species of fungus

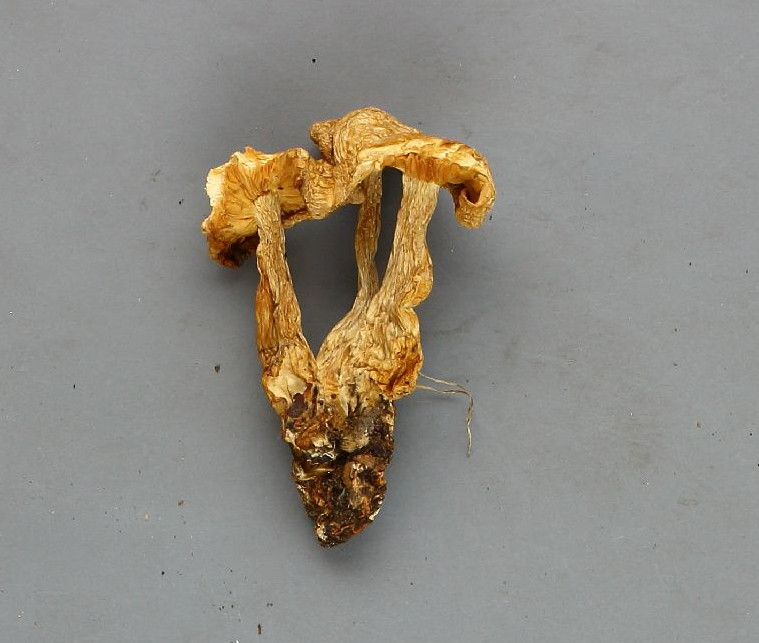
Tricholoma venenatum

Tricholoma venenatum is a mushroom of the agaric genus Tricholoma. It was first described scientifically by American mycologist George F. Atkinson in 1908.

== See also ==
- List of North American Tricholoma
