= August Batsch =

German naturalist (1761–1802)

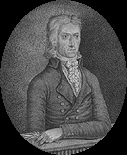
- Born: 28 October 1761; Jena, Duchy of Saxe-Weimar, Holy Roman Empire
- Died: 29 September 1802 (aged 40); Jena, Duchy of Saxe-Weimar, Holy Roman Empire
- Education: University of Jena
- Known for: Fungi, Taxonomy
- Scientific career
- Fields: Botany, Medicine
- Workplaces: University of Jena
- Doctoral students: Johann Wolfgang von Goethe
- Author abbrev. (botany): Batsch

August Johann Georg Karl Batsch (28 October 1761 – 29 September 1802) was a German naturalist. He was a recognised authority on mushrooms, and also described new species of ferns, bryophytes, and seed plants.

== Life and career ==
Batsch was born in Jena, Saxe-Weimar to George Lorenz Bratsch and Ernestine (nee Franke) Bratsch. He studied at the Jena City School, and then had private tuition. He showed an aptitude for natural sciences and drawing, and so subsequently studied medicine and philosophy at the University of Jena (now known as the Friedrich Schiller University of Jena), entering in 1772 and obtaining his doctorate in philosophy in 1781 and in medicine in 1786, his supervisor being Justus Christian Loder. Batsch was married in 1787 to Amalie Pfaundel. They had three children, Friedrich (born 1789), George Friedrich Karl (1792), and Karoline (1795). He died in 1802 after a short illness.

In 1786 Batsch began to teach natural history at the University of Jena and in 1787 he was appointed associate professor of medicine and botany. In 1792 he became Professor of Philosophy. He advised Johann Wolfgang von Goethe on his botanical research. Batsch's organization of plants in progressive forms may have influenced Goethe's thinking on the transmutation of species. In 1790, Batsch founded a botanical garden in Jena, and the Naturforschende Gesellschaft ("Nature Investigator's Club").

== Botany ==
Title page of Dispos. Gen. Pl. Jenens. 1786

Batsch discovered almost 200 new species of mushrooms, including Clitocybe nebularis, Calocera cornea, Paxillus involutus, and Tapinella atrotomentosa. He was a recognised authority writing two books on the topic, Elenchus Fungorum (Discussion of Fungi, between 1783 and 1789), which is still highly rated today and Versuch einer Anleitung zur Kenntniss und Geschichte der Pflanzen (Attempt at Instruction in the Knowledge and History of Plants, between 1787 and 1788). Versuch einer Anleitung... looked into the nature of what we now know to be fungal diseases of plants (such as Dutch elm disease), but without realizing their origin. Rejecting the system of Carl Linnaeus, he began to classify plants on the basis of their external form and shape and to make them generally understandable by means of a clear, precise representation, as best known in his three volume Elenchus Fungorum.While well versed in the flora of the Jena area, the weakness of his system lay in his lesser familiarity with the plants of the rest of the world.

Other works include Dispositio Generum Plantarum Jenensium Secundum Linnaeum et Familias Naturales, Jena 1786, generally referenced as Dispos. Gen. Pl. Jenens., alternatively titled as Dissertatio inauguralis botanica sistens dispositionem generum plantarum Jenensium. His taxonomic classification of plants is summarised in his last work, the Tabula affinitatum regni vegetabilis (1802), which was notable for its diagram depicting the network of affinities within the vegetable kingdom. His Synopsis vniversalis analytica genervm plantarvm (1793–4) is the source for valid names for Melanthiaceae and Primulaceae.

== Zoology ==
Batsch wrote Versuch einer Anleitung, zur Kenntniß und Geschichte der Thiere und Mineralien, für akademische Vorlesungen entworfen, und mit den nöthigsten Abbildungen versehen, in English Provisional guide to the knowledge, development and history of the animals and minerals, designed for academic lectures. The first part (Erster Theil) Allgemeine Geschichte der Natur; besondre der Säugthiere, Vögel, Amphibien und Fische German natural history, mammals, birds amphibians and fish appeared in 1788.Part two (Zweyter Theil). Besondre Geschichte der Insekten, Gewürme und Mineralien on insects, worms and minerals was published in the following year, 1789. He was also known for his work on turtles.

== Selected publications ==
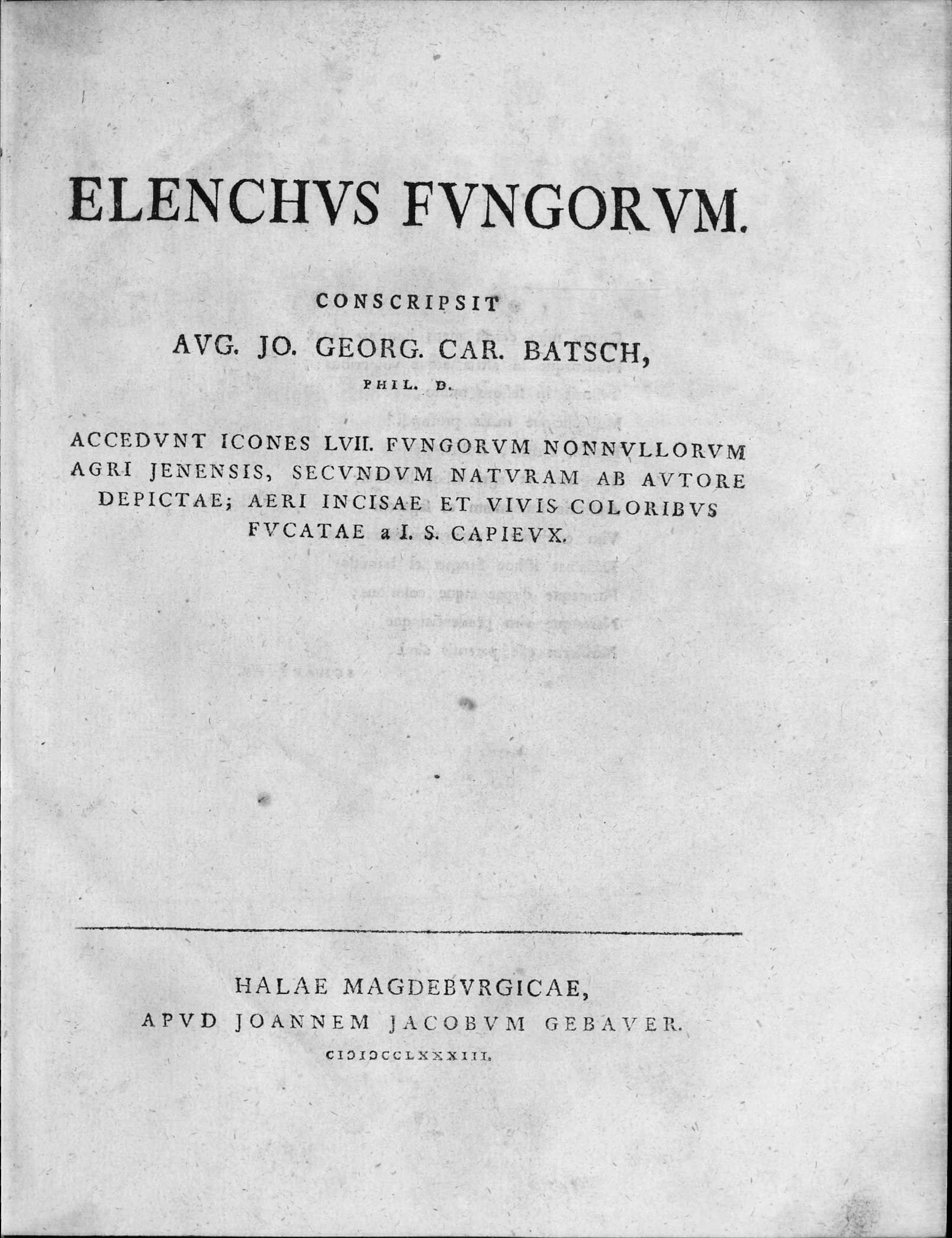
Elenchus fungorum, 1783

- Elenchus fungorum (in Latin). Halle: Johann Jakob Gebauer. 1783.
- Elenchi fungorum continuatio prima (in Latin). Halle: Johann Jakob Gebauer. 1786.
- Elenchi fungorum continuatio secunda (in Latin). Halle: Johann Jakob Gebauer. 1789.
- Batsch, August Johann Georg Karl (1802). Tabula affinitatum regni vegetabilis, quam delineavit, et nunc ulterius adumbratam (in Latin). Weimar: Landes-Industrie-Comptoir.
- Batsch, August Johann Georg Karl (1793–1794). Synopsis vniversalis analytica genervm plantarvm fere omnivm hvcvsque cognitorum qvam secvndvm methodvm sexvalem corollinam, et carpologicam adivnctis ordinibvs naturalibvs adhibitis vltra Linnaeana monitis et adavctionibvs meritissimorvm Avbletii, Lovreirii, Forskolii, Thvnbergii, Forsteri, Vahlii, Gaertneri, Hedwigii, Schreberi, Ivssievii, Swarzii, et aliorum. 2 vols (in Latin). Ienae: Svmtibvs Bibliopolii Croekeriani.

== Legacy ==
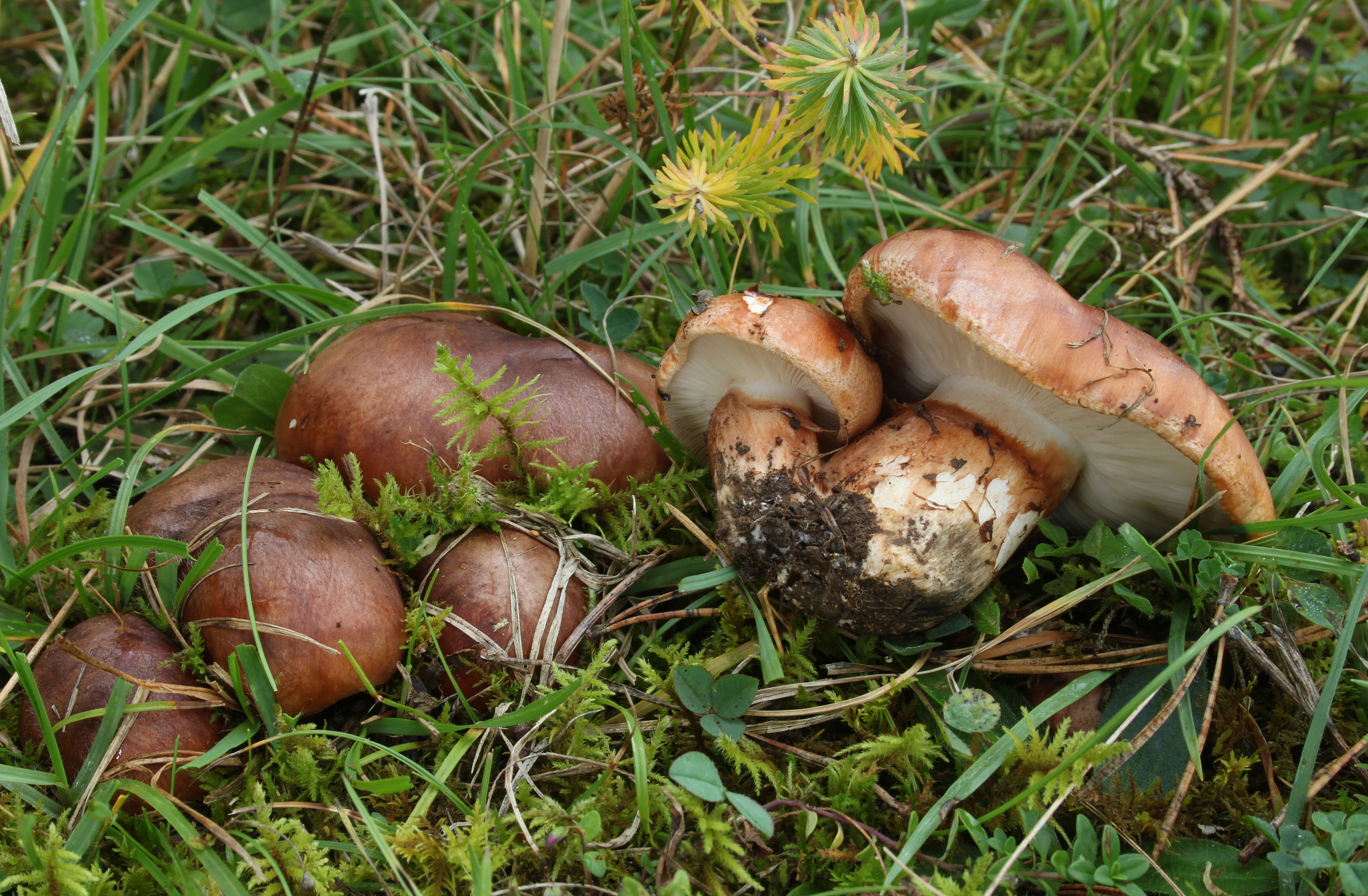
The fungus Tricholoma batschii, named after Batsch.

Batsch is considered one of the most important late eighteenth century naturalists in central Germany. The fungal species Tricholoma batschii is named after him.

== See also ==
- List of mycologists

== Bibliography ==
- Angiosperm Phylogeny Group IV; Chase, M. W.; Christenhusz, J. M.; Fay, M. F.; Byng, J. W.; Judd, W. S.; Soltis, D. E.; Mabberley, D. J.; Sennikov, A. N.; Soltis, P. S.; Stevens, P. R. (2016), "An update of the Angiosperm Phylogeny Group classification for the orders and families of flowering plants: APG IV", Botanical Journal of the Linnean Society, 181 (1): 1–20, doi:10.1111/boj.12385
- Dubois, Alain; Bour, Roger (2010). "The distinction between family-series and class-series nomina in zoological nomenclature, with emphasis on the nomina created by Batsch (1788, 1789) and on the higher nomenclature of turtles". Bonn Zoological Bulletin. 57: 149–171.
- Ragan, Mark A (2009). "Trees and networks before and after Darwin". Biology Direct. 4 (1): 43. doi:10.1186/1745-6150-4-43. PMC 2793248. PMID 19917100.
- Dittrich, Silvio (2010). "Biografie von August Batsch (1761-1802)". Sächsische Biografie (in German). Sächsische Geschichte und Volkskunde e.V.
- Plate Plate from Elenchus fungorum.
- Text of Elenchus Fungorum (German)
- University of Jena botanical garden
- Texts of works available at BHL
