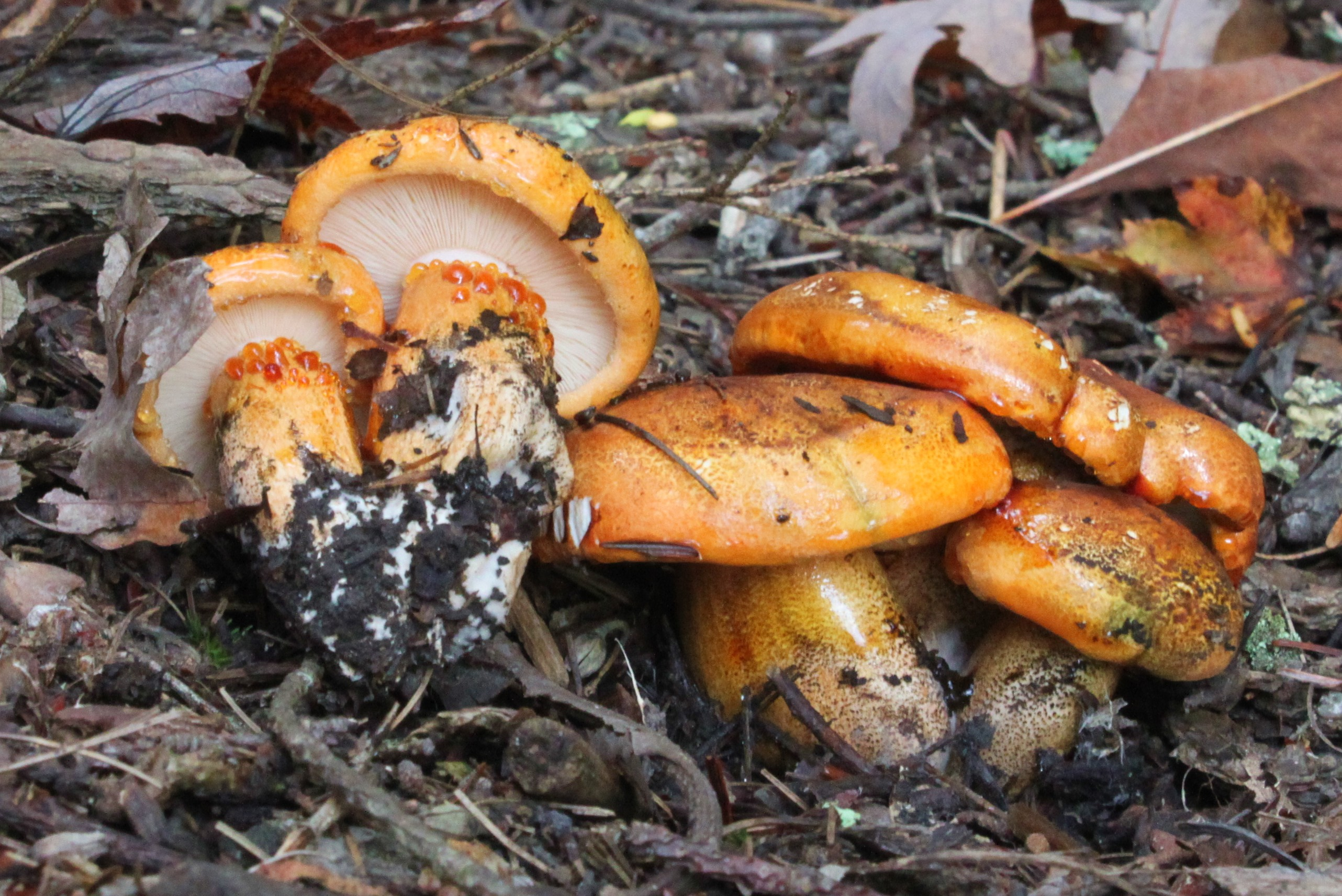

Scientific classification
- Kingdom: Fungi
- Division: Basidiomycota
- Class: Agaricomycetes
- Order: Agaricales
- Family: Tricholomataceae
- Genus: Tricholoma
- Species: T. aurantium

Binomial name
- Tricholoma aurantium (Schaeff.) Ricken (1915)

Synonyms
- Agaricus aurantius Schaeff. (1774)

= Tricholoma aurantium =

Species of fungus

Tricholoma aurantium
- Mycological characteristics
- Gills on hymenium
- Cap is convex or umbonate
- Hymenium is adnate or adnexed
- Stipe is bare
- Spore print is white
- Ecology is mycorrhizal
- Edibility is inedible or edible, but unpalatable

Tricholoma aurantium, commonly known as the golden orange tricholoma, is a species of agaric fungus in the genus Tricholoma.

== Taxonomy ==
Originally described by Jacob Christian Schäffer in 1774, it was transferred to the genus Tricholoma by Adalbert Ricken in 1915.

== Description ==
The cap is broadly convex to more or less flat, measuring 3–10 cm (1.2–3.9 in) wide with a margin that is initially rolled inward. Fresh specimens are sticky or slimy. The cap color is orange to dull reddish-orange. Parts that have been handled bruise dark red. The initially smooth surface can break into a matrix of fibrils and scales. The closely spaced gills are whitish, but develop brownish to reddish-brown stains in maturity. They are adnate to adnexed, sometimes notched. The often hollow stipe measures 4–8 cm (1.6–3.1 in) long by 1–2 cm (0.4–0.8 in) thick, and is either roughly the same width throughout, or tapers slightly to the base. Its surface is covered with dense orangish scales that terminate in a line near the top of the stipe, where it is white. The white, mealy tasting flesh does not change color with injury. The odour is unpleasantly farinaceous.

The spore print is white. The spores are smooth, ellipsoid, and inamyloid, measuring 5–6 by 3–4 μm. The mushroom is inedible due to its extreme unpalatibility.

== Habitat and distribution ==
The fruit bodies grow scattered or in groups or clusters on the ground with various species of conifers, with which it has a mycorrhizal relationship.

It is widely distributed in North America. It is found in Asia (India, Pakistan). The ectomycorrhizae of T. aurantium has been reported with Pinus wallichiana and Abies pindrow in Pakistan, and with Abies alba (silver fir) in Italy.

== Chemistry ==
The fruit bodies contains the novel diterpene lactone compounds trichoaurantianolides A, B, C and D. The bright orange-red color is due to the benzotropolone pigment aurantricholone. The first total synthesis of trichoaurantianolides C and D was reported in 2015.

== See also ==
- List of North American Tricholoma
- List of Tricholoma species
