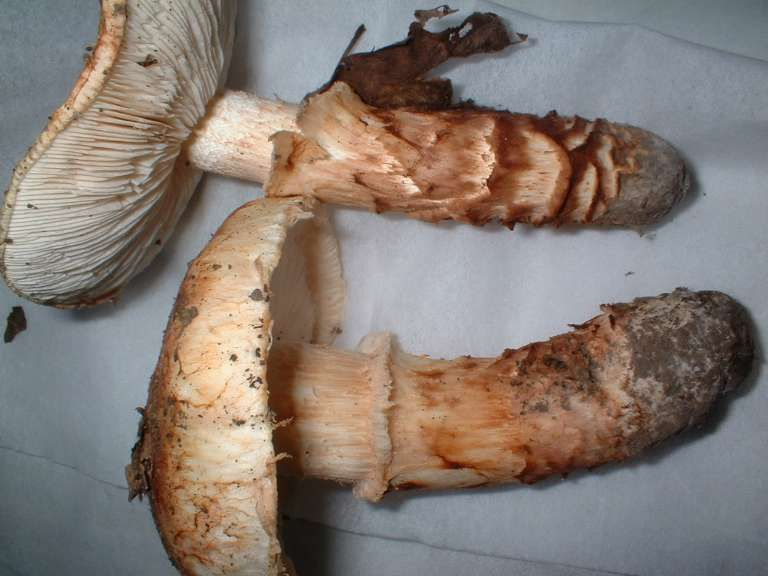

Scientific classification
- Domain: Eukaryota
- Kingdom: Fungi
- Division: Basidiomycota
- Class: Agaricomycetes
- Order: Agaricales
- Family: Tricholomataceae
- Genus: Tricholoma
- Species: T. bakamatsutake

Binomial name
- Tricholoma bakamatsutake Hongo (1974)

= Tricholoma bakamatsutake =

Species of fungus

Tricholoma bakamatsutake or 'bakamatsutake (literally "fool's matsutake") is a mushroom of the agaric genus Tricholoma. Found in China and Japan, it was described as new to science by mycologist Tsuguo Hongo in 1974. It is closely related to the matsutake (pine mushroom) Tricholoma matsutake, but occurs in Fagaceae forests (beeches and oaks) rather than pine forests.

== See also ==
- List of Tricholoma species
- Baka (Japanese word)
