= Tricholoma mutabile =

Scientific classification
- Domain: Eukaryota
- Kingdom: Fungi
- Division: Basidiomycota
- Class: Agaricomycetes
- Order: Agaricales
- Family: Tricholomataceae
- Genus: Tricholoma
- Species: T. mutabile

Binomial name
- Tricholoma mutabile Shanks (1996)
- Known only from Yuba County, California

Species of fungus

Tricholoma mutabile is a mushroom of the agaric genus Tricholoma. Found in Yuba County, California, it was first described scientifically in 1996. It has a grayish convex cap that is 3 to 9 cm (1.2 to 3.5 in) wide, a white stalk measuring 5 to 10 cm (2.0 to 3.9 in) long by 0.9 to 2.5 cm (0.4 to 1.0 in) thick. The white gills are sinuate, and turn pale golden brown in maturity.

== See also ==
- List of North American Tricholoma
- List of Tricholoma species
