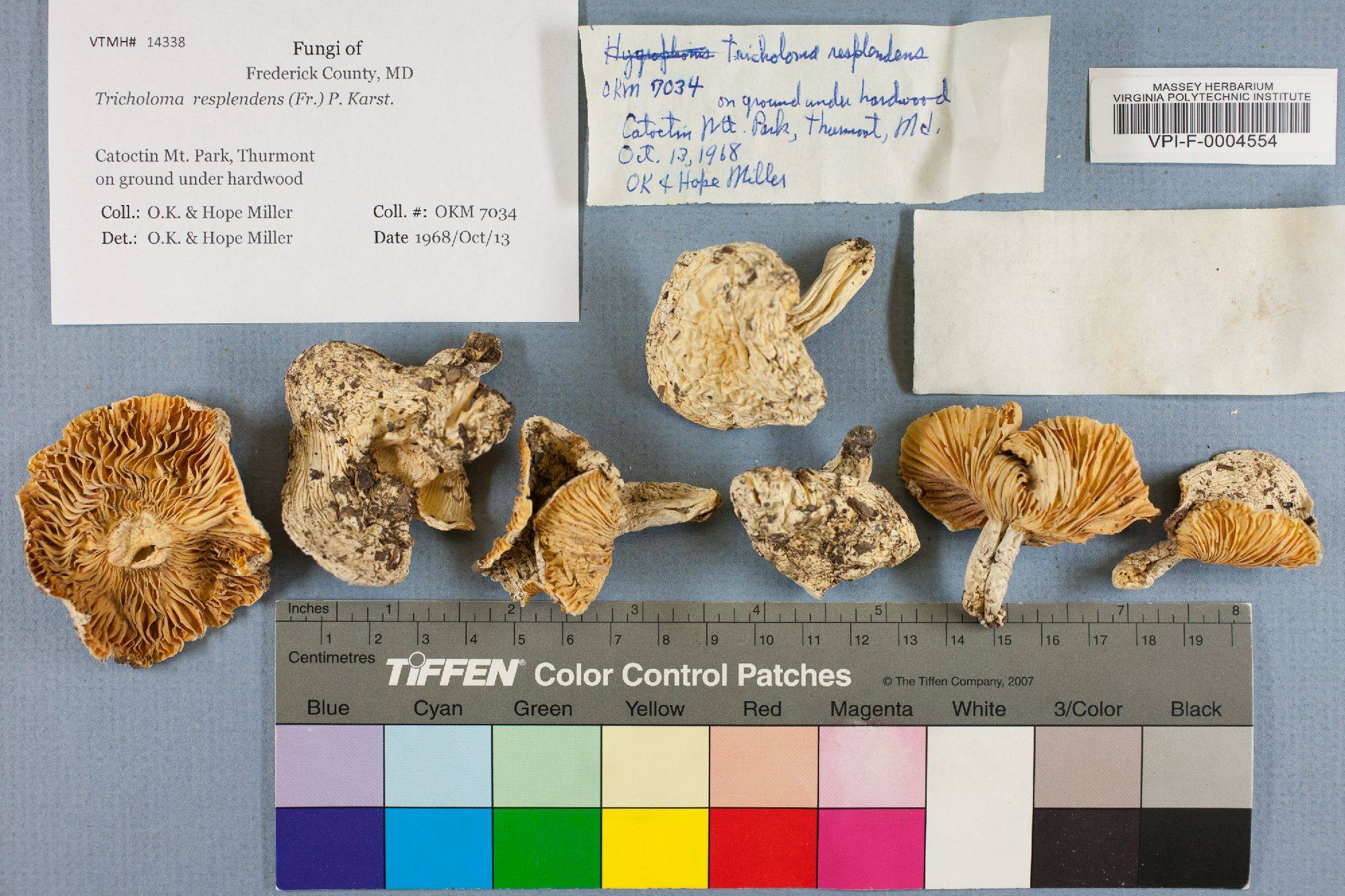

Scientific classification
- Kingdom: Fungi
- Division: Basidiomycota
- Class: Agaricomycetes
- Order: Agaricales
- Family: Tricholomataceae
- Genus: Tricholoma
- Species: T. resplendens

Binomial name
- Tricholoma resplendens (Fr.) P.Karst. 1876

= Tricholoma resplendens =

Species of fungus

Tricholoma resplendens is a fungus of the genus Tricholoma native to Europe and North America. It was originally described as Agaricus resplendens by Elias Magnus Fries in 1857 and was given its current name by Petter Adolf Karsten in 1876.

The white cap is up to 10 centimetres (4 in) wide, sometimes with a yellowish center. The stalk is up to 8 cm long and 2.5 cm thick.

The species has no odor and is part of a group of Tricholoma species containing toxins which can cause severe gastrointestinal upset.
