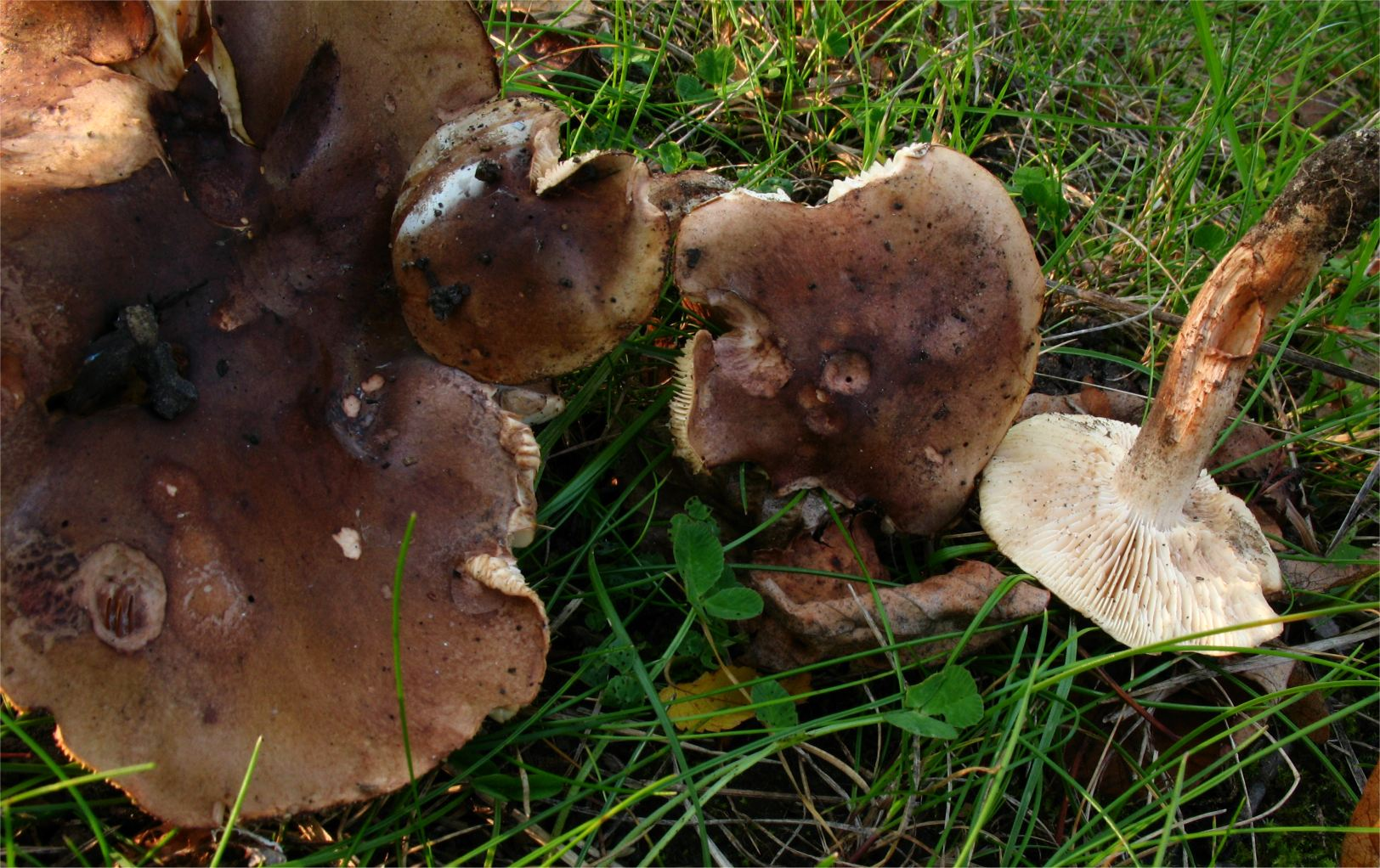

Scientific classification
- Domain: Eukaryota
- Kingdom: Fungi
- Division: Basidiomycota
- Class: Agaricomycetes
- Order: Agaricales
- Family: Tricholomataceae
- Genus: Tricholoma
- Species: T. ustaloides

Binomial name
- Tricholoma ustaloides Romagn. (1954)

= Tricholoma ustaloides =

Species of fungus

Tricholoma ustaloides Mycological characteristics
- Gills on hymenium
- Cap is convex
- Hymenium is adnexed or adnate
- Stipe is bare
- Spore print is white
- Ecology is mycorrhizal
- Edibility is inedible

Tricholoma ustaloides is a species of mushroom in the large genus Tricholoma. It has a widespread distribution in Europe, where it is typically found in association with oak and beech trees. Although generally considered inedible, it is consumed by some in Mexico.

== Description ==
The cap is red-brown or chestnut-brown with a paler margin, very sticky when moist, and has a diameter of 4 to 8 cm (1.6 to 3.1 in). The overall shape of the cap is bell-like when young, later flattening to a more irregular convex shape in maturity, and often developing a lobed appearance. The margins of the caps are usually turned inwards. The gills are crowded together, adnate or emarginate in attachment to the stipe, and white or a light ochraceous yellow with dark brown stains when old or bruised. The stipe is 4 to 10 cm (1.6 to 3.9 in) long by 1 to 2 cm (0.4 to 0.8 in) thick, roughly spindle-shaped (fusiform), with red-brown fibrils and a sharply defined zone of white color at the stalk apex, especially in more mature specimens. The flesh is white or cream, smelling strongly of meal, with a bitter taste.

Spores have a roughly spherical or ellipsoid shape, are hyaline, smooth, non-amyloid, and have dimensions of 5.5—7.0 x 4.5—5.5 μm. Basidia are 4-spored and cystidia are absent.

== Habitat and distribution ==
This mycorrhizal species typically grows in small groups, and is often found near trees in the genera Quercus and Fagus.

Although relatively rare, it has a widespread distribution in Europe, limited by the presence of its preferred tree hosts. Its first recorded appearance in Mexico was 1984.

== Edibility ==
Despite its inedible status by some sources, Tricholoma ustaloides is consumed by the inhabitants of Ajusco and Topilejo, communities near Mexico City.

== See also ==
- List of North American Tricholoma
- List of Tricholoma species
