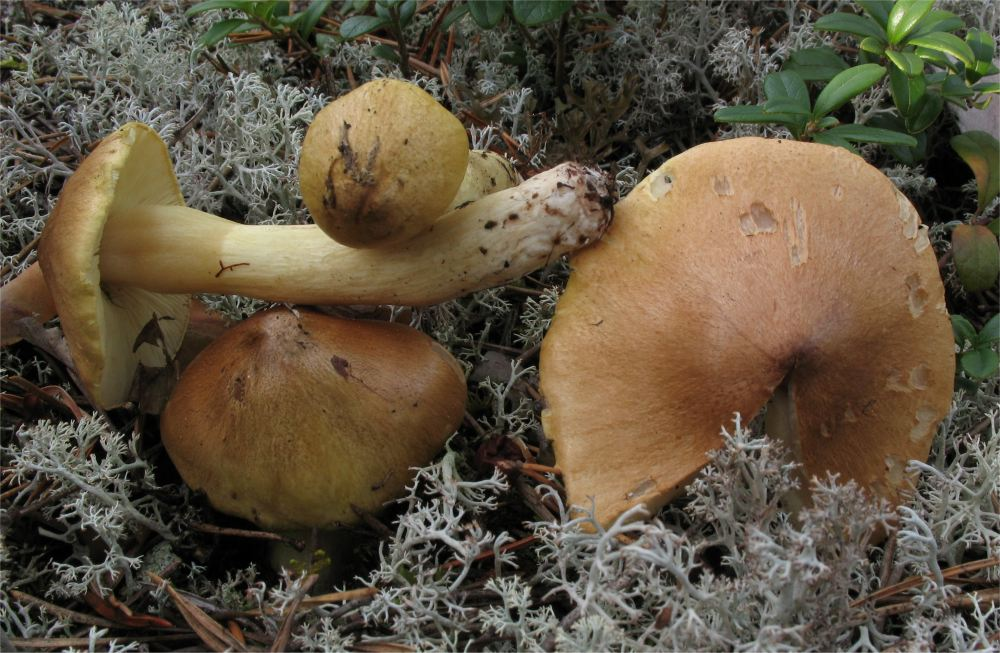

Scientific classification
- Kingdom: Fungi
- Division: Basidiomycota
- Class: Agaricomycetes
- Order: Agaricales
- Family: Tricholomataceae
- Genus: Tricholoma
- Species: T. aestuans

Binomial name
- Tricholoma aestuans (Fr.) Gillet (1874)

Synonyms
- Agaricus aestuans Fr. (1821); Gyrophila aestuans (Fr.) Quél. (1886)

= Tricholoma aestuans =

Species of fungus

Tricholoma aestuans is a mushroom of the agaric genus Tricholoma. First described formally by Elias Magnus Fries in 1821, it was transferred to the genus Tricholoma by Claude Casimir Gillet in 1874.

It has an appressed-fibrillose cap that is usually about 4-7 centimeters in diameter. The stipe is about 5-10 centimeters long and 1-2 centimeters wide. It is whitish to grayish in color. The gills are greenish in color. They are notched. The scent is sour and farinaceous.

== See also ==
- List of North American Tricholoma
- List of Tricholoma species
