= Bonn Zoological Bulletin =

The Bonn Zoological Bulletin (BzB), formerly Bonner zoologische Beiträge, is a peer reviewed open access journal dealing with zoology.
