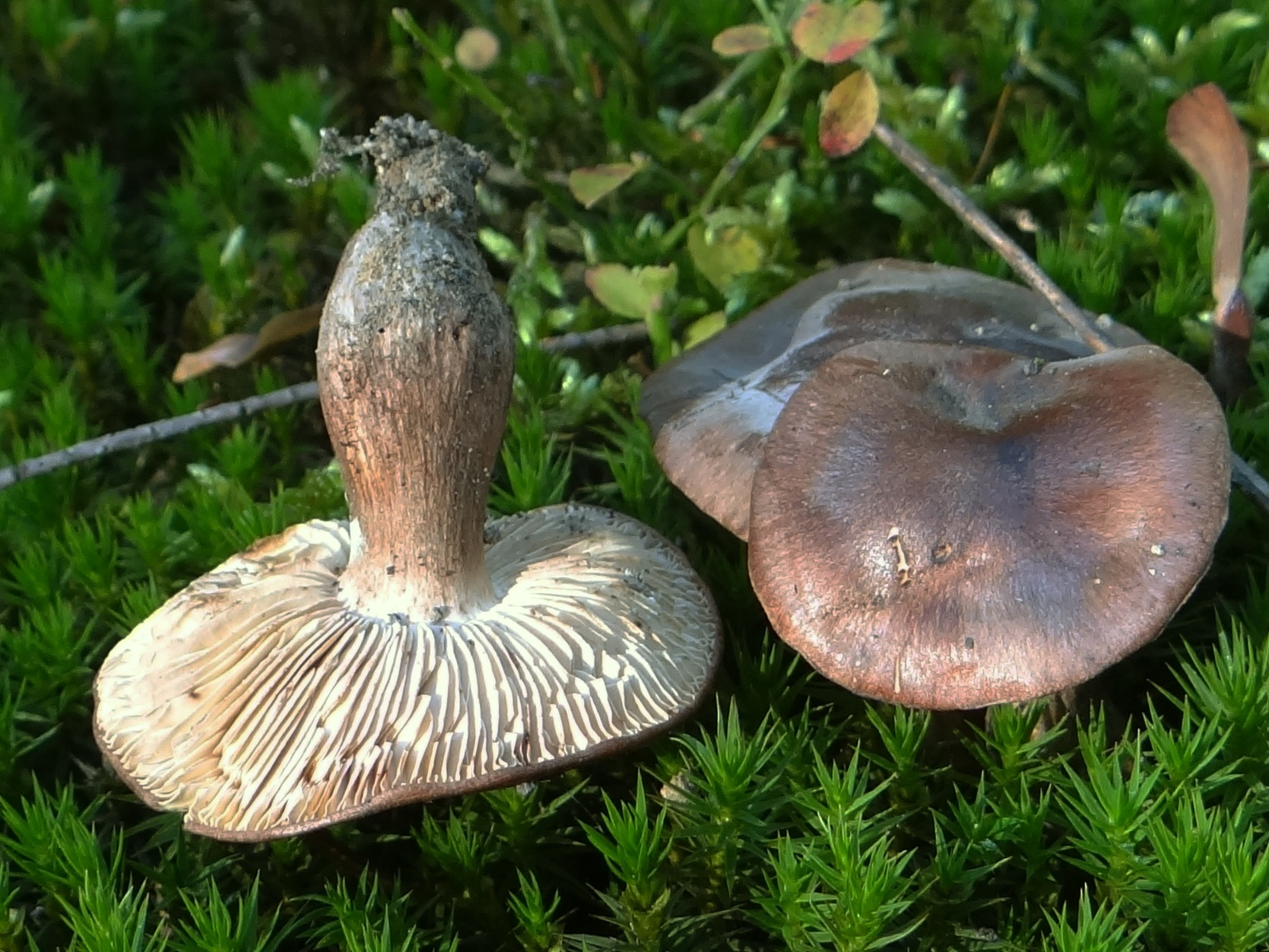

Scientific classification
- Domain: Eukaryota
- Kingdom: Fungi
- Division: Basidiomycota
- Class: Agaricomycetes
- Order: Agaricales
- Family: Tricholomataceae
- Genus: Tricholoma
- Species: T. batschii

Binomial name
- Tricholoma batschii Gulden ex Mort. Chr. & Noordel. (1999)

Synonyms
- Tricholoma batschii Gulden (1969)

= Tricholoma batschii =

Species of fungus

Tricholoma batschii is a species of fungus belonging to the family Tricholomataceae.

It is found in Europe.
