= Jacob Christian Schäffer =

German inventor, professor, botanist, entomologist and ornithologist (1718–1790)

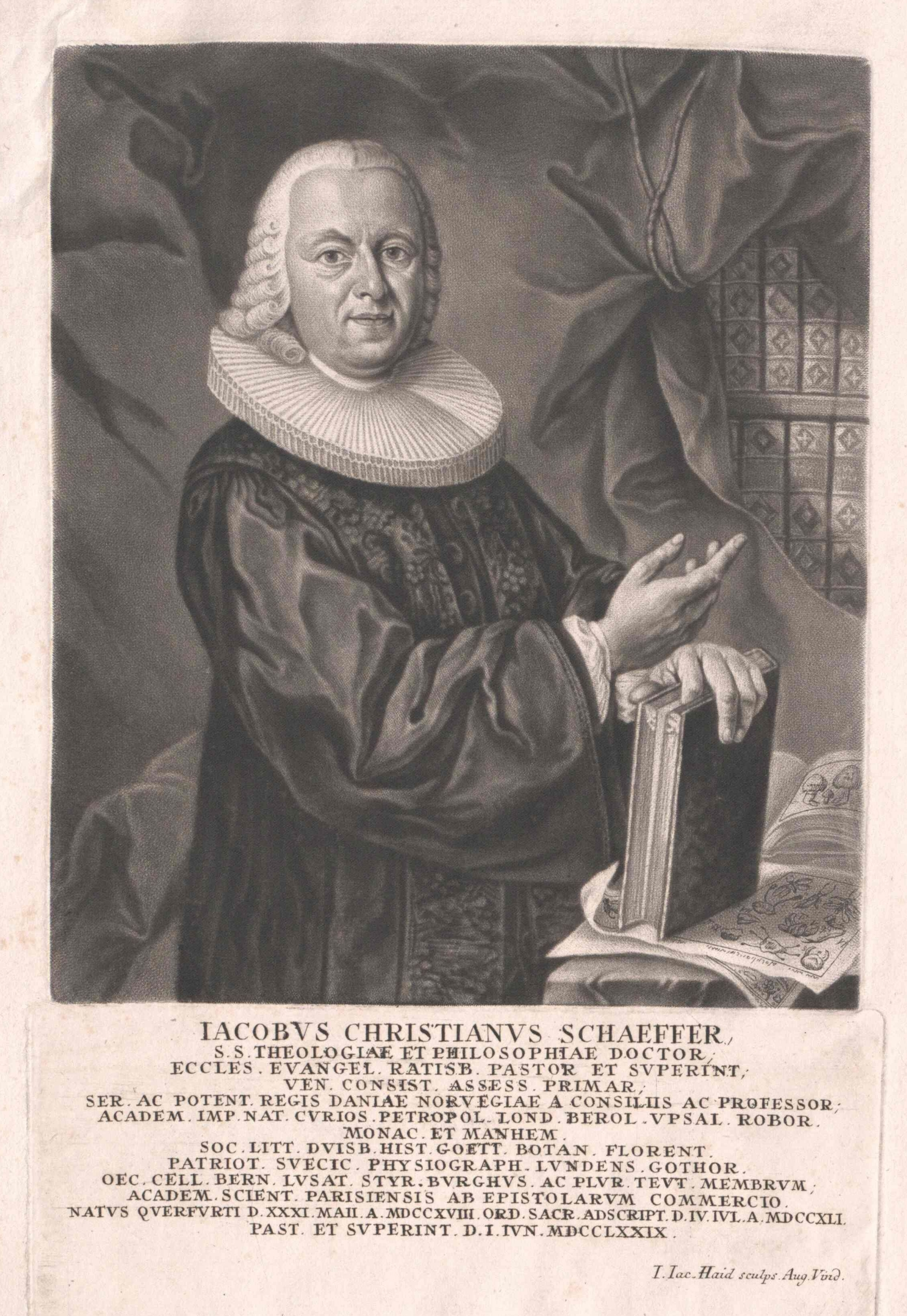
- Jacob Christian Schäffer
- Born: 31 May 1718; Querfurt
- Died: 5 January 1790 (aged 71)
- Scientific career
- Fields: Mycology; Entomology; Ornithology

Jacob Christian Schäffer, alternatively Jakob, (31 May 1718 – 5 January 1790) was a German dean, professor of theology, botanist, mycologist, entomologist, ornithologist, and inventor. He was a theologian and teacher at Ratisbon. His work in natural sciences includes writing comprehensive and illustrated volumes on plants, fungi, birds, and insects, proposing new classification systems, and maintaining a museum of curiosities. Schäffer also experimented with electricity, colours, optics, and manufactured prisms and lenses, and invented an early washing machine and other practical devices. In the paper industry, he conducted experiments and published findings on alternate sources for paper production. He made studies of minute organisms without access to advanced microscopes and wrote a book on Daphnia.

== Biography ==
Schäffer was born in Querfurt, near Halle. A younger brother, Johan Gottlieb, trained as a pharmacist in 1734 and worked in Regensburg. Jacob did not train in science. He studied at Halle in the French School of Latin. From 1736 to 1738, he studied theology at the University of Halle and then worked with a merchant in Regensburg. After the death of his employer, he received an offer in 1741 in the pastorate of Regensburg. In 1760, the university of Wittenberg gave him the title of doctor of philosophy, and the University of Tübingen awarded him in 1763 the title of doctor of divinity. In 1741, he became a pastor of a Protestant parish. In 1779, while still a pastor, he also became the dean of the Protestant parish in Ratisbon.

Although he himself did not study science, he supported his brother's studies in medicine at Altdorf before establishing a practice in Regensburg in 1745. Two sons of Johan's became physicians, both writing on medicine. He married Susanna Weißböck (d. 1746) in 1743. Emanuel Theophil Harrer (1714–67) was a brother-in-law and an influence for his natural history work. After the death of his first wife in 1746, he married again in 1759.

== Works ==
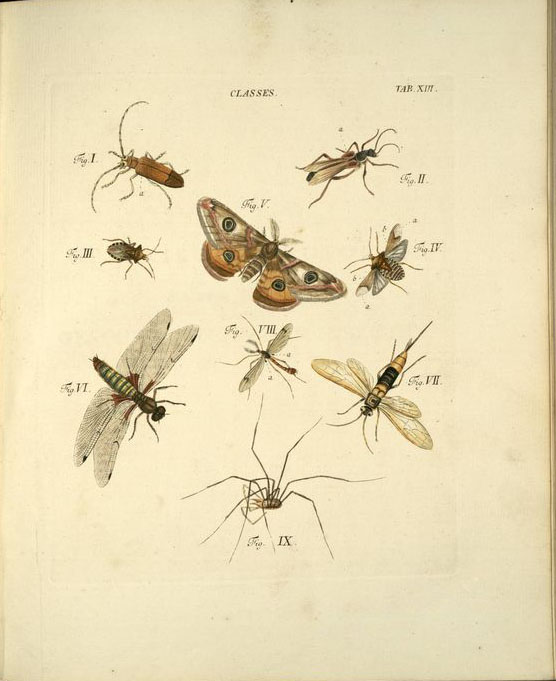
Plate from Elementa entomologica

In 1759, Schäffer published Erleichterte Artzney-Kräuterwissenschaft, a handbook of botany and the medicinal effects of plants for doctors and pharmacists. From 1762 to 1764, he wrote four richly illustrated volumes on mycology, Natürlich ausgemahlten Abbildungen baierischer und pfälzischer Schwämme, welche um Regensburg wachsen. In 1774, he wrote Elementa Ornithologica, in which he proposed a system of classification of the birds based on the structure of their legs. This work was followed by Museum Ornithologicum in 1789, in which he described the birds in his collection. In 1779, Schäffer published the three-volume work Icones insectorum circa ratisbonam indigenorum coloribus naturam referentibus expressae, which included 280 hand-coloured plates of copper engravings, illustrating approximately 3,000 insects. An introduction to entomology, Elementa entomologica, followed in 1789.

Jacob Christian Schäffers erleichterte Arzneykräuterwissenschaft: nebst vier Kupfertafeln mit ausgemahlten Abbildungen. Montag, Regensburg 2. Aufl. 1770 Digital edition by the University and State Library Düsseldorf

== Other achievements ==
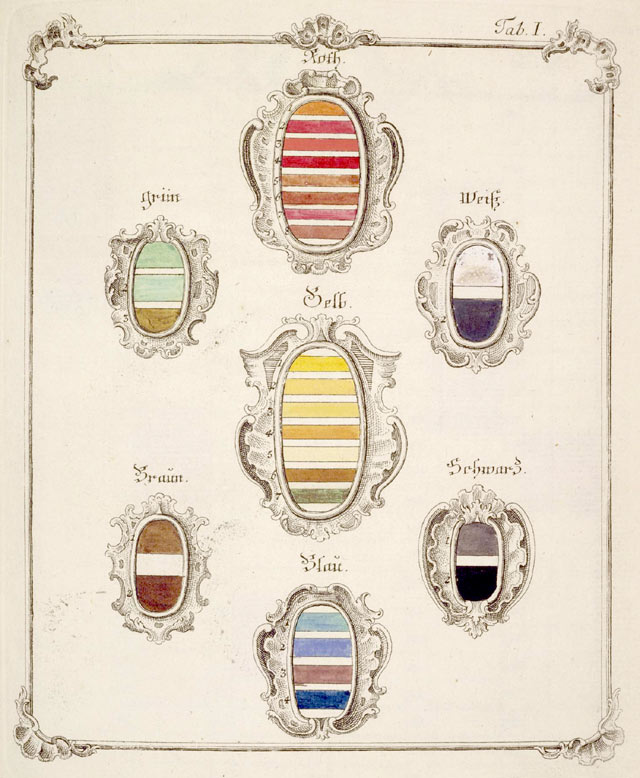
Schäffer's color samples of the seven simple and natural principal colours

Schäffer organised a rich personal cabinet of curiosities, the Schaefferianum Museum, opened to the public and which Goethe (1749–1832) visited in 1786 at the time of the "voyage", which led him to Italy. He was a member of many learned societies such as those of Göttingen, Mannheim, Saint-Petersburg, London and Uppsala. He was a corresponding member of the Académie des sciences (Academy of Science) of Paris and joined, in 1757, the Kaiserlich-Carolinische Akademie der Naturforscher, and two years later took part in the foundation of the Bayerischen Akademie der Wissenschaften. Schäffer maintained a correspondence with many naturalists including Carl von Linné (1707–1778) and René Antoine Ferchault de Réaumur (1683–1757). In Feb 1764 he was elected a fellow of the Royal Society.

Natural history was not the only field that interested him. He conducted experiments on electricity, colours, and optics. He remains famous for his manufacturing of prisms and lenses. He invented an early washing machine, for which he published designs in 1767: Die bequeme und höchstvortheilhafte Waschmaschine. His other inventions included a saw and furnaces. The paper industry also interested him, and between 1765 and 1771, the results of his observations and experiments were published as Versuche und Muster, ohne alle Lumpen oder doch mit einem geringen Zusatze derselben, Papier zu machen. It discussed, in particular, the manufacture of paper using various plants, such as the poplar, moss, and hop, which might not have been used by the paper pulp manufacturers without his experimental work.

In his book Die eingebildeten Wurmer in Zahnen nebst dem vermeyntlichen Hülfsmittel wider dieselben (1757, The Imaginary worms in teeth, with the presumed means of dispensing them), he argued against the contemporary theory that toothache was caused by minute worms. It had become a practice among physicians to use means for ridding the worms to cure toothache. These approaches included smoked henbane seeds, using hot water in the mouth, and so on. The flushed water was claimed to have had the worms in them. He examined the debris and found that the so-called worms were henbane seeds.

== See also ==
- Category:Taxa named by Jacob Christian Schäffer

== Sources ==
- Eckart Roloff: Jacob Christian Schäffer. Der Regensburger Humboldt wird zum Pionier für Waschmaschinen, Pilze und Papier. In: Eckart Roloff: Göttliche Geistesblitze. Pfarrer und Priester als Erfinder und Entdecker. Wiley-VCH, Weinheim 2010, p. 159–182, ISBN 978-3-527-32578-8. 2. edition 2012 (Paperback) ISBN 978-3-527-32864-2 (in German)
- Eckart Roloff: Geistliche mit Geistesblitzen. (About Jacob Christian Schäffer und Claude Chappe.) In: Kultur und Technik. Das Magazin aus dem Deutschen Museum. Nr. 3/2012, p. 48–51, ISSN 0344-5690 (in German)
