= Paul Kummer =

German mycologist (1834–1912)

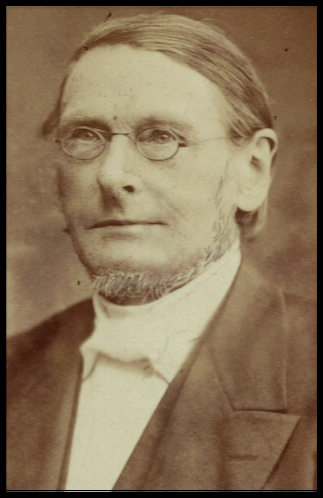
Mycologist Paul Kummer

Paul Kummer (22 August 1834 – 6 December 1912) was a minister, teacher, and scientist in Zerbst, Germany, known chiefly for his contribution to mycological nomenclature. Earlier classification of agarics by pioneering fungal taxonomist Elias Magnus Fries designated only a very small number of genera, with most species falling into Agaricus. These few genera were divided into many tribus ("tribes"; not tribes in the modern sense). In his 1871 work, Der Führer in die Pilzkunde, Kummer raised the majority of Fries "tribus" to the status of genus, thereby establishing many of the generic names for agarics that are in use to this day. In 1874 he issued the work Der Führer in die Flechtenkunde with numbered lichen specimens arranged in two plates like an exsiccata.

From 1857 to 1863, he worked as a private lecturer, then served as a curate in Zerbst (1863–1877). From 1877 onward, he was a minister in Hann Munden.

== Bibliography ==
- "Der Führer in die Pilzkunde. Anleitung zum methodischen, leichten und sichern Bestimmen der in Deutschland vorkommenden Pilze, mit Ausnahme der Schimmel- und allzu winzigen Schleim- und Kern-Pilzchen." 1. Auflage. Zerbst (E. Luppe); (1871).
- "Der Führer in die Mooskunde. Anleitung zum leichten und sicheren Bestimmen der deutschen Moose". 119 S.; Berlin. (1873).
- "Der Führer in die Lebermoose und die Fefäßkryptogamen" (Schachtelhalme, Bärlappe, Farne, Wurzelfrüchtler). 1. Aufl.; Berlin (Springer); (1875).
- "Kryptogamische Charakterbilder". VIII+251 S., 220 Abb.; Hannover, (1878).
- "Der Führer in die Mooskunde. Anleitung zum leichten und sicheren Bestimmen der deutschen Moose", 2. Aufl.; Berlin, (1880).
- "Die Moosflora der Umgebung von Hann.-Münden". - Bot. Centralblatt 40: 65–72, 101–106; Kassel, (1889).
- "Der Führer in die Mooskunde. Anleitung zum leichten und sicheren Bestimmen der deutschen Moose". 3. Auflage; Berlin, (1891).
- "Der Führer in die Lebermoose und die Gefäßkryptogamen" (Schachtelhalme, Bärlappe, Farne, Würzelfrüchtler). 2. Auflage VII+148 S.; Berlin (Springer), (1901).
