= Catathelasma ventricosum =

Scientific classification
- Kingdom: Fungi
- Division: Basidiomycota
- Class: Agaricomycetes
- Order: Agaricales
- Family: Biannulariaceae
- Genus: Catathelasma
- Species: C. ventricosum

Binomial name
- Catathelasma ventricosum (Peck) Singer

Synonyms
- Lentinus ventricosus Peck (1896)

Species of fungus

Catathelasma ventricosum
- Mycological characteristics
- Gills on hymenium
- Cap is convex or flat
- Hymenium is decurrent
- Stipe has a ring
- Spore print is white
- Ecology is mycorrhizal
- Edibility is edible

Catathelasma ventricosum, also known as Catathelasma ventricosa and commonly known as the large cat, mock matsutake, or swollen-stalked catathelasma, is a species of mushroom in the genus Catathelasma. It can often be confused with Tricholoma murrillanum, but it lacks the distinctive smell.

== Taxonomy ==
Catathelasma ventricosum was first described in 1896 by Charles Horton Peck as Lentinus ventricosus. In 1940, Rolf Singer transferred it to the genus Catathelasma.

== Description ==
The cap of Catathelasma ventricosum is grayish to brownish in color. When young, it often has whitish spots, and in age it often becomes whitish. It can have woolly patches or be smooth. It starts out round and becomes convex and eventually flat. It is about 8-25 centimeters in diameter. The stipe is typically about 10-30 centimeters long and about 2-7 centimeters wide. It often has a long taproot and a double-layered annulus. Aboveground, it is often swollen. The gills are whitish and slightly to fully decurrent. The spore print is white.

=== Similar species ===
Catathelasma ventricosum is very similar to both C. imperiale and C. evanescens. However, C. imperiale is not known from North America and C. evanescens has smaller spores. Tricholoma murrillanum is very similar but has notched gills and a distinctive funky cinnamon scent. Amanita smithiana is also somewhat similar, but it often has powdery veil remnants on the margin of its cap.

== Habitat and distribution ==
Catathelasma ventricosum is found in North America. It was originally described from Alabama, though the name C. ventricosum is also being used for a species in northern and western North America, which may be distinct. It can be found under conifers, and is likely mycorrhizal.
