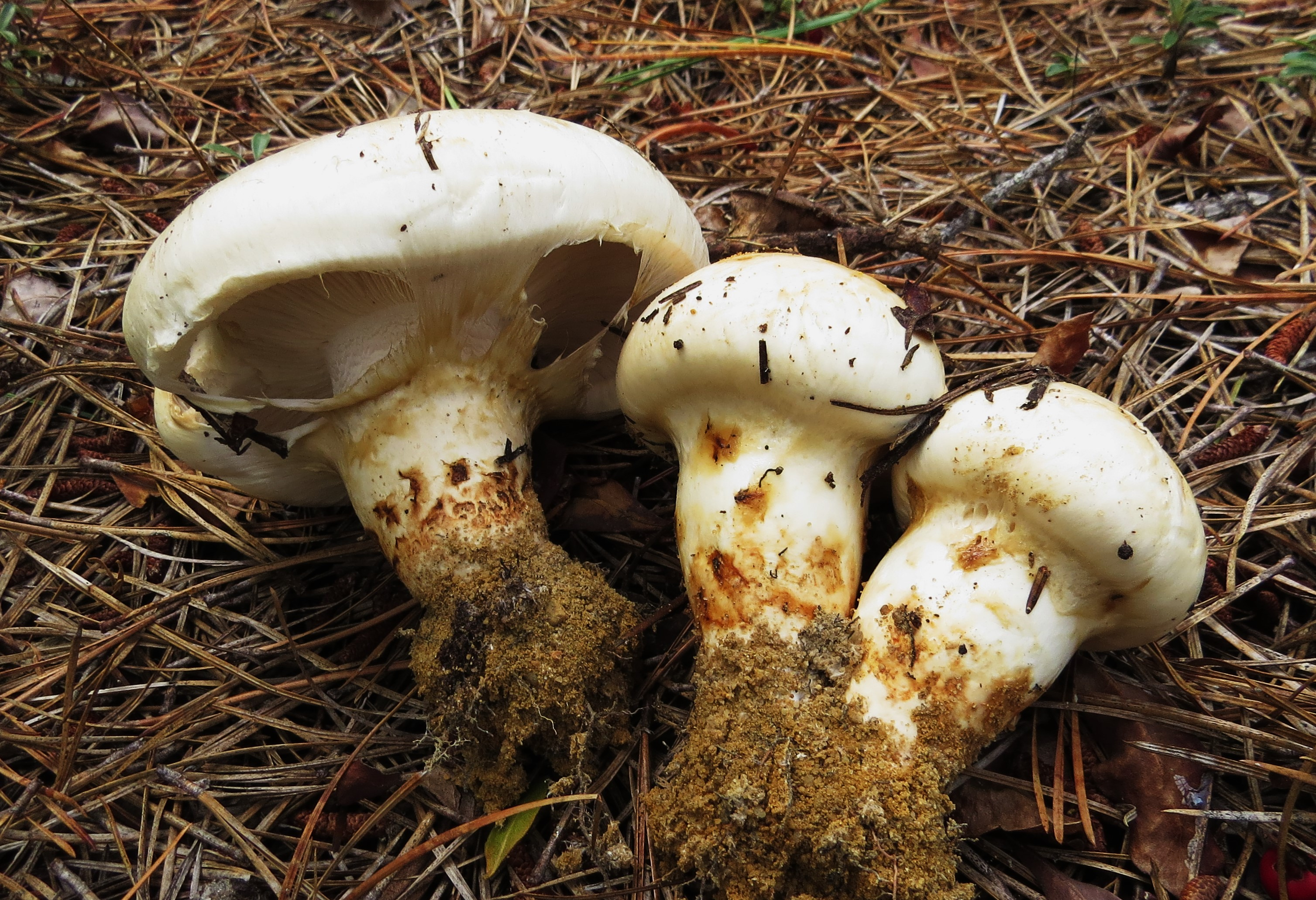

Scientific classification
- Kingdom: Fungi
- Division: Basidiomycota
- Class: Agaricomycetes
- Order: Agaricales
- Family: Tricholomataceae
- Genus: Tricholoma
- Species: T. magnivelare

Binomial name
- Tricholoma magnivelare (Peck) Redhead (1984)

Synonyms
- Agaricus ponderosus Peck (1873); Agaricus magnivelaris Peck (1878); Armillaria ponderosa Sacc. (1887); Armillaria arenicola Murrill (1912); Armillaria magnivelaris (Peck) Murrill (1914); Tricholoma ponderosum (Sacc.) Singer (1951)

= Tricholoma magnivelare =

Species of fungus

Tricholoma magnivelare
- Mycological characteristics
- Gills on hymenium
- Cap is convex
- Hymenium is adnate or adnexed
- Stipe has a ring
- Spore print is white
- Ecology is mycorrhizal
- Edibility is choice

Tricholoma magnivelare, commonly known as the matsutake, white matsutake, ponderosa mushroom, pine mushroom, or American matsutake, is a gilled mushroom found East of the Rocky Mountains in North America growing in coniferous woodland. These ectomycorrhizal fungi are typically edible species that exist in a symbiotic relationship with various species of pine, commonly jack pine. They belong to the genus Tricholoma, which includes the closely related East Asian songi or matsutake as well as the Western matsutake (T. murrillianum) and Meso-American matsutake (T. mesoamericanum).

== Taxonomy ==
Until recently, the name Tricholoma magnivelare described all matsutake mushrooms found in North America. Since the early 2000s, molecular data has indicated the presence of separate species in the prior group, with only those found in the Eastern United States and Canada retaining the name T. magnivelare.

== Description ==
The cap ranges from 5–20 centimetres (2–7 7/8 in) in width, and is white with reddish-yellow or brown spots. The stalk is 4–15 cm (1 5/8–5 7/8 in) tall and 2–6 cm wide. The spores are white.

== Chemical ecology ==
This mushroom is noted for its distinctive odour/flavour. The major compound identified from fresh sporocarps is the fragrant compound, methyl cinnamate. Also, alpha-pinene and bornyl acetate are present in trace amounts in uncrushed samples. Tissue disruption of the sporocarp produces large amounts of 1-octen-3-ol, a compound found in many mushrooms that has a typical mushroom-like odour. Both methyl cinnamate and 1-octen-3-ol have been shown to be potent banana slug (Ariolimax columbianus) antifeedants. Cultures of the secondary mycelium of T. magnivelare did not have any of the compounds found in the sporocarp. The major volatile component of mycelial cultures is 3,5-dichloro-4-methoxybenzaldehyde. 3,5-Dichloro-4-methoxybenzyl alcohol and hexanal were identified as minor components from these cultures. These chlorinated compounds inhibit fungal metabolism: fungal cell wall growth by chitin synthase and melanin biosynthesis. These compounds may keep other fungi from taking over the tree roots that T. magnivelare colonizes.

=== Similar species ===
Similar species in the genus include Tricholoma apium, T. caligatum, T. focale, and T. vernaticum. Other similar species include Catathelasma imperiale, C. ventricosum, Russula brevipes, and the poisonous Amanita smithiana.

== Uses ==
While tough, the mushroom can be eaten both raw and cooked and is considered choice. In recent years, globalization and wider social acceptability of mushroom hunting has made collection of pine mushrooms widely popular in North America. However, serious poisonings have resulted from confusion of this mushroom with poisonous white Amanita species.

Local mushroom hunters sell their harvest daily to local depots, which rush them to airports. The mushrooms are then shipped fresh by air to Asia where demand is high and prices are at a premium.

== See also ==
- List of North American Tricholoma
- List of Tricholoma species
