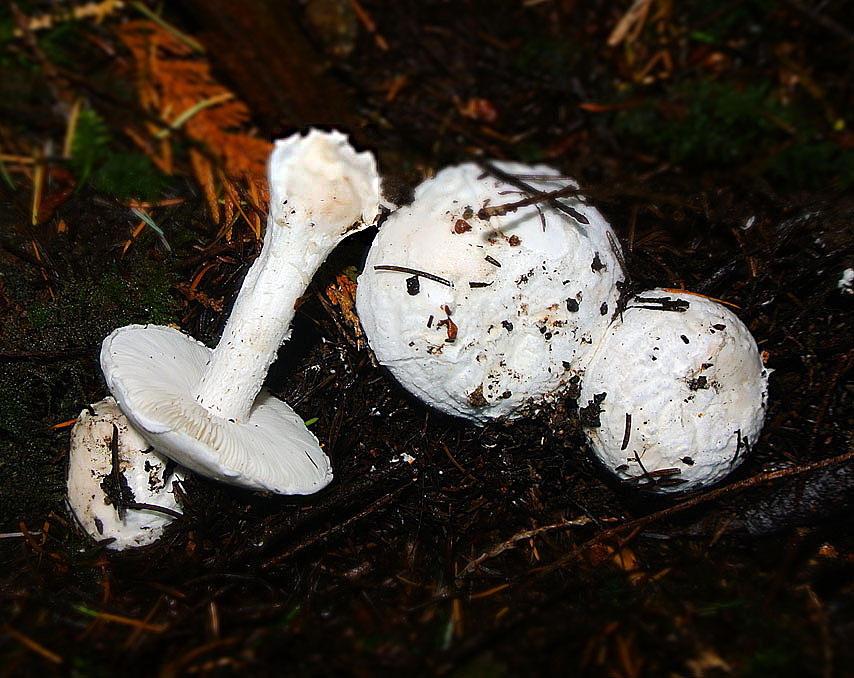

Conservation status
- Least Concern (IUCN 3.1)

Scientific classification
- Kingdom: Fungi
- Division: Basidiomycota
- Class: Agaricomycetes
- Order: Agaricales
- Family: Amanitaceae
- Genus: Amanita
- Species: A. silvicola

Binomial name
- Amanita silvicola Kauffman 1925

= Amanita silvicola =

Species of fungus

Amanita silvicola
- Mycological characteristics
- Gills on hymenium
- Cap is convex or flat
- Hymenium is free or adnate
- Stipe has a volva
- Spore print is white
- Ecology is mycorrhizal
- Edibility is unknown but not recommended

Amanita silvicola, also known as the woodland amanita or Kauffman's forest amanita, is a species of Amanita. It forms a small to medium-sized white mushroom. The cap is 5–12 cm across and is pure white, convex to flat, often with an incurved margin. The cap is initially covered in a wooly outer veil that later leaves soft patchy remnants across its surface as it flattens. The stem is patched with volva remains, and is slightly larger at its base. The gills are white, close and crowded, and free, just reaching the stem, or to narrowly adnate. The flesh does not change colour when bruised or cut, but its cap may discolour with age.

The species is found in coniferous woods the Pacific Northwest and California. Its edibility of is uncertain, but due to its close resemblance to two poisonous mushrooms in the genus, its consumption is strongly advised against.

== Taxonomy ==
The species was first described and named by Calvin Henry Kauffman in 1925, who had collected the type specimen in Mt. Hood, Oregon on September 30, 1922. The species epithet silvicola is derived from silva, Latin for "wood" or "forest", and -cola, Latin suffix for "dweller of" or "inhabiting", referring to its habitat.

== Description ==
The cap is 5 to 12 centimetres (2 to 4 3/4 in) wide, dry and pure white in color. The cap is initially rounded then flattens. In advanced age and with decay, the cap may discolour, developing, as observed by Kauffman, "bright rose-colored spots and streaks". Younger fruiting bodies (mushrooms) are covered by a fluffy continuous universal veil, which breaks up irregularly across its slightly sticky surface into soft powdery patches instead of firm warts. The flesh of the cap thins considerably at its margin, which remains incurved into maturity. The gills are white and crowded together and have a free to narrowly adnate attachment, though sometimes reach towards the stipe in a deccurent tooth. The gills are medium broad, 6–7mm, with cottony edges, and in maturity they project below the margin of the cap. The spores are 8.0–10.0 μm by 4.2–6.0 μm, smooth, amyloid, ellipsoid and colourless, leaving a white spore print.

The stem is 5 to 12 cm long and 12 to 25 mm thick; it is stout, tapering slightly as it reaches the cap. It sometimes has a slight ring on its cap. A. silvicola rarely roots, it has a basal marginate bulb (distinctly separate from the stem) at its base, about 3–4 cm thick with wooly veil remnants on its margin. The flesh is white and does not change color when cut.

It can be distinguished from most other white Amanita species by its short stalk.

Its edibility of uncertain, but due to its close resemblance to a poisonous mushroom in the genus with similar distribution range, A. smithiana, its consumption is strongly advised against.

== Habitat and distribution ==
Amanita silvicola is found in the Pacific Northwest of North America, California, and more rarely in the Sierra Nevada mountains. The IUCN Red List has assessed it as Least Concern, as the population is stable and "locally common" in the Pacific northwest and California.

A. silvicola is a terrestrial species; it can be found as a solitary mushroom or in small groups in coniferous woods, especially under Western hemlock. It has a preference for areas of high rainfall.

== See also ==
- Category:Taxa named by Calvin Henry Kauffman
- List of Amanita species
