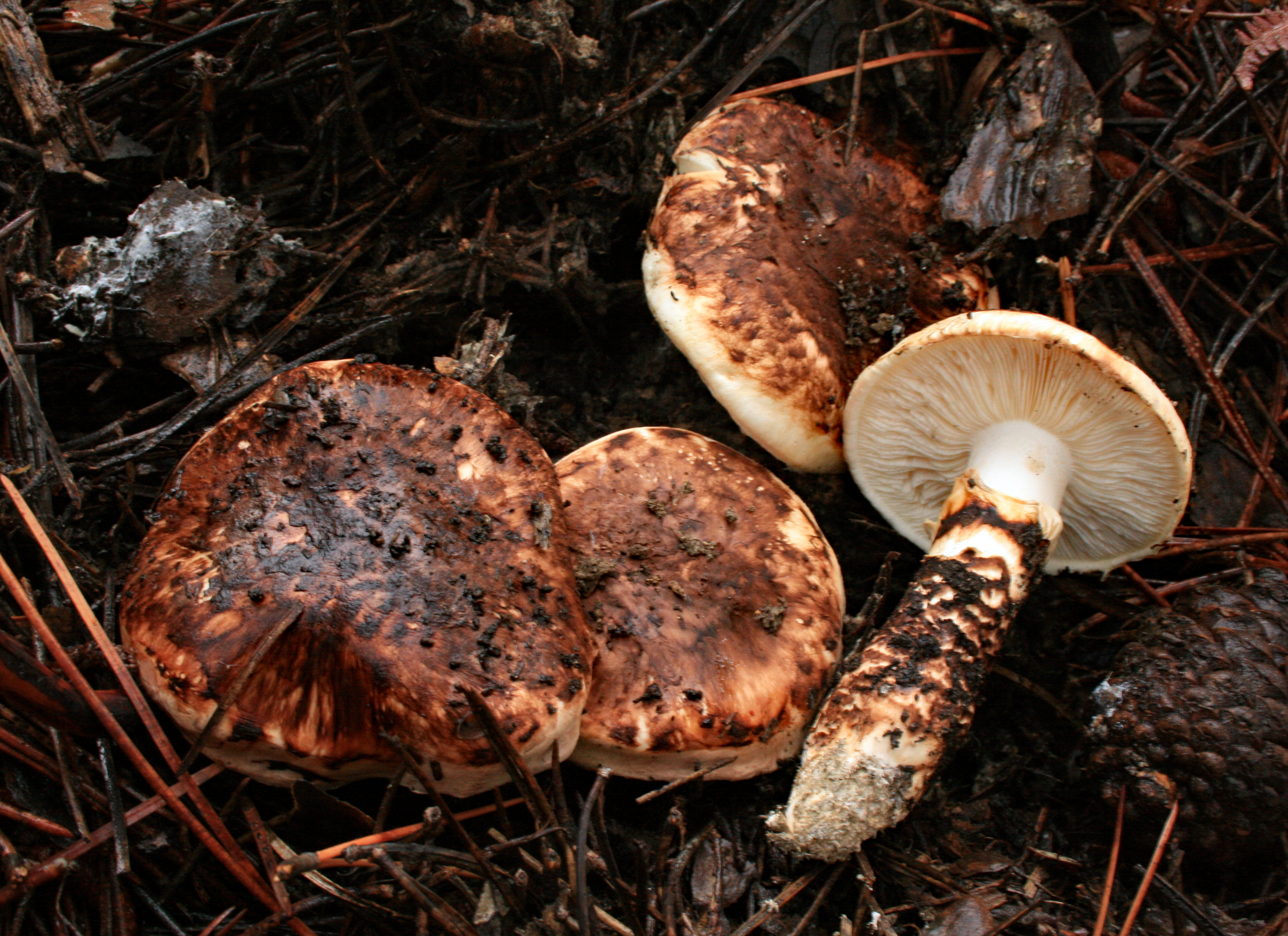

Scientific classification
- Kingdom: Fungi
- Division: Basidiomycota
- Class: Agaricomycetes
- Order: Agaricales
- Family: Tricholomataceae
- Genus: Tricholoma
- Species: T. caligatum

Binomial name
- Tricholoma caligatum (Viv.) Ricken (1915)

Synonyms
- Agaricus caligatus Viv. (1834); Armillaria caligata (Viv.) Gillet (1874); Sphaerocephalus caligatus (Viv.) Raithelhuber (1979); Sphaerocephalus caligatum (Viv.) Raithelhuber (1979)

= Tricholoma caligatum =

Species of fungus

Tricholoma caligatum is a mushroom of the agaric genus Tricholoma. It is a large species with a distinct sheathing ring on the stem, found in mycorrhizal association with various trees throughout the Mediterranean. It is edible and sometimes referred to as the European Matsutake due to allegedly tasting like the true matsutake (T. matsutake), prized in Japan, but it is often bitter.

== Taxonomy ==
Tricholoma caligatum was originally described in 1834 as "Agaricus caligatus" and was transferred to genus Tricholoma in 1914. Considerable controversy exists regarding the application of this name to Central European and North American collections, which likely represent different species.

The name caligatum (Latin: 'boot-wearing') refers to the appearance of the mushroom, which looks like it is wearing a boot due to the presence of dark fibrils on the lower portion of the stem.

== Description ==
Tricholoma caligatum
- Mycological characteristics
- Gills on hymenium
- Cap is convex
- Hymenium is adnate
- Stipe has a ring
- Spore print is white
- Ecology is mycorrhizal
- Edibility is edible or choice

The cap (pileus) is hemispherical at first, soon becoming convex to flat, reaching 12–15 centimetres (4 3/4–6 in) in diameter, and it is covered in large, chestnut to dark-brown fibrous scales or patches. The inrolled cap edge tends to host cottony bits of partial veil. The gills (lamellae) are adnate to sinuate, crowded, whitish to cream (and reddish-brown-spotted in age).

The stem (stipe) is 4–12 cm long, tapering and somewhat rooting at the base, and has a well-developed cottony ring covering the gills when young. Below the ring the stem is covered in dark bands of scales, which are the same colour as the cap. The flesh is thick and fibrous, and has a distinct, spicy, penetrating smell resembling nutmeg or allspice. The spore print is white.

=== Similar species ===
Tricholoma dulciolens may be the correct name for some specimens in western North America. Tricholoma magnivelare is similar to T. caligatum, outnumbering it in the Pacific Northwest, and also appearing elsewhere in North America, Europe, and Asia. T. murrilianum lacks the brownish scales, and the rare Squamanita umbonata has a small, pointed cap.

== Ecology and distribution ==
Tricholoma caligatum is a strictly Southern species, locally common in Mediterranean woods. It is associated with several conifers, such as Pinus pinea, P. brutia, P. halepensis, P. nigra, and P. pinaster, but also with evergreen oaks, strawberry trees and terebinth bushes. It appears in coastal and high altitude woods in autumn and winter. According to Christensen & Heilmann-Clausen, North American reports of this fungus likely represent a different species.

== Edibility ==
Tricholoma caligatum is considered edible, although fruitbodies are often bitter, particularly when found under hardwood trees. Forms lacking the bitterness are said to be as good as matsutake. The bitterness seems to vary from one collection to another and is removed by parboiling. It is regularly consumed along the Mediterranean coast and is highly valued in the island of Cyprus, where is considered a delicacy pickled and preserved in brine or vinegar. Conflicting reports regarding the species' edibility may be due to the poor taste and odor of some specimens, or confusion with other species.

== See also ==
- List of North American Tricholoma
- List of Tricholoma species
