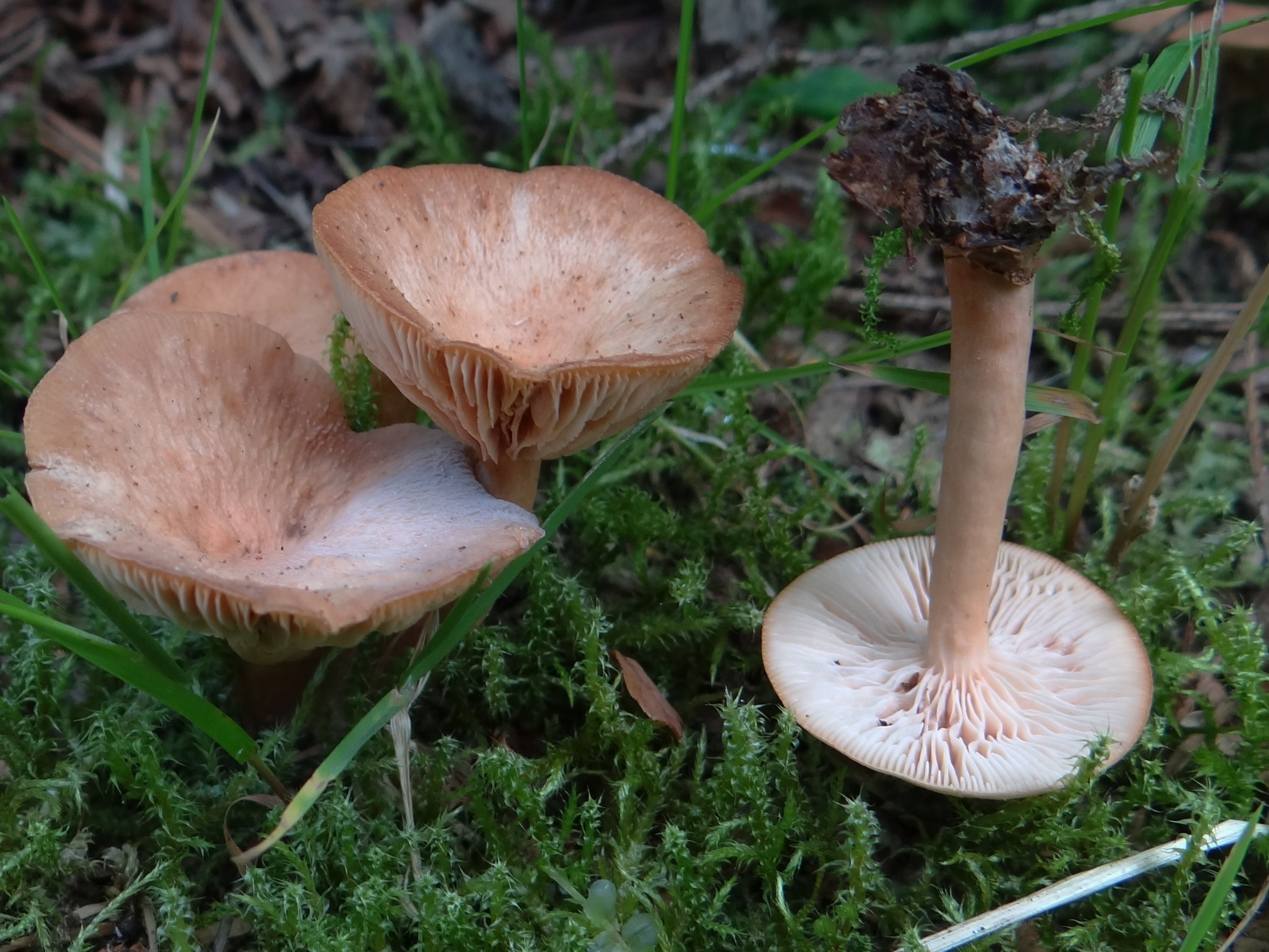
- Bonomyces sinopicus, Poland

Scientific classification
- Kingdom: Fungi
- Division: Basidiomycota
- Class: Agaricomycetes
- Order: Agaricales
- Family: Biannulariaceae
- Genus: Bonomyces
- Species: B. sinopicus

Binomial name
- Bonomyces sinopicus (Fr.) Vizzini (2014)

Synonyms
- Agaricus sinopicus Fr. (1818); Clitocybe sinopica (Fr.) P. Kumm. (1871); Omphalia sinopica (Fr.) Quél. (1886); Clitocybe subsinopica Harmaja (1978)

= Bonomyces sinopicus =

Species of fungus

Bonomyces sinopicus is an agaricoid species of fungus in the family Biannulariaceae with a European distribution. It has been given the recommended English name of spring funnel. The species was formerly placed in the genus Clitocybe, but has been separated on DNA characteristics.
