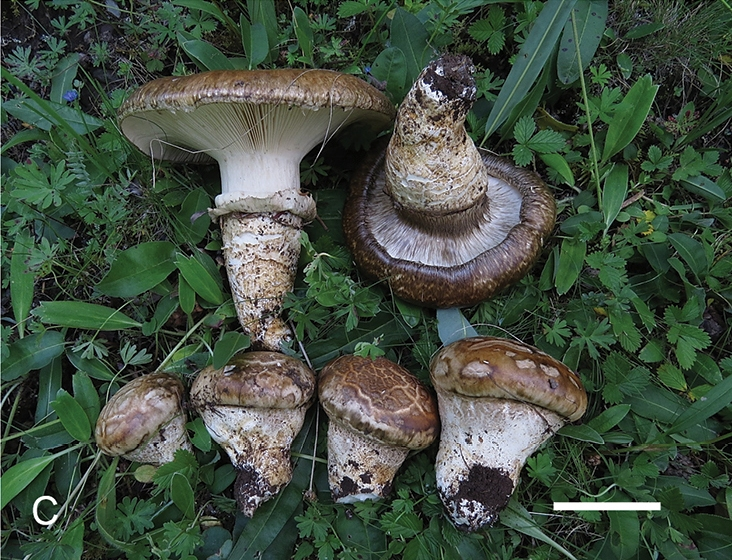
- Catathelasma imperiale, China

Conservation status
- Near Threatened (IUCN 3.1)

Scientific classification
- Kingdom: Fungi
- Division: Basidiomycota
- Class: Agaricomycetes
- Order: Agaricales
- Family: Biannulariaceae
- Genus: Catathelasma
- Species: C. imperiale

Binomial name
- Catathelasma imperiale (P. Karst.) Singer (1940)

Synonyms
- 1845 Agaricus imperialis N. Lund (nom. illegit.); 1879 Armillaria imperialis P. Karst. 1886 Omphalia imperialis (P. Karst.) Quél. 1891 Mastoleucomyces imperialis (P. Karst.) Kuntze; 1914 Armillaria nobilis Murrill; 1914 Clitocybe imperialis (P. Karst.) Ricken; 1922 Biannularia imperialis (P. Karst.) Beck; 1927 Armillariella imperialis (P. Karst.) Konrad & Maubl.

= Catathelasma imperiale =

Species of fungus

Catathelasma imperiale
- Mycological characteristics
- Gills on hymenium
- Cap is convex
- Hymenium is decurrent
- Stipe has a ring
- Spore print is white
- Ecology is mycorrhizal
- Edibility is edible

Catathelasma imperiale, also known as Catathelasma imperialis, and commonly known as the imperial mushroom, Hutsul mushroom, or korban, is a species of agaric (gilled mushroom) in the family Biannulariaceae. Basidiocarps (fruit bodies) are stocky, with a double annulus (ring), and a tapering to rooting stipe (stem).

The species is ectomycorrhizal with conifers and is found in continental Europe and Asia. Reports from North America are unconfirmed and may refer to Catathelasma evanescens or similar species. The fruit bodies are edible and collected for food in China and elsewhere. The species is widespread but uncommon and is assessed as globally "near threatened" on the IUCN Red List of Threatened Species.

== Taxonomy ==
Catathelasma imperiale was first described from Sweden in 1845 by Norwegian botanist Nicolai Lund as Agaricus imperialis, but this name is illegitimate since two earlier (and different) fungi had already been described under the same name. The species was first legitimately described, as Armillaria imperialis, by Finnish mycologist Petter Adolf Karsten in 1879. In 1922 the Austrian botanist Günther Beck von Mannagetta und Lerchenau created the new genus Biannularia for this species, making it Biannularia imperialis. In 1940, Singer transferred it to the existing genus Catathelasma, considering the two genera to be synonymous. Recent DNA research confirms this synonymy.

The epithet "imperiale", meaning "imperial" refers to the (at times) imposing size of the fruit bodies.

== Description ==
The fruit bodies are agaricoid with a pileus (cap) that is convex and sticky at first becoming flat or slightly depressed and dry, 8–40 centimetres (3.1–15.7 in) in diameter, orange brown to hazel brown, with darker patches. The lamellae (gills) are whitish to cream, decurrent, crowded, and sometimes forked. The stipe (stem) is compact, 5–18 cm (2.0–7.1 in) long, tapering to the base, often rooting and partly buried, pale brown with a double ring. The fruit body has a mealy or cucumber-like smell. The spore print is white. Microscopically, the spores are subcylindrical, often fusoid, 12.5–16.0 × 5.0–6.5 μm, smooth, and amyloid. The hyphae have clamp connections.

== Habitat and distribution ==
Catathelasma imperiale is an ectomycorrhizal species, forming an association with conifers, particularly spruce.

Originally described from Scandinavia, it has been recorded from most northern countries in continental Europe as far south as Italy. It has also been recorded in Asia from China, Korea, and Japan. Records from North America are uncertain, since DNA sequencing of specimens determined as "C. imperiale" have (to date) proven to belong to C. evanescens or C. ventricosum.

== Conservation ==
The species is legally protected in Poland and is included in the Red Lists of 15 European countries. It is considered declining everywhere due to forest eutrophication, habitat destruction, and habitat change. Catathelasma imperiale has consequently been assessed as "near threatened" on the IUCN Red List of Threatened Species.

== Edibility ==
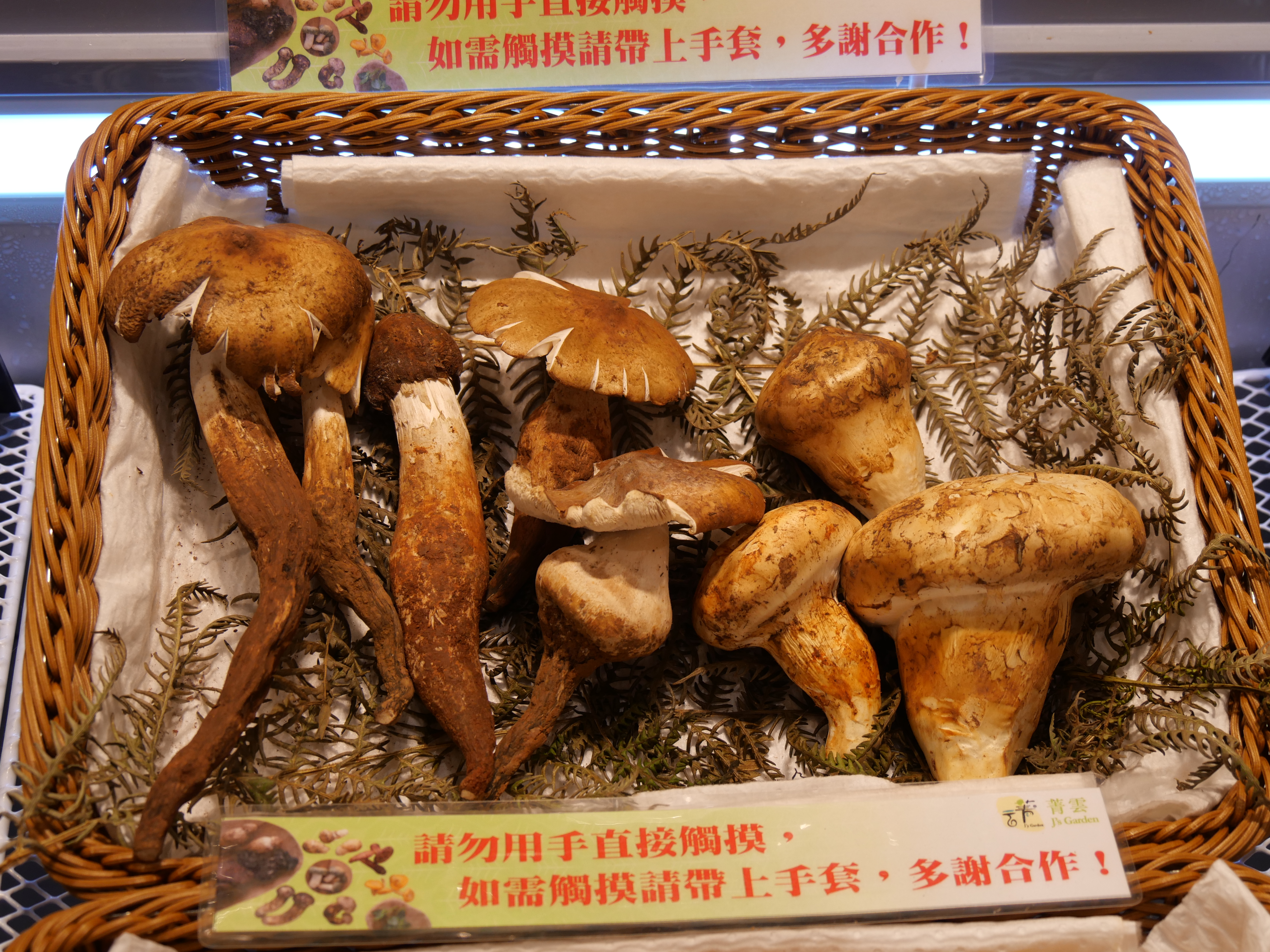
For sale in Hong Kong

Although it can be discouragingly tough, the species is edible and collected for food in China, Bhutan, Ukraine, and Russia. In Ukraine, it is known as korban, or the Hutsul mushroom, because it is common among the Hutsuls who are said to be experts at finding it. In the Carpathian Mountains, it grows in coniferous and spruce forests at an altitude of 400–1,000 metres (1,300–3,300 ft) In the Hutsul culinary tradition, it is often dried, powdered, and used as a spice in gravies, kulish, stews, and bakes. It is also used as a meat substitute in patties during Lent.
