= Catathelasma evanescens =

Scientific classification
- Kingdom: Fungi
- Division: Basidiomycota
- Class: Agaricomycetes
- Order: Agaricales
- Family: Biannulariaceae
- Genus: Catathelasma
- Species: C. evanescens

Binomial name
- Catathelasma evanescens Lovejoy (1910)

Species of fungus

Catathelasma evanescens Mycological characteristics
- Gills on hymenium
- Cap is convex
- Hymenium is decurrent
- Stipe has a ring and volva
- Spore print is white
- Ecology is mycorrhizal
- Edibility is unknown

Catathelasma evanescens is a species of fungus in the family Biannulariaceae, and the type species of the genus Catathelasma. The species was described by Ruth Ellen Harrison Lovejoy in 1910.

== Description and Distribution ==
The genus includes the commoner C. imperiale and C. ventricosum, but the type species, C. evanescens, seems extremely rare. In 1914 it was only known from the location of the initial find, which is at an altitude of 3500 m. in the Medicine Bow Mountains of Wyoming. It is distinguished from the other species because the gills are fairly distant ("subdistant") and because it has a large persistent volva around the base of the stipe.

The species name may refer to the evanescent ring.

The following summary is taken from Mrs. Lovejoy's original description.

- Cap: 13 cm, broadly convex, white (but cream in the center).
- Gills: White, very decurrent, "subdistant", with short and long ones mixed.
- Stem: White, thick (4 cm.) but very short (1 cm.), with bulbous base, delicate evanescent ring, and large white persistent volva.
- Spores: smooth, white, elliptical to fusiform, 14 - 17.5 × 3 - 5 μm.
