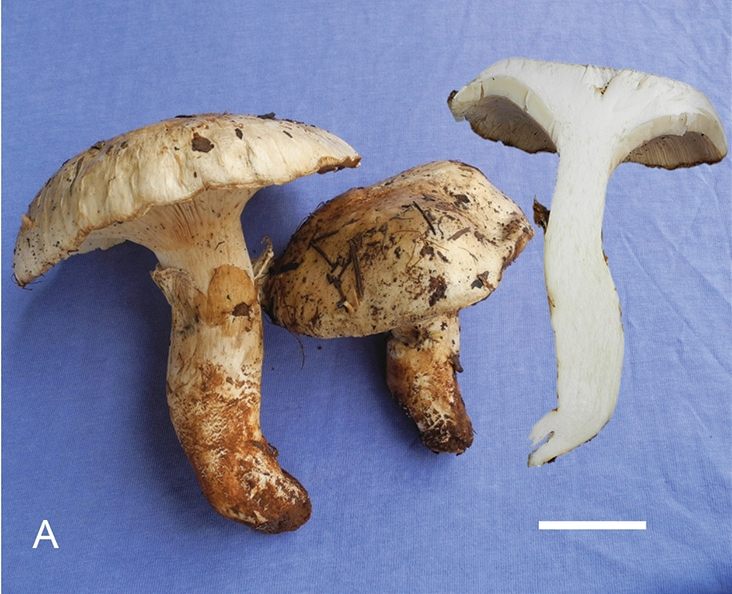
- Catathelasma laorentou, China

Scientific classification
- Kingdom: Fungi
- Division: Basidiomycota
- Class: Agaricomycetes
- Order: Agaricales
- Family: Biannulariaceae
- Genus: Catathelasma; Lovejoy (1910)

Type species
- Catathelasma evanescens Lovejoy (1910)

Species
- C. imperiale C. laorentou C. singeri C. subalpinum C. ventricosum

Synonyms
- Biannularia Beck (1922)

= Catathelasma =

Genus of fungi

Catathelasma is a genus of fungi in the family Biannulariaceae. Basidiocarps (fruit bodies) are agaricoid, with a conspicuous veil (leaving a double ring on the stem), adnate to decurrent lamellae, and amyloid basidiospores. The genus is separated on DNA characteristics as well as morphology. Species are known from North America, Europe, and Asia and are ectomycorrhizal, forming an association with the living roots of trees.

== Taxonomy ==
The genus Catathelasma was originally described in 1910 by American botanist and mycologist Ruth Ellen Harrison Lovejoy with C. evanescens as the type species.

in 1922 the Austrian botanist Günther Beck von Mannagetta und Lerchenau referred the European species Armillaria imperialis to his new genus Biannularia. For a time Catathelasma and Biannularia were regarded as separate (though closely related) genera, as for instance in a 1936 paper by Rolf Singer. Later Singer united the genera using Lovejoy's earlier name. Recent DNA research confirms this synonymy.

== Etymology ==
Lovejoy's original description states that:

"The ring and volva, together with the very decided decurrent gills (upon which character the generic name is based), are telling characteristics of this genus."

According to Genaust's etymological dictionary of botanical names, "Catathelasma" comes from Ancient Greek words "kata" (κατά - downwards) and "thelasma" (θήλασμα - meaning "the act of suckling"). He says that the reason for this construction is unclear, but suggests that the author is comparing the shape made by the gills running down the stem with a teat stretched out during suckling. "Decurrent" means "running down the stem" and another possible connection with Lovejoy's description is that "katatheo" (καταθέω) means "I run down". However it is difficult to see how that could logically give rise to the noun "Catathelasma".

== Description ==
Catathelasma species are stocky, Tricholoma-like fungi, with adnate to decurrent lamellae (gills), a double veil (giving the stipe two rings), a stipe that is tapered to the base and rooting (often buried), and a mealy smell. At the microscopic level they have oblong to cylindrical, amyloid spores, a bilateral gill trama, and hyphae with clamp connections.

== Habitat and distribution ==
Species are ectomycorrhizal, growing on the ground under conifers. They are known from continental Europe, North and Central America, and Asia.

== Edibility ==
Some species of Catathelasma are edible and are collected for food in China, Guatemala, and Russia.
