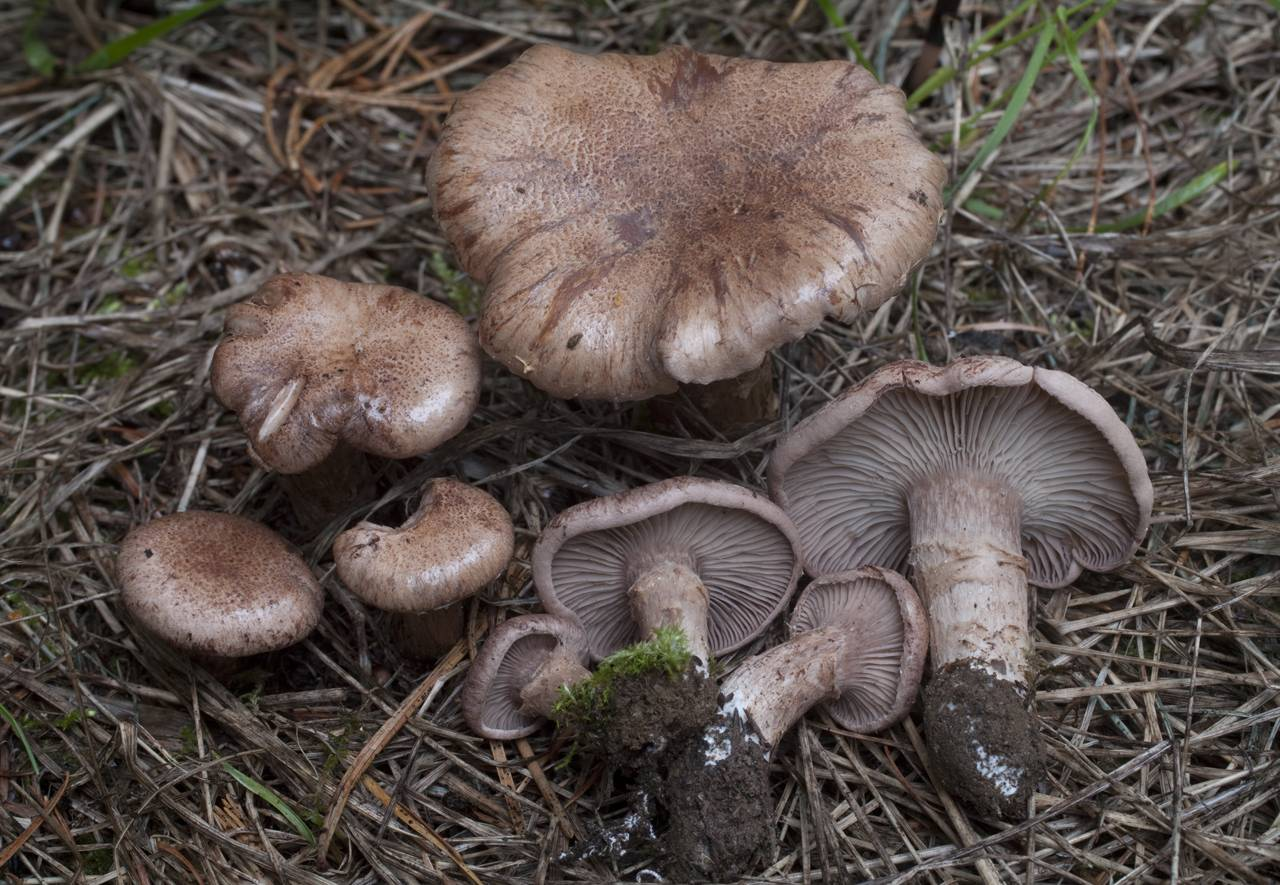
- Cleistocybe vernalis, Washington, USA

Scientific classification
- Kingdom: Fungi
- Division: Basidiomycota
- Class: Agaricomycetes
- Order: Agaricales
- Family: Biannulariaceae
- Genus: Cleistocybe; Ammirati, A.D.Parker & Matheny (2007)

Type species
- Cleistocybe vernalis Ammirati, A.D.Parker & Matheny (2007)

Species
- C. carneogrisea C. gomphidioides C. malenconii {nom. inval.} C. pleurotoides C. vernaloides

= Cleistocybe =

Genus of fungi

Cleistocybe is a genus of fungi in the family Biannulariaceae. Basidiocarps (fruit bodies) are agaricoid, similar to those of Clitocybe, but with ephemeral traces of a partial veil and decurrent lamellae that are often greyish. The genus is separated on DNA characteristics as well as morphology. Species are known from North America, Europe, North Africa, and Tibet.
