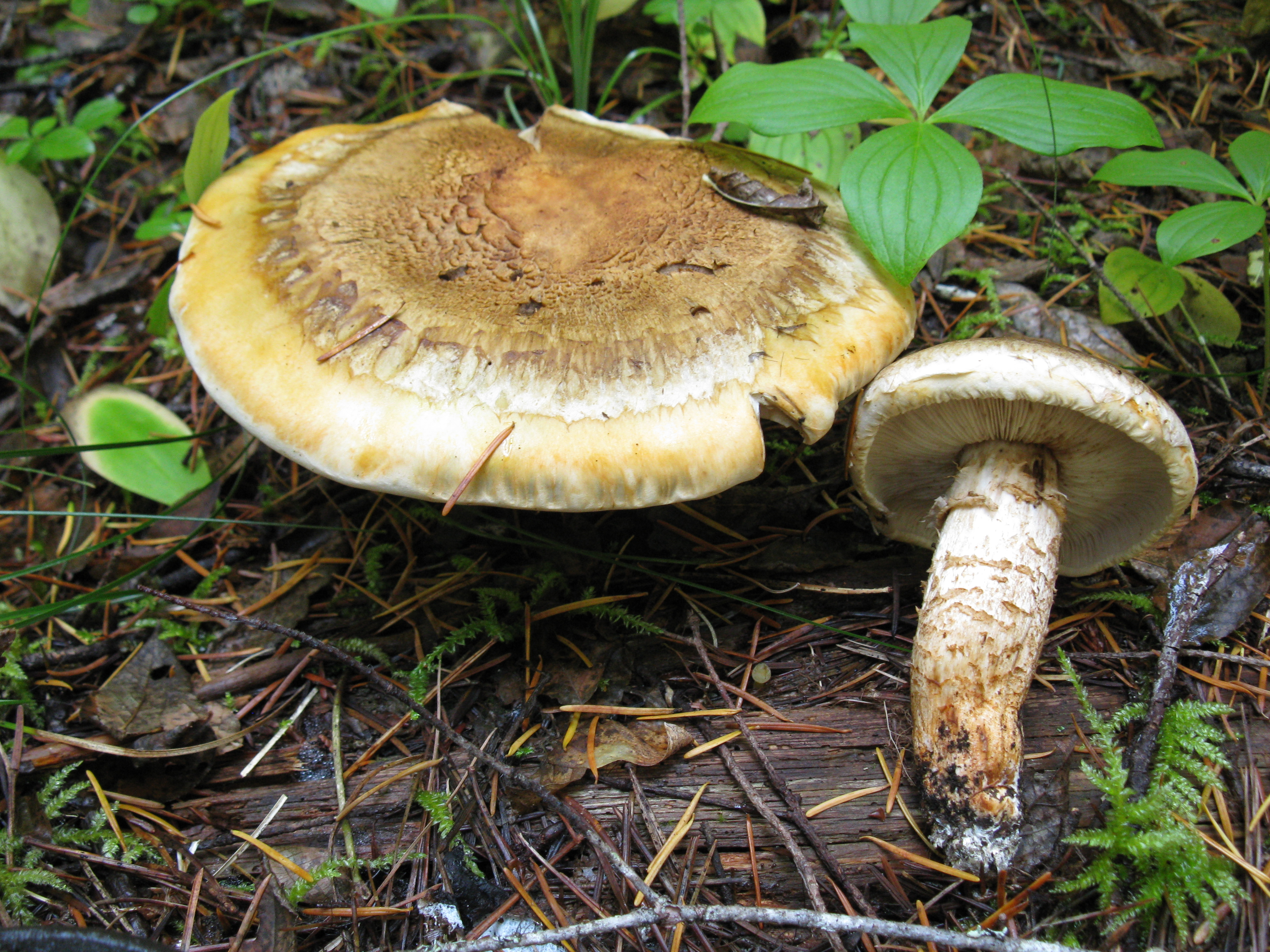

Scientific classification
- Kingdom: Fungi
- Division: Basidiomycota
- Class: Agaricomycetes
- Order: Agaricales
- Family: Tricholomataceae
- Genus: Tricholoma
- Species: T. dulciolens

Binomial name
- Tricholoma dulciolens Kytöv.

= Tricholoma dulciolens =

Species of fungus

Tricholoma dulciolens
- Mycological characteristics
- Gills on hymenium
- Cap is convex or flat
- Hymenium is adnexed or sinuate
- Stipe has a ring
- Spore print is white
- Ecology is mycorrhizal
- Edibility is not recommended or edible, but unpalatable

Tricholoma dulciolens, commonly known as the bitter matsutake, is a species of mushroom in the family Tricholomataceae. It is similar to T. murrillianum, the western matsutake, but it often tastes bitter.

== Taxonomy ==
Tricholoma dulciolens was first described from Sweden in 1989. It closely resembles T. caligatum. More recently, genetic sequencing has revealed that the version of T. caligatum in the Pacific Northwest is actually T. dulciolens.

== Description ==
The cap of Tricholoma dulciolens is whitish to buff and covered in brown scales and fibrils. It is about 4-9 centimeters in diameter. When young, it has an inrolled margin and is convex, and as it gets older it becomes broadly convex or flat to slightly umbonate. The cap can sometimes have cottony veil remnants. The stipe is whitish as well, and has similar scales as the cap. It has an annulus. The gills are white, though they can stain orangish brown in age. They are adnexed and slightly notched. The spore print is white. The scent is similar to that of matsutake mushrooms.

=== Similar species ===
The edible and sought-after Tricholoma murrillanium can be similar to T. dulciolens. However, it is white in color and lacks the brown scales. It is also stockier. T. caligatum is very similar to T. dulciolens. It is morphologically similar to T. dulciolens, but genetic sequencing has revealed that the version of T. caligatum found in the Pacific Northwest is actually T. dulciolens.

== Habitat and distribution ==
Tricholoma dulciolens is found in coniferous forests. In Sweden, it can be found under Norway spruce, while in the Pacific Northwest it can be found under fir, Douglas fir, and western hemlock.

== Edibility ==
Tricholoma dulciolens apparently has mixed reports about its edibility, and has a bitter taste. In the northeastern United States and the Rocky Mountains, it reportedly has a pleasant flavor, while in the Pacific Northwest, it is reported to taste bitter.
