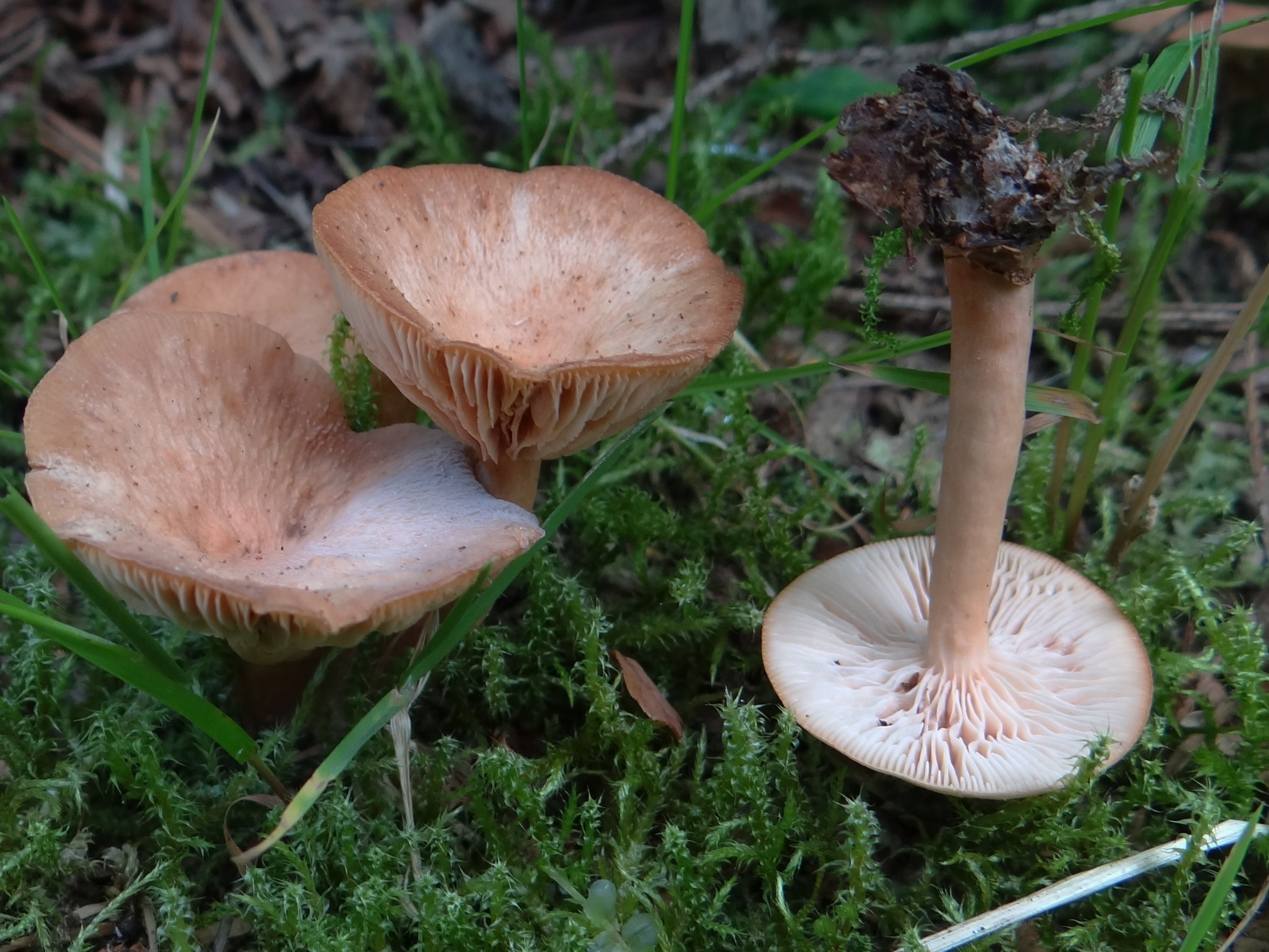
- Bonomyces sinopicus, Poland

Scientific classification
- Kingdom: Fungi
- Division: Basidiomycota
- Class: Agaricomycetes
- Order: Agaricales
- Family: Biannulariaceae
- Genus: Bonomyces; Vizzini (2014)

Type species
- Bonomyces sinopicus (Fr.) Vizzini (2014)

Species
- Bonomyces afrosinopicus Bonomyces arnoldii Bonomyces pseudoarnoldii Bonomyces squamulosus

= Bonomyces =

Genus of fungi

Bonomyces is a genus of fungi in the family Biannulariaceae. Basidiocarps (fruit bodies) are agaricoid, similar to those of Clitocybe, but with a distinctly hard stipe (stem). The genus is separated on DNA characteristics as well as morphology. Species are known from Europe, North Africa, and northern China.
