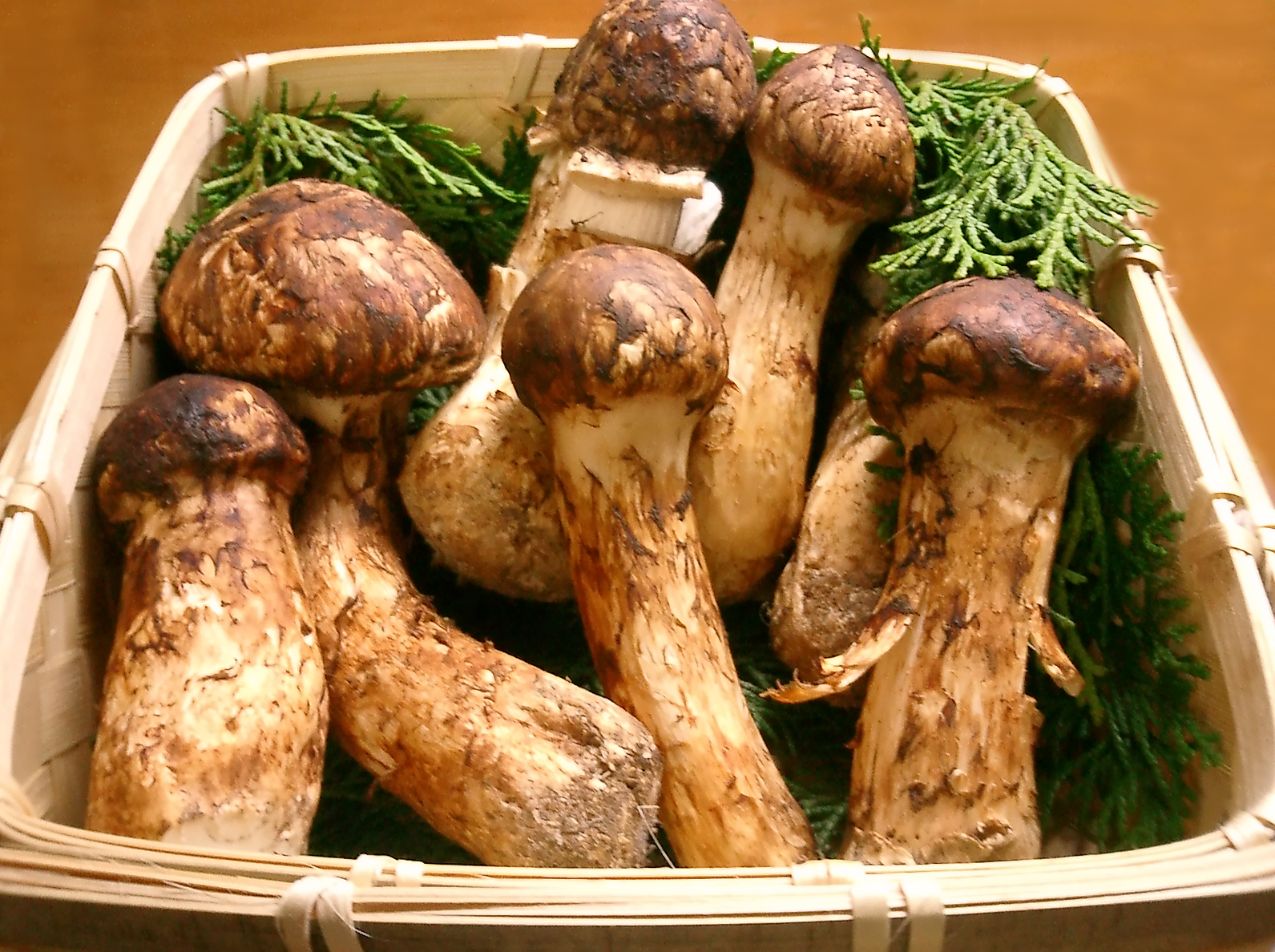
- Matsutake
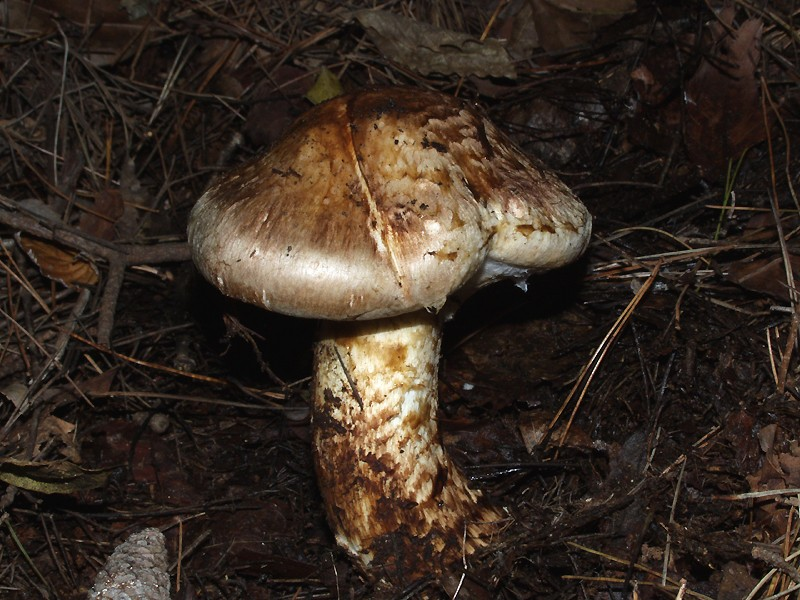

Conservation status
- Vulnerable (IUCN 3.1)

Scientific classification
- Kingdom: Fungi
- Division: Basidiomycota
- Class: Agaricomycetes
- Order: Agaricales
- Family: Tricholomataceae
- Genus: Tricholoma
- Species: T. matsutake

Binomial name
- Tricholoma matsutake (S.Ito & Imai) Singer (1943)

Synonyms
- Armillaria ponderosa Sacc. (1887); Armillaria matsutake var. matsutake S.Ito & Imai (1925); Armillaria matsutake var. formosana S.Ito & Imai (1931); Tricholoma nauseosum (A.Blytt) Kytov. (1989)

= Matsutake =

Species of edible mushrooms

Tricholoma matsutake
- Mycological characteristics
- Gills on hymenium
- Cap is convex
- Hymenium is adnexed
- Stipe has a ring
- Spore print is white
- Ecology is mycorrhizal
- Edibility is choice

Matsutake

Japanese name
- Kanji: 松茸
- Hiragana: まつたけ
- Katakana: マツタケ
Transcriptions
- Romanization: matsutake

Matsutake (Japanese: 松茸/マツタケ), Tricholoma matsutake, is a species of mushroom, with a cap that can reach up to 40 centimetres (16 in) wide. It resembles at least one poisonous species.

Growing in Eurasia and North America, it is a mycorrhizal species. It is a choice edible mushroom prized in Japanese cuisine.

== Etymology ==
The common name and specific epithet, matsutake, in use since the late 19th century, derives from Japanese matsu (pine tree) and take (mushroom).

== Description ==
The cap, stem, and gills are initially white then discolor brownish. Similarly dark fibrils appear on the cap and stalk. The cap can reach up to 40 centimetres (16 in) across while the stem is up to 25 cm (9 3/4 in) long and 5 cm thick. A ring is usually present. The flesh is white and firm, with a cinnamon-like aroma. The spore print is white.

=== Similar species ===
In Japan, several closely related species have been found, including Tricholoma bakamatsutake (baka-matsutake – 'fool's matsutake' in Japanese), T. fulvocastaneum (nise-matsutake – 'fake matsutake'), and T. robustum (matsutake-modoki – 'imitation of matsutake'). Of those species, only baka-matsutake has a taste similar to that of matsutake. Both baka-matsutake and nise-matsutake grow in Fagaceae forests, while matsutake-modoki grows in the same pine forests as the genuine matsutake.

In the North American Pacific Northwest, T. murrillianum is found in coniferous forests of one or more of the following tree species: western hemlock, Douglas-fir, Noble fir, Shasta red fir, Sugar pine, Ponderosa pine, or Lodgepole pine. In California and parts of Oregon, it is also associated with hardwoods, including Tanoak, Madrone, Rhododendron, Salal, and Manzanita. In northeastern North America, the closely related mushroom Tricholoma magnivelare is generally found in Jack pine forests. A 2000 report categorized T. nauseosum as a synonym of T. matsutake. Inocybe pyriodora is a small poisonous lookalike with brown spores.

== Distribution and habitat ==
Matsutake mushrooms grow in East Asia, South Asia (Bhutan), and Southeast Asia (Laos), parts of Europe such as Estonia, Finland, Norway, Poland, Sweden, and in northern North America, especially the Pacific Northwest around November.

Matsutake mushrooms grow under trees and are usually concealed under litter on the forest floor, forming a symbiotic relationship with roots of various tree species, typically in fir and pine forests. In Korea and Japan, matsutake mushrooms are most commonly associated with Pinus densiflora. In China, matsutake (Chinese: 松茸; pinyin: sōngróng) is mainly distributed in the northeast and southwest regions. In the northeast, the growth of matsutake depends on the P. densiflora, its distribution is the same as that of P. densiflora. Longjing City, Jilin Province, China is known as the "Hometown of Matsutake". "天佛指山/Tianfozhi Mountain" in Longjing has been approved as a national nature reserve by the State Council of China. This is the first nature reserve for an edible mushroom and its ecosystem in China.

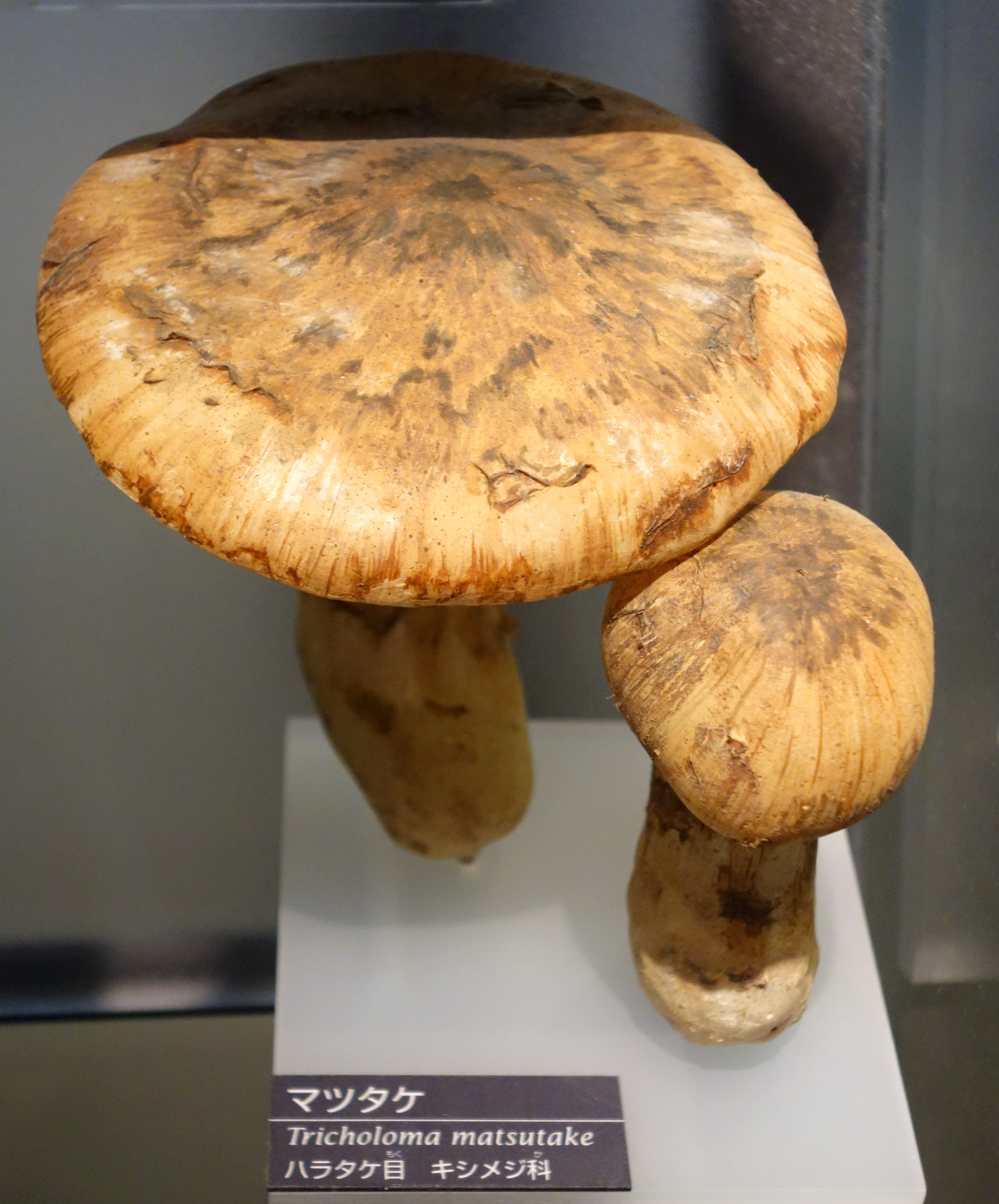

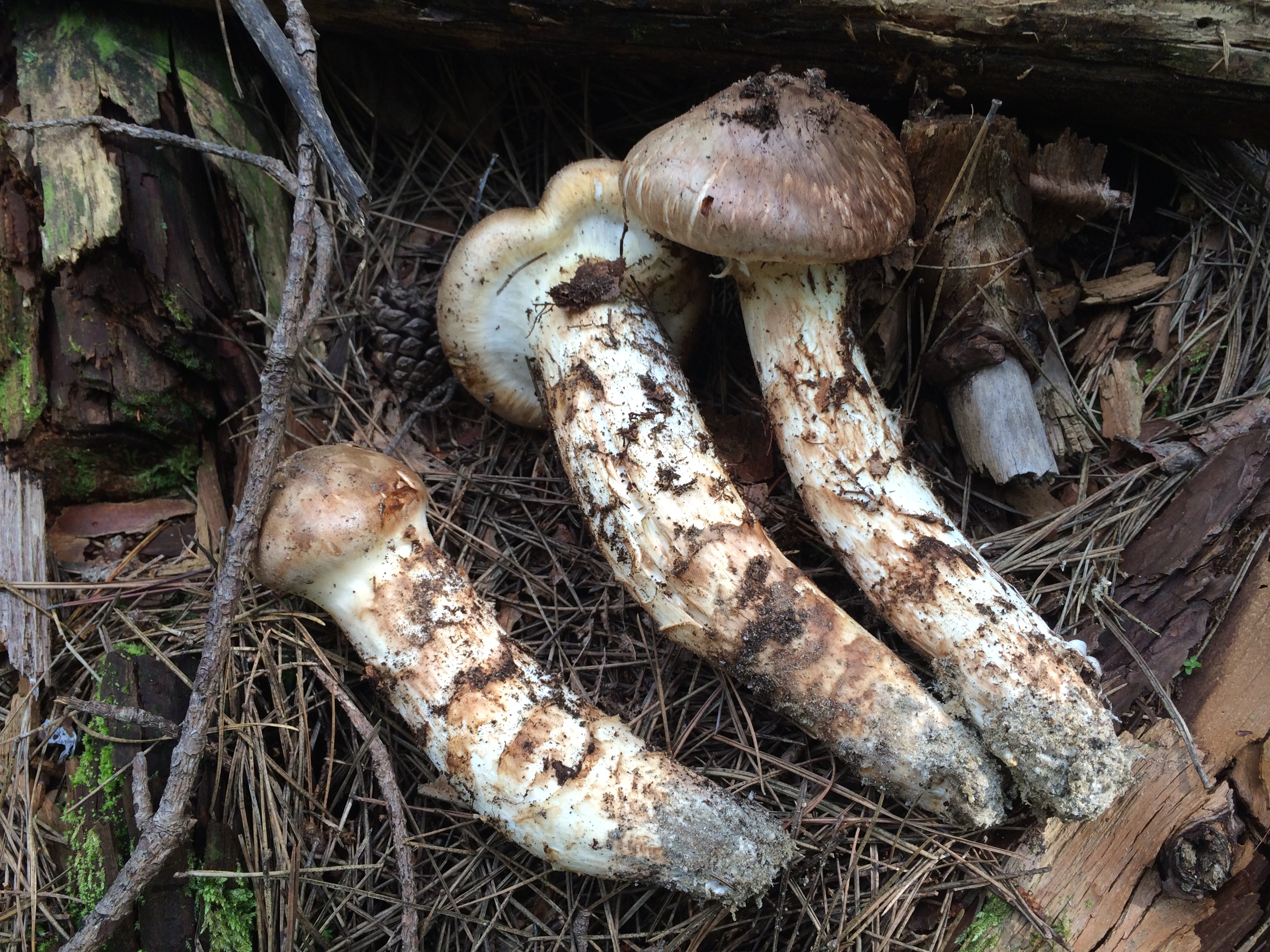

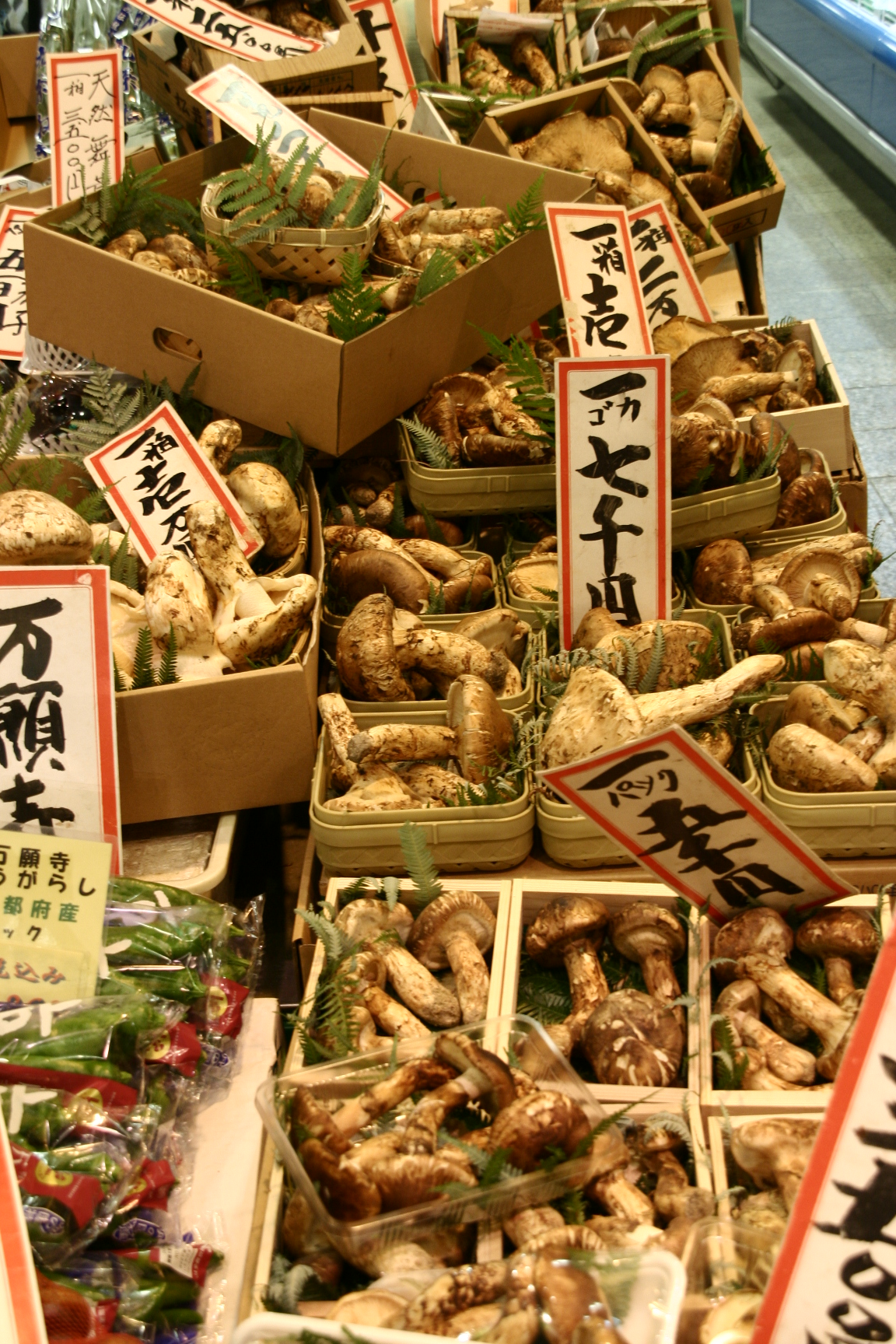

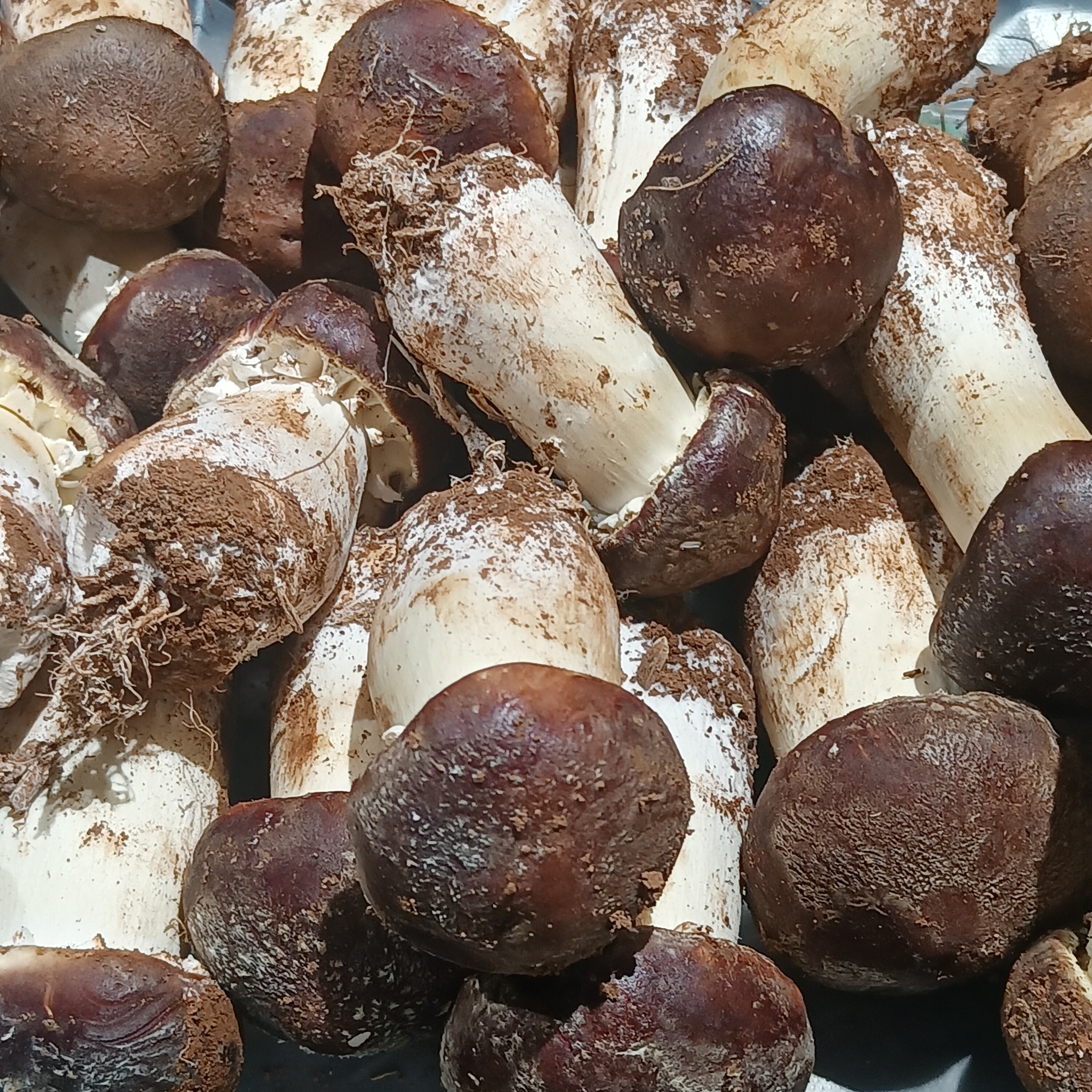

== Ecology ==
Insects are also known to target these mushrooms as food and a place to lay their eggs, limiting the amount of the mushrooms that can be harvested by human gatherers.

Matsutake are hard to find because of their specific growth requirements, the rarity of appropriate forest and terrain, and competition from wild animals such as squirrels, rabbits, and deer for the once-yearly harvest of mushrooms. Domestic production of matsutake in Japan has also been sharply reduced over the latter half of the 20th century due to the pine-killing nematode Bursaphelenchus xylophilus.

== Market ==
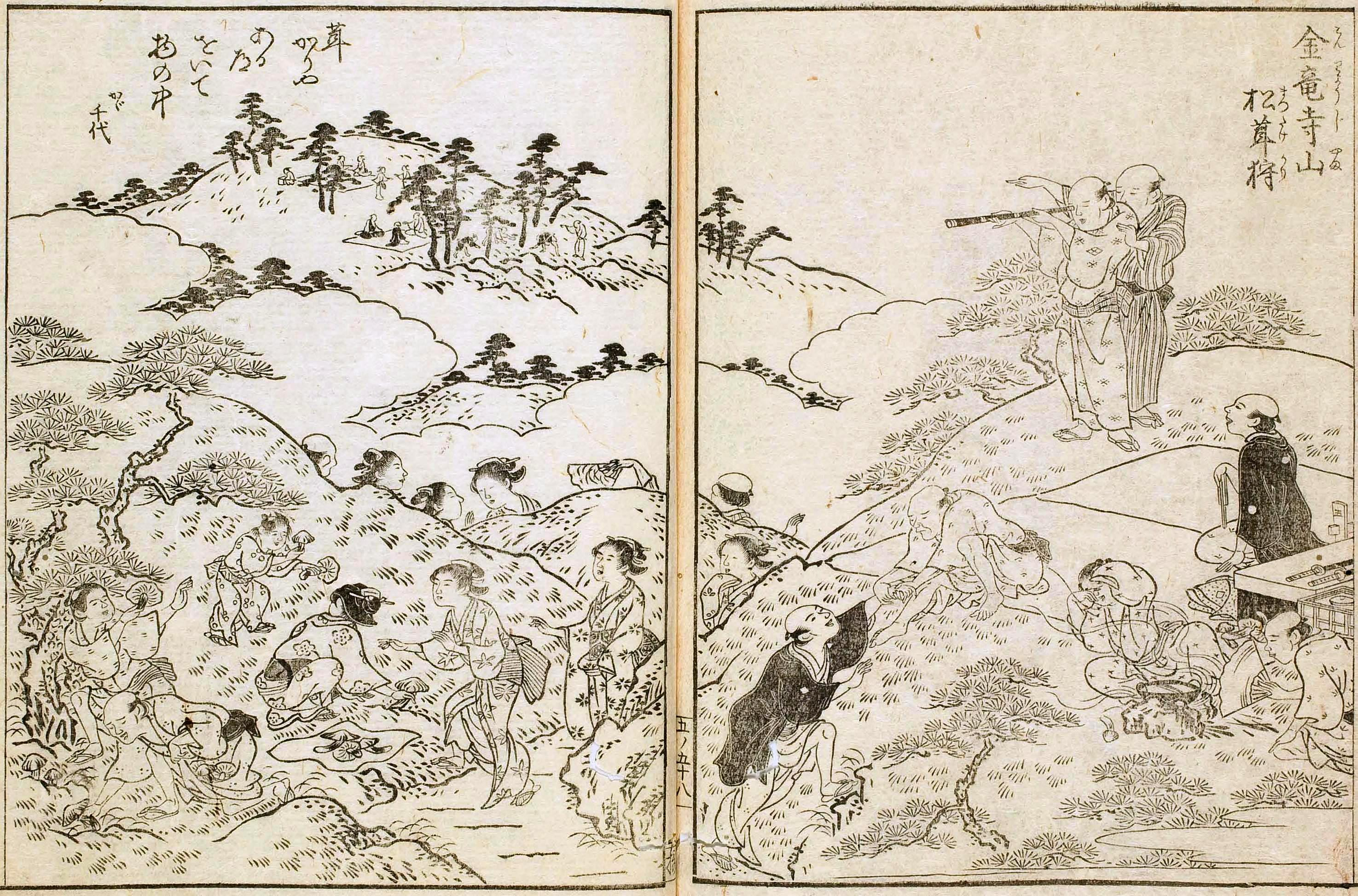
Matsutake Hunting in the Mountains, 18th-century print by Niwa Tōkei (丹羽 桃渓)

Matsutake is prized in Japanese cuisine for its distinct spicy-aromatic odor. The annual harvest of matsutake in Japan is now less than 1,000 tons, with the Japanese mushroom supply largely made up by imports from China, Korea, the Pacific Northwest, British Columbia, and northern Europe. This results in prices in the Japanese market highly dependent on quality, availability, and origin that can range from as high as $1,000 per kilogram ($450 per pound) for domestically harvested matsutake at the beginning of the season to as low as $4.41/kg ($2/lb), though the average value for imported matsutake is about $90/kg ($41/lb).

In the 1940s, the abundance of the mushrooms in Japan made them accessible to the general public after long being considered a luxury good, but after the decline of these mushrooms in the region, international trade for them created a fluctuating market that sometimes became very lucrative for the regions of the world that these mushrooms grow in, such as Yunnan Province of Southwest China. Very few countries other than Korea had a preexisting economy for matsutake, and Japanese speculators scoped out regions to market the fungi. Certain regions garner a higher price as well, with regions such as North America seeing a higher price by weight than regions such as those in Southwest China.

The price gathered for matsutake in Japan can vary based on the state of the mushroom. Frozen or dried matsutake are less sought after than fresh ones in luxury markets, meaning that the international trade must be done at a quick pace to keep the mushrooms from decaying.

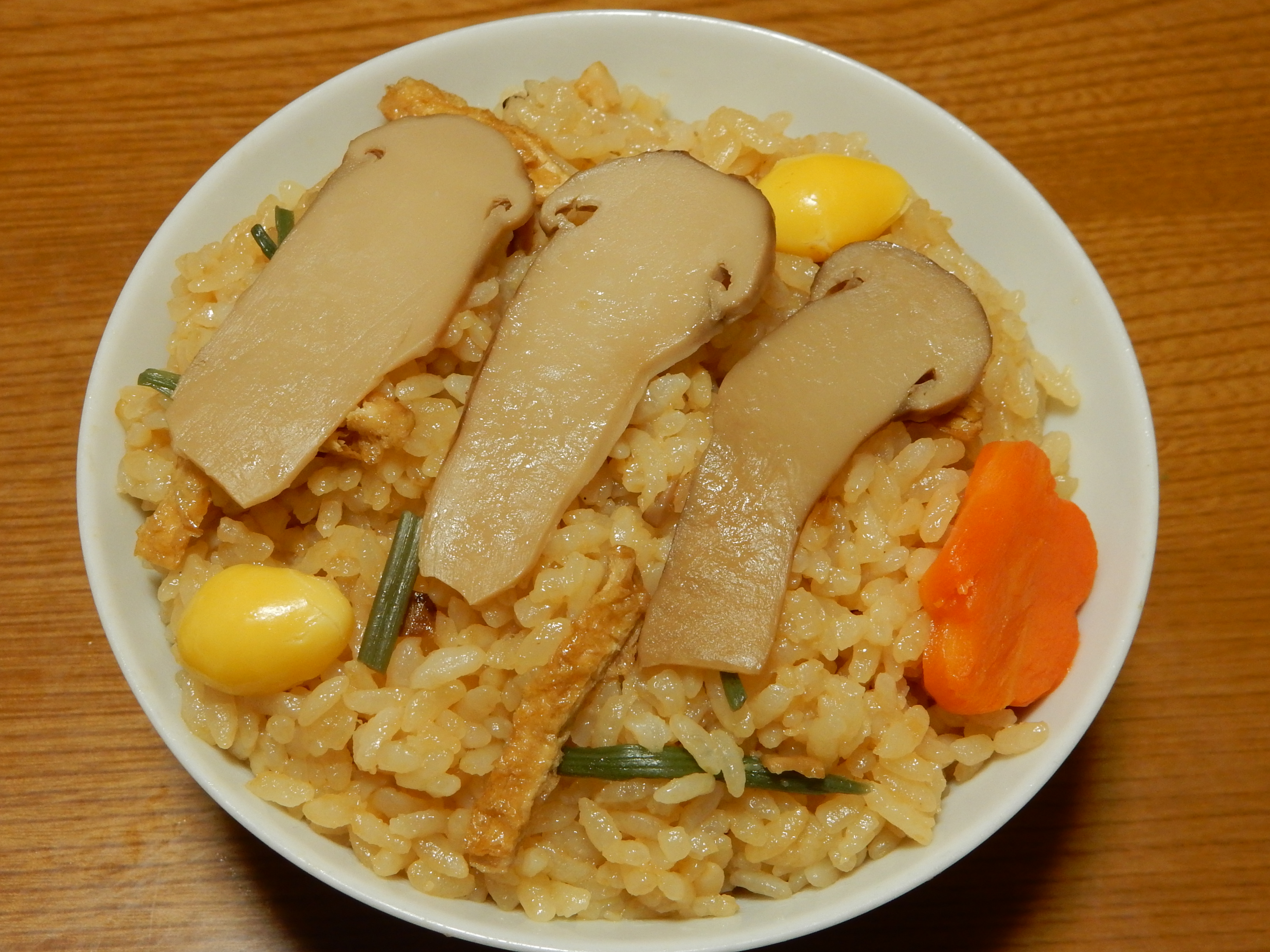
In takikomi gohan

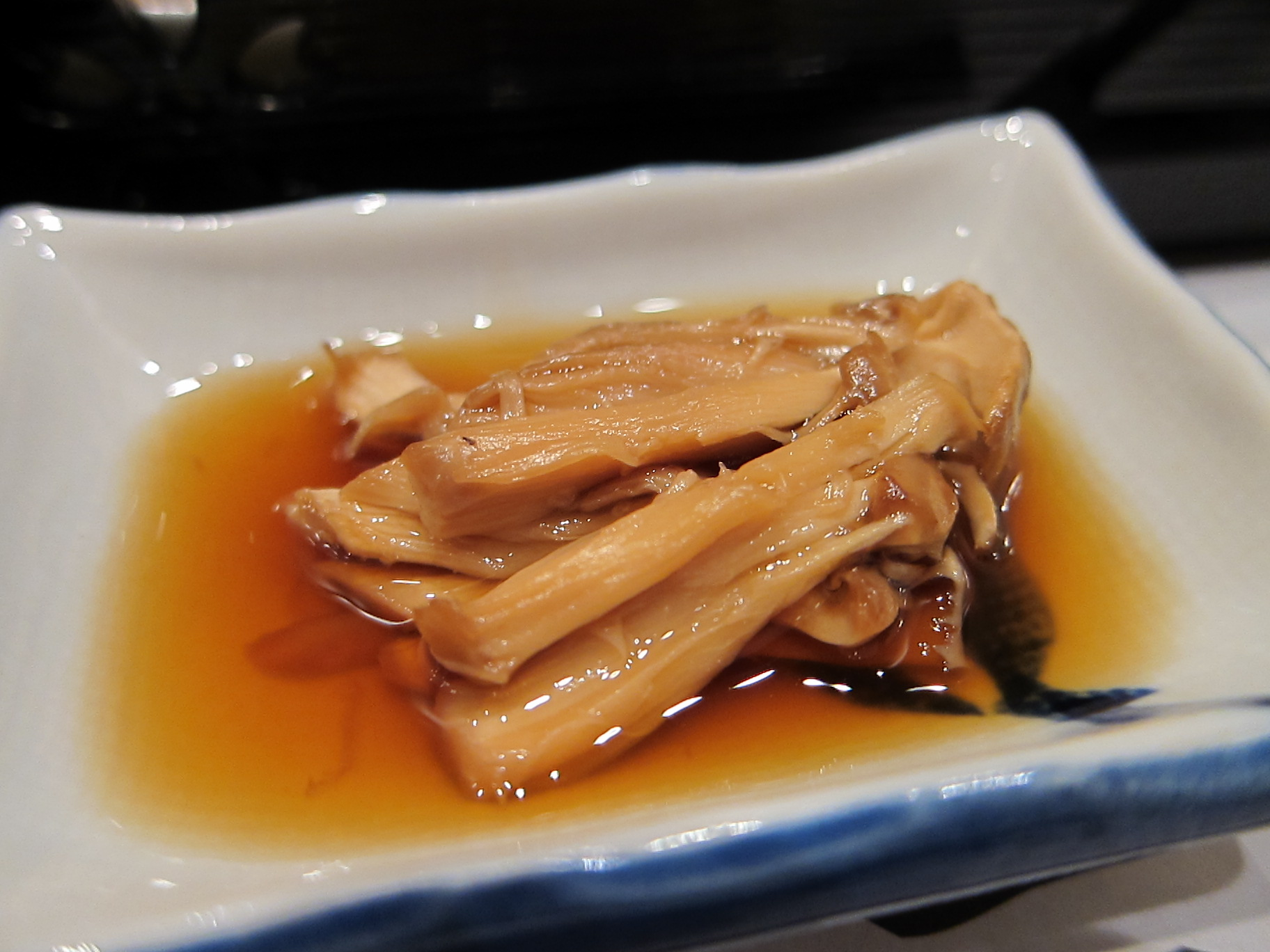
In jorim

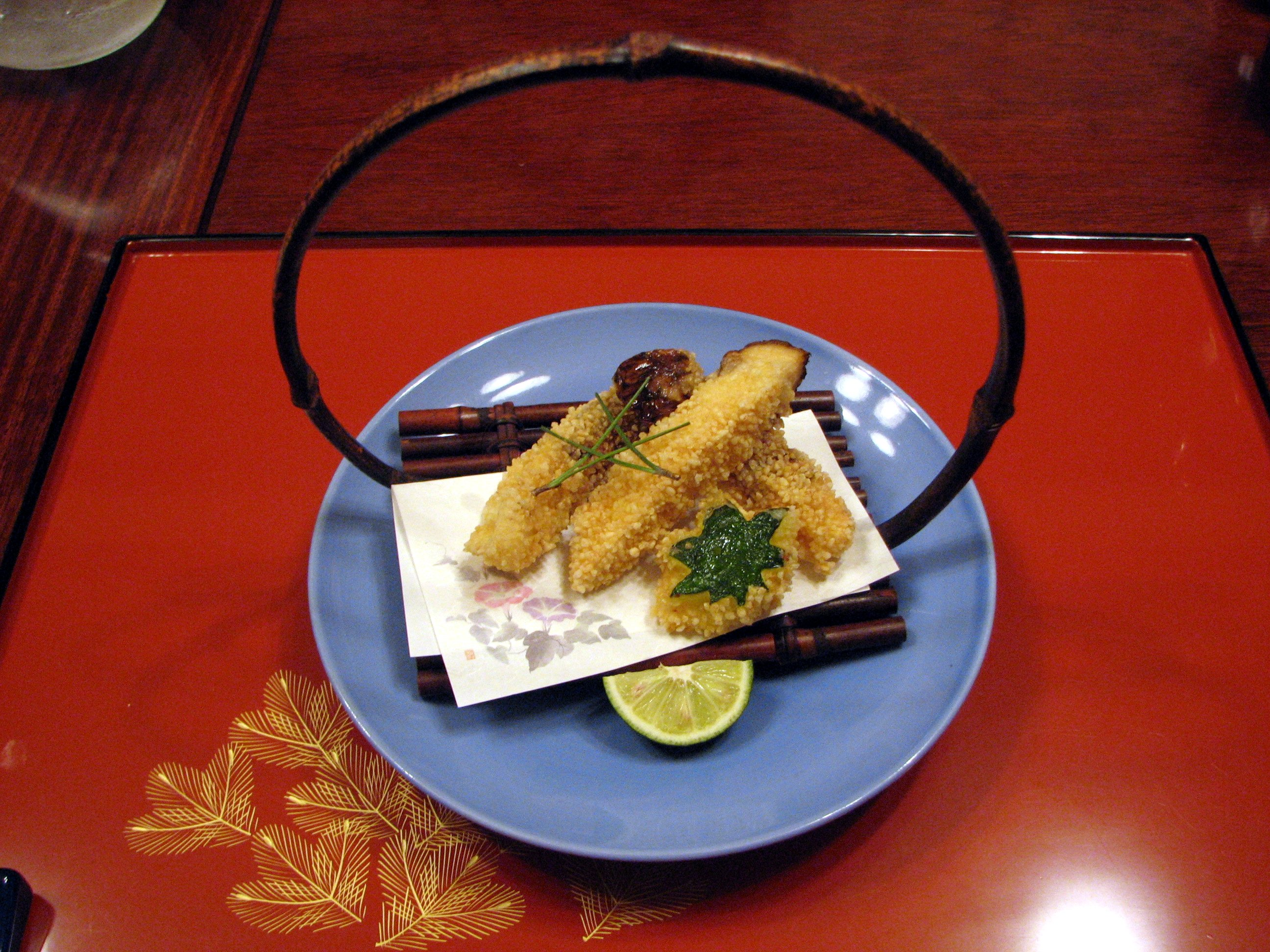
Fried

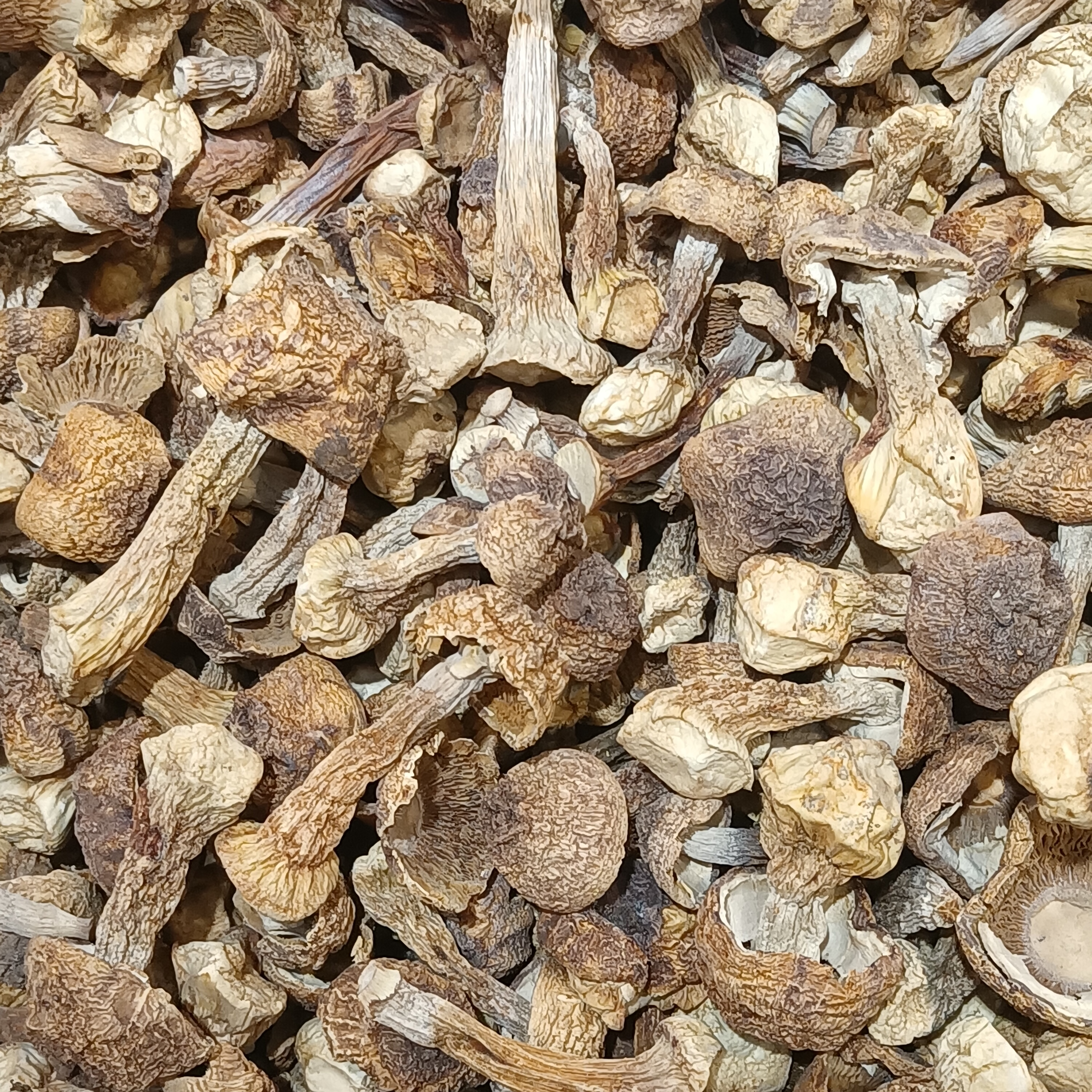
Dried

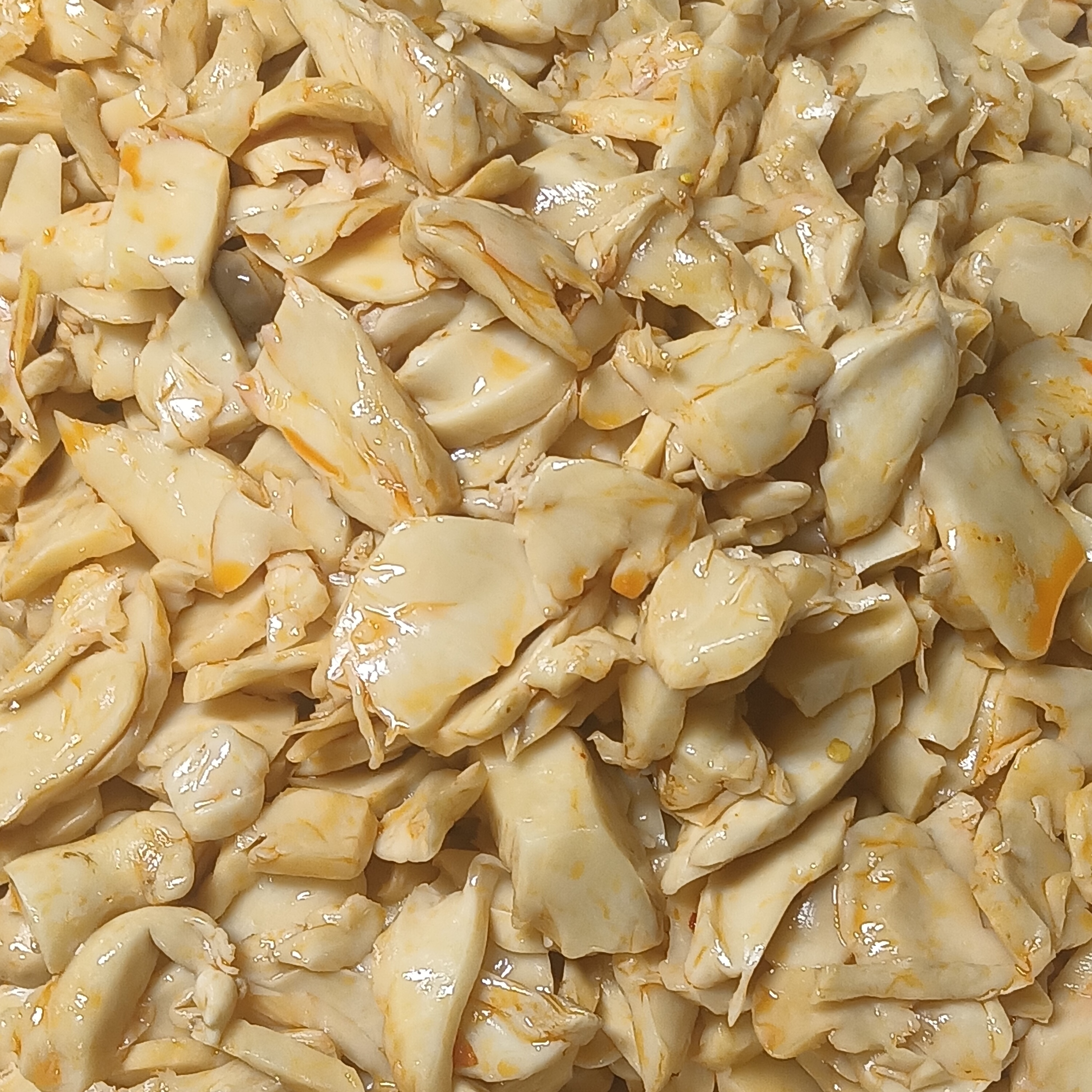
With sesame oil

== See also ==
- Himematsutake: the "princess matsutake"
- List of Tricholoma species
- Medicinal fungi
- The Mushroom at the End of the World – 2015 book by anthropologist Anna Tsing
