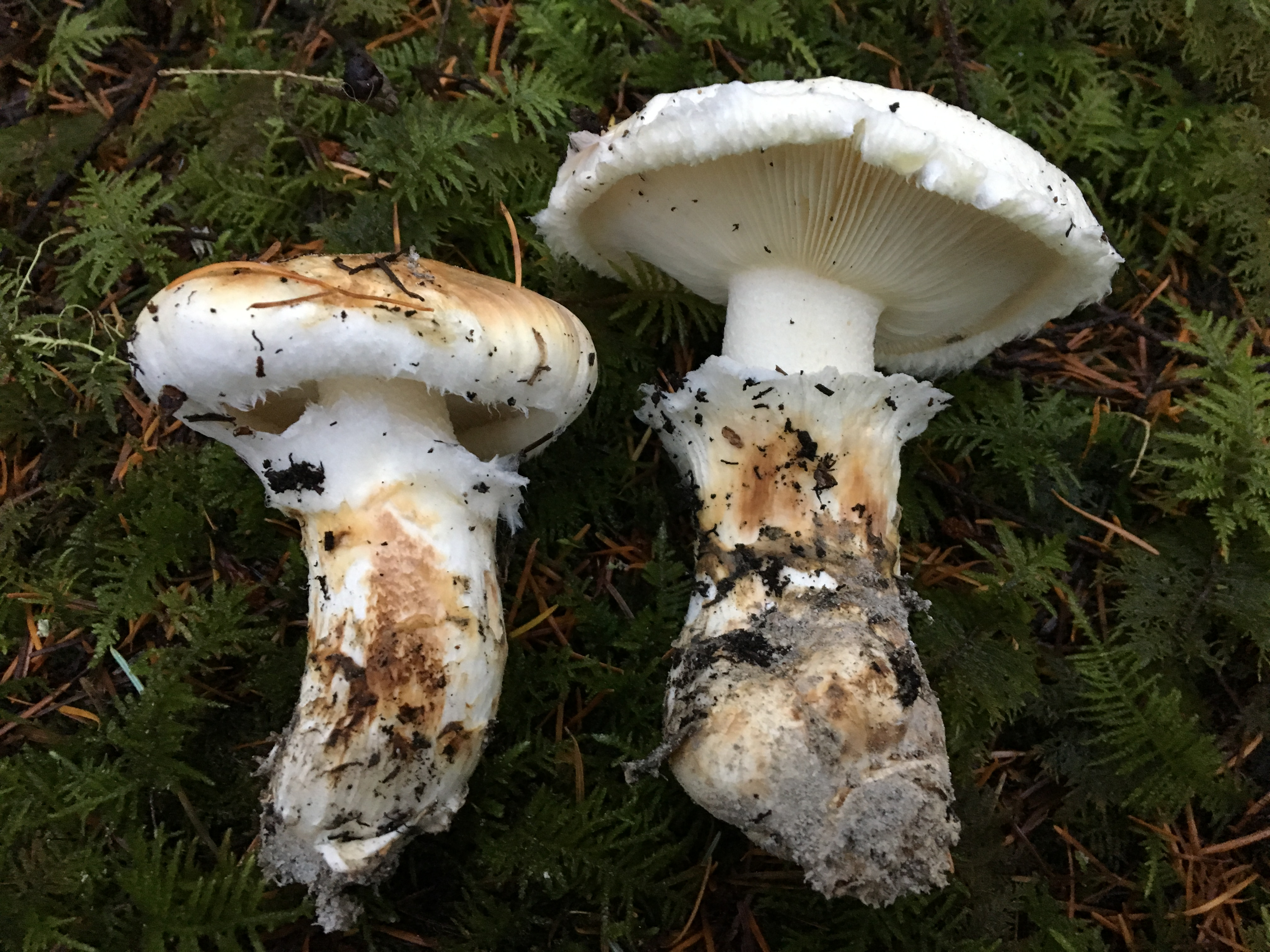

Scientific classification
- Kingdom: Fungi
- Division: Basidiomycota
- Class: Agaricomycetes
- Order: Agaricales
- Family: Tricholomataceae
- Genus: Tricholoma
- Species: T. murrillianum

Binomial name
- Tricholoma murrillianum Singer (1942)

= Tricholoma murrillianum =

Species of fungus

Tricholoma murrillianum
- Mycological characteristics
- Gills on hymenium
- Cap is convex
- Hymenium is adnate or adnexed
- Stipe has a ring
- Spore print is white
- Ecology is mycorrhizal
- Edibility is choice

Tricholoma murrillianum is a species of mushroom-forming fungus found in North America also known as the ponderosa mushroom, pine mushroom, and Western matsutake. It produces a choice edible mushroom but can be confused with the poisonous Amanita smithiana.

== Taxonomy ==
It belongs to the genus Tricholoma in the matsutake species complex, which includes the closely related East Asian songi or matsutake as well as the American matsutake (T. magnivelare) and Mexican matsutake (T. mesoamericanum), found in southern North America.

It was previously included with the American matsutake, T. magnivelare, but in 2017 research based on molecular analysis separated the two and determined that T. magnivelare is limited to the eastern half of North America.

== Description ==
It is a gilled mushroom, colored mostly white with hints of tan. It is ectomycorrhizal.

The cap grows up to 18 centimetres (7 in) wide. The gills are very close. The stem is up to 14 cm (5 1/2 in) long with partial veil remnants present. The taste is mild. The spore print is white.

=== Similar species ===
The Western matsutake can be distinguished from its Asian counterparts by its whiter color, and from its North American counterparts by range, which does not overlap. T. magnivelare and T. mesoamericanum tend to be darker in cap coloration, though all three can stain reddish brown with handling when mature. T. murrillianum also has a smoother pileus than the eastern T. magnivelare. It can also be confused with Tricholoma dulciolens, the bitter matsutake, but that species has brownish scales and typically has a bitter taste.

It can also be confused with the poisonous Amanita smithiana.

== Distribution and habitat ==
T. murrillianum is found in western North America from October to January, especially on the West Coast in sandy soil, along with pines, Douglas-fir, tanoak, madrone, and manzanita.

== Cultivation ==
As Japanese production of T. matsutake has declined with the growing presence of the pine-killing nematode, Bursaphelenchus xylophilus, there is an increasingly global matsutake harvesting market of related species. Exports from western North America bloomed over the last four decades, driving prices to a peak in the 1990s when Western matsutakes reached up to $600 per pound. Prices have since declined dramatically, but the annual matsutake harvest still drives economies in many rural Pacific Northwest areas.

Button matsutakes are especially prized, and illegal raking of wild matsutake patches can cause serious ecological damage. Matsutake harvests in the Pacific Northwest have been on the decline in recent years, possibly as a result of deep raking and over-harvesting.

== Uses ==
Matsutakes including T. murrillianum are choice edible mushrooms with high desirability, especially in Asian cuisine. They are prized for their distinctive spicy odor and flavor and firm, meaty texture. Serious poisonings have occurred due to confusion with poisonous look-alikes, most notably Amanita smithiana.

== See also ==
- List of Tricholoma species
- List of North American Tricholoma
