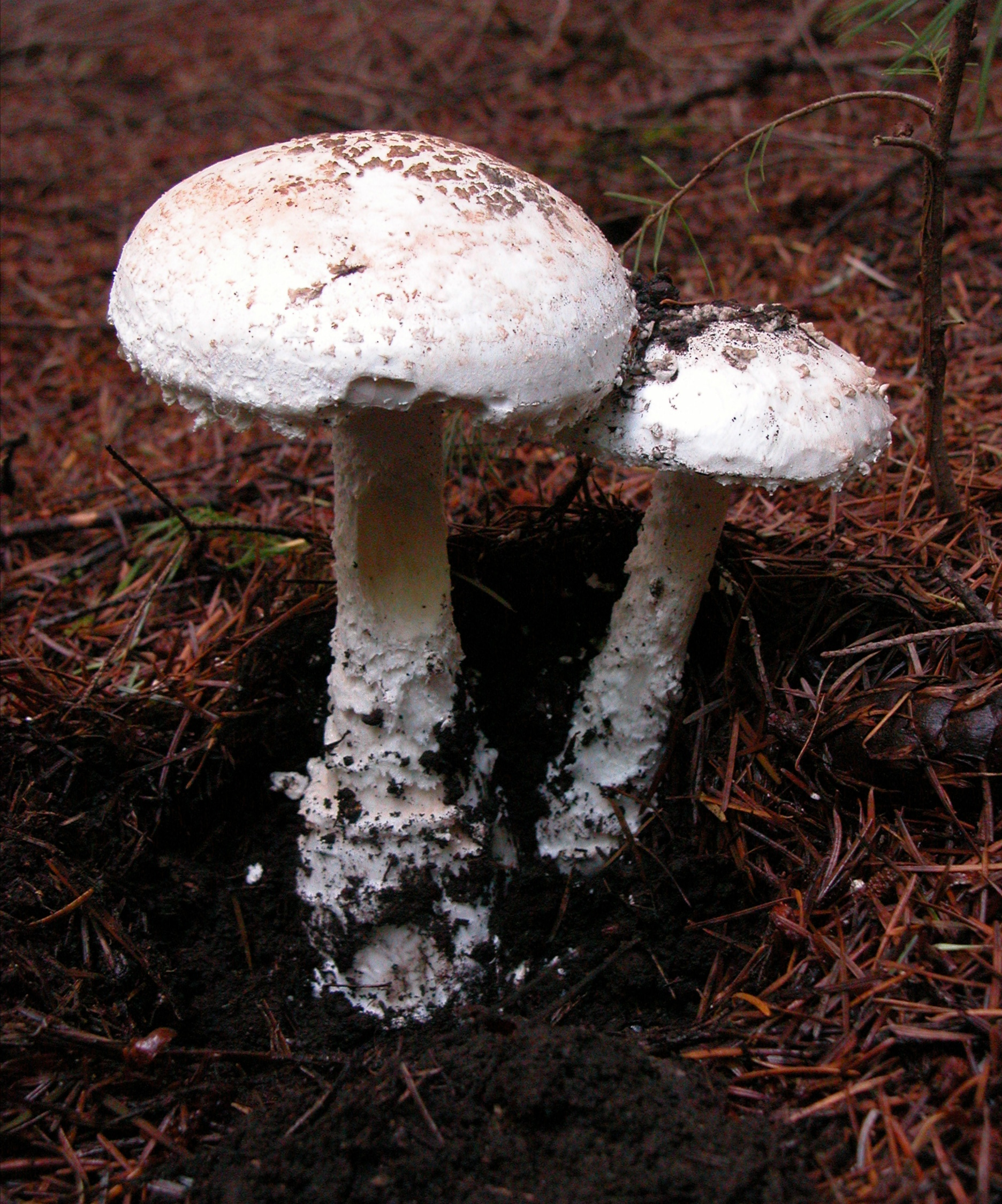

Conservation status
- Least Concern (IUCN 3.1)

Scientific classification
- Kingdom: Fungi
- Division: Basidiomycota
- Class: Agaricomycetes
- Order: Agaricales
- Family: Amanitaceae
- Genus: Amanita
- Species: A. smithiana

Binomial name
- Amanita smithiana Bas (1969)

= Amanita smithiana =

Species of fungus

Amanita smithiana Mycological characteristics
- Gills on hymenium
- Cap is convex or flat
- Hymenium is free
- Stipe has a ring and volva
- Spore print is white
- Ecology is mycorrhizal
- Edibility is poisonous

Amanita smithiana, also known as Smith's amanita, is a species of agaric found on soil in coniferous (Abies, Tsuga, Pseudotsuga) and broadleaved (Alnus, Quercus) woodland in the Pacific Northwest of North America. It fruits in August and September.

== Description ==
The cap has a diameter of 5–17 centimetres (2–6 1/2 inches) and is white and scaled with remnants of the universal veil. The stipe is 6–18 cm (2 1/2–7 in) long by 1–3.5 cm (1/2–1 1/2 in) thick, white and similarly scaled, with a ring. The spores are ellipsoid to elongated, amyloid, and measure 11–12.5 by 7–8 μm.

== Taxonomy ==
Amanita smithiana was described by Dutch mycologist Cornelis Bas in 1969. The specific epithet honors mycologist Alexander H. Smith, who collected the type specimens from Washington in 1941. It belongs in the subgenus Lepidella.

== Toxicity ==
It is responsible for poisonings in the Pacific Northwest when mistaken for the edible and sought after Tricholoma murrillianum (Western matsutake). It causes initial gastrointestinal symptoms that manifest 1 to 12 hours after eating the mushrooms, followed by acute nephritis after a delay of 2–6 days. Hemodialysis appears to be an effective treatment and most patients recover normal kidney function within several weeks of ingestion.

It is thought that A. smithiana toxicity is from chlorocrotylglycine and allenic norleucine.

Several similar species have been implicated in similar cases of poisoning: A. sphaerobulbosa, Saproamanita thiersii, A. proxima, (Spain) and A. pseudoporphyria (Japan).

== See also ==
- List of Amanita species
