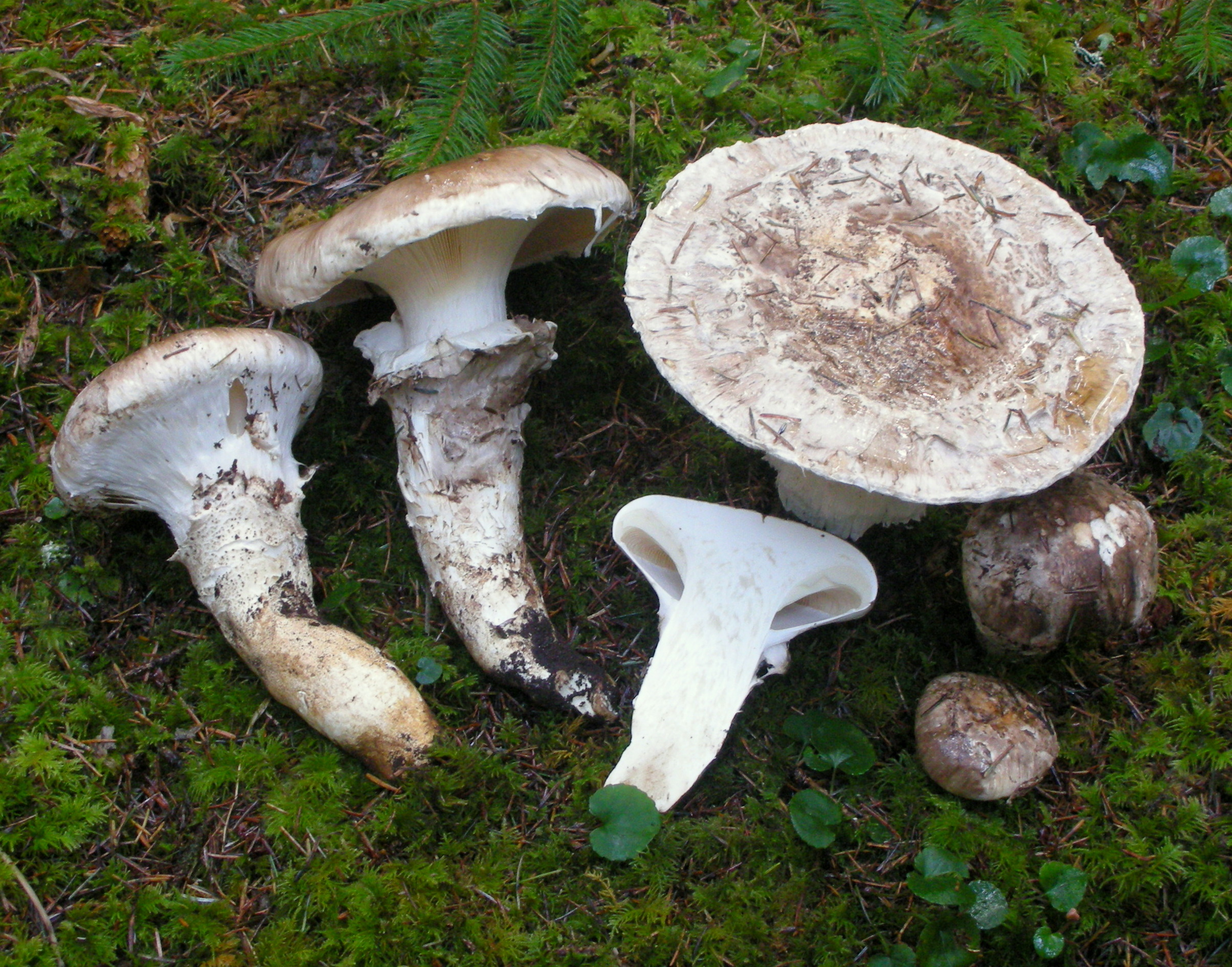
- Catathelasma ventricosum, USA

Scientific classification
- Kingdom: Fungi
- Division: Basidiomycota
- Class: Agaricomycetes
- Order: Agaricales
- Family: Biannulariaceae; Jülich (1981)

Type genus
- Catathelasma Lovejoy (1910)

Genera
- Bonomyces; Catathelasma; Cleistocybe

Synonyms
- Catathelasmataceae Wasser (1985)

= Biannulariaceae =

Family of fungi

The Biannulariaceae are a family of fungi in the order Agaricales. The family contains three genera. All species form agaricoid basidiocarps (gilled mushrooms). The family was originally described to accommodate the single genus Catathelasma, but has been extended as a result of DNA research.
