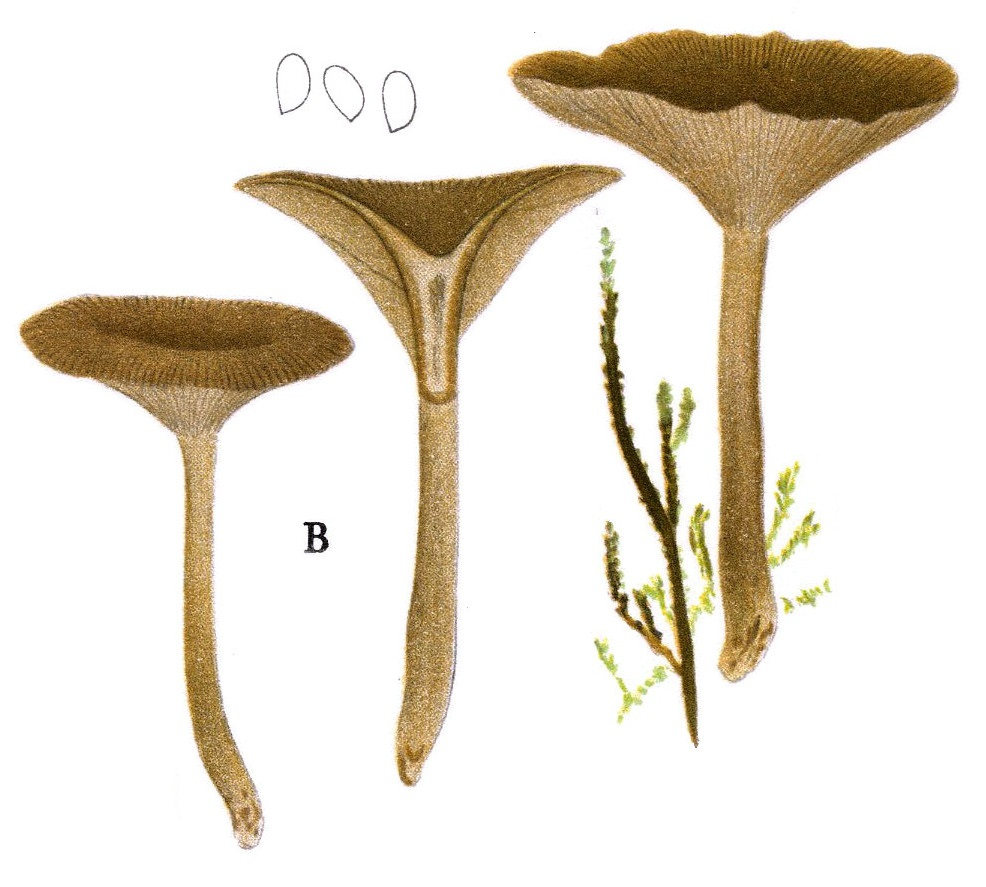

Scientific classification
- Domain: Eukaryota
- Kingdom: Fungi
- Division: Basidiomycota
- Class: Agaricomycetes
- Order: Agaricales
- Family: Clitocybaceae
- Genus: Clitocybe
- Species: C. subcordispora

Binomial name
- Clitocybe subcordispora Harmaja (1969)

= Clitocybe subcordispora =

Species of mushroom-forming fungus

Clitocybe subcordispora is a rare species of mushroom-forming fungus first described by the Finnish mycologist Harri Harmaja in 1969. It is characterized by its brownish, hygrophanous cap with red tints, pure white spore print, and distinctive subcordiform (somewhat heart-shaped) spores measuring 4.2–6.2 by 3.0–4.0 micrometres. This saprotrophic fungus grows in rows or arcs in dry, nutrient-poor heath forests dominated by pine or spruce, occasionally under Siberian larch or among mosses. The species is known only from hemiboreal and southern boreal zones of eastern Finland and is considered very rare.

== Taxonomy ==
Clitocybe subcordispora was formally described by the Finnish mycologist Harri Harmaja in 1969. The holotype was collected on 21 September 1967 in a dryish heath forest dominated by Picea and Pinus near Päijärvi, Vehkalahti, in South Karelia, Finland; an isotype (duplicate) is preserved at the herbarium of the University of Michigan.

== Description ==
The cap (cap is 3–6.5 cm broad, hygrophanous (changing colour as it dries) and non‑pruinose, with weak striations at the margin. When fresh it appears brownish—often with red tints—and in dried specimens it fades to pale brown; the disc remains darker in all stages. The cap is convex to plane, never deeply funnel‑shaped, and its surface is dry to slightly slippery, developing dense concentric wrinkles upon drying.

The stipe measures 3–8 cm by 4–8 (rarely up to 14) mm, the same colour as or a little paler than the cap. It is solid at first, becoming hollow with age, cylindrical (terete) to slightly compressed, and bears a fine tomentum at the base and a very thin fibrillose coating near the top.

The lamellae are obliquely adnate to shortly decurrent, attaching at an angle of 10–60°. They occur in four tiers, with 30–50 reaching the stipe, and measure 3–5 mm broad at mid‑length—about three times the thickness of the underlying flesh. When moist they are pale brownish with red‑brown spots; in dried specimens they turn grey‑brown to pale brown. The odour of the mushroom is fungoid and the taste mild and fungoid.

Microscopically, the spores measure 4.2–6.2 by 3.0–4.0 micrometres (μm), are obtuse at the base and vary from somewhat spherical (globose) to broadly ellipsoid, obovate or subcordiform; most contain one large or several small oil droplets, and the apiculus is about 0.6–0.8 by 0.4–0.5 μm. The spore deposit is pure white. Under the microscope, the cap cuticle (pileipellis) is nearly colourless, 30–60 μm thick, with hyphae 2.0–5.0 μm wide that are parallel to lightly interwoven and bear scant intracellular and intercellular pigments; the subcutis is a darker layer 50–80 μm thick, composed of 2.0–6.0 μm hyphae rich in membranal pigment.

Clitocybe subcordispora is similar to species in the Clitocybe metachroa complex, but can be distinguished from them by its smaller spores, which measure 4.5–6.0 by 3.0–4.0 μm.

== Habitat and distribution ==
Clitocybe subcordispora is saprotrophic, fruiting in rows or arcs in dry, nutrient‑poor heath forests dominated by Pinus or Picea, occasionally under Larix sibirica or among mosses such as Pleurozium, Hylocomium, and Dicranum. Fruiting bodies appear from early September to early November.

The species is known only from hemiboreal and southern boreal zones of eastern Finland, up to about 100 m elevation, and is regarded as very rare.
