= Clitocybe strigosa =

Scientific classification
- Kingdom: Fungi
- Division: Basidiomycota
- Class: Agaricomycetes
- Order: Agaricales
- Family: Clitocybaceae
- Genus: Clitocybe
- Species: C. strigosa

Binomial name
- Clitocybe strigosa Harmaja (1969)

Species of mushroom-forming fungus

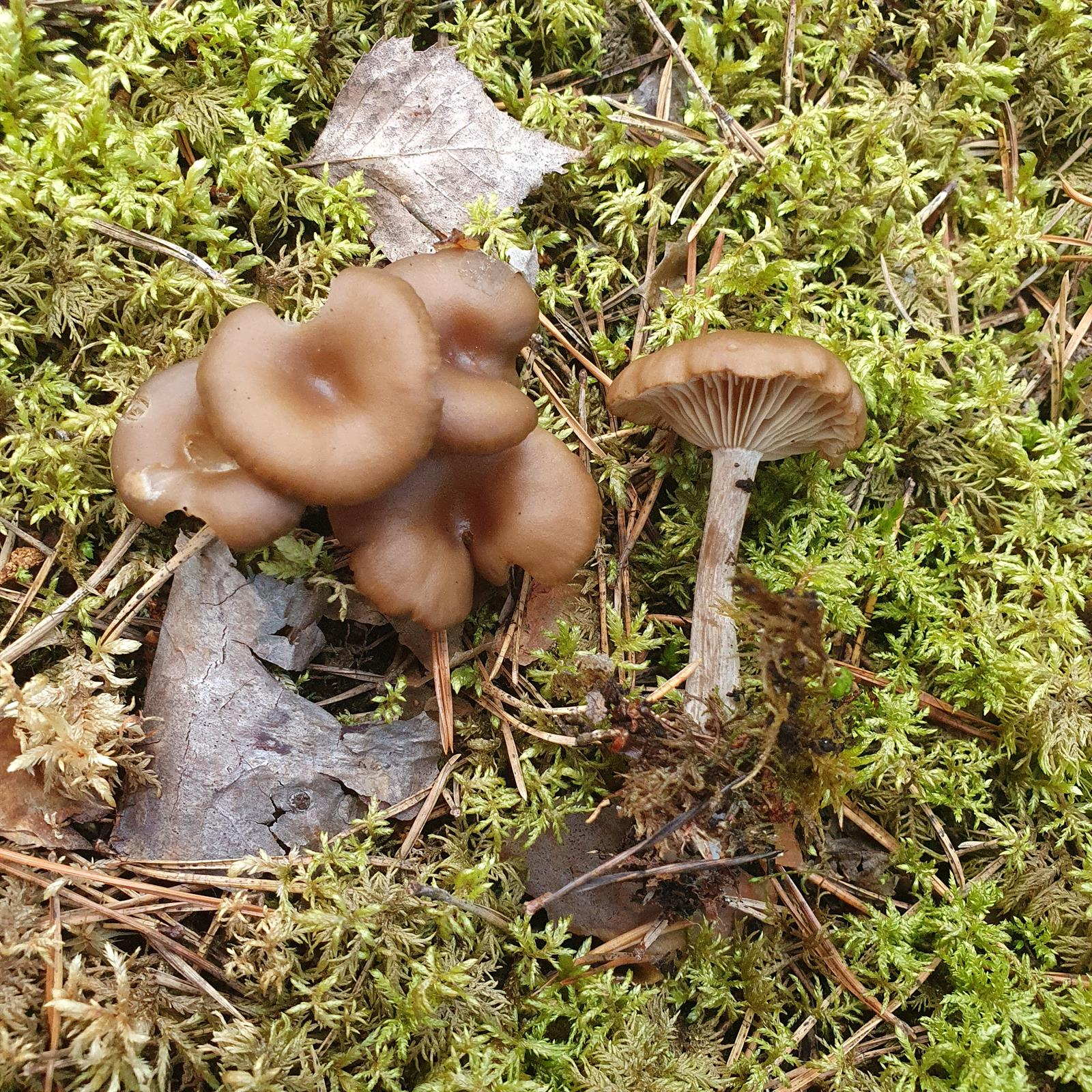

Clitocybe strigosa is a species of mushroom-forming fungus first described by the Finnish mycologist Harri Harmaja in 1969. It is characterized by its chestnut to greyish-brown, hygrophanous cap, pale yellow spore print with a faint greyish tint, and cyanophilic spores that readily absorb blue dyes due to their mucilaginous outer layer. This saprotrophic fungus grows in coniferous and deciduous forests, often in deep moss carpets under spruce or beech, and occasionally on calcareous heaths above the tree line. The species shows a disjunct distribution in Fennoscandia, occurring in both alpine, calcareous zones and southern boreal lowland zones.

== Taxonomy ==
Clitocybe strigosa was described as new to science by the Finnish mycologist Harri Harmaja in 1969. The holotype was collected on 15 October 1965 in a grass–herb forest under spruce at Jalassaari, rural district of Lohja, Southern Finland, by Harri Toppari (now Harmaja); an isotype (duplicate) is preserved at the herbarium of the University of Michigan.

== Description ==
The cap (pileus) is 2.5–6.5 cm broad, hygrophanous (changing colour as it dries) and non‑pruinose, with weak translucent striations at the margin. When fresh it is chestnut to greyish‑brown, the disc sometimes darker; in dried specimens it browns to a pale yellowish‑brown. The cap is convex to plane, often becoming umbilicate (with a small central depression), and the surface dries smooth and matt, showing faint concentric wrinkles in dried herbarium specimens (Latin: specimina exsiccata).

The stem measures 3–11 cm by 3–15 mm, concolorous with or slightly paler than the cap. It is equal or barely tapered at the base, solid at first then hollowing out, cylindrical (terete) to somewhat compressed, and bears a very thin pale fibrillose (hair‑like) coating—especially at the apex—and occasional scant tomentum or rhizoid‑like hyphae at the base.

The gills are very short‑decurrent to narrowly adnate, attaching at angles of 10–60°. They occur in three to four tiers, with 25–35 reaching the stipe, and are 4–6 mm broad at mid‑length—about three times broader than the underlying context. When moist they are pale brown‑grey; in older specimens they turn grey‑brown to hoary. The odour of the mushroom is faintly fungoid and the taste is mild.

Microscopically, the spores measure 5.4–10.2 by 3.4–5.2 micrometres (μm), broadly ellipsoid with obtuse bases, often with a slight asymmetrical constriction and containing guttules (oil droplets); the apiculus is 0.8–1.0 by 0.7–0.9 μm. Spores are mostly single, seldom in pairs, and yield an abundant, pale yellow spore print with a faint greyish tint. The spores of C. strigosa are cyanophilic, meaning they readily absorb blue dyes such as lactophenol cotton blue, due to a mucilaginous outer layer (myxosporium) of the spore wall that is absent in non-cyanophilic species.

Under the microscope, the cap cuticle (pileipellis) is 25–40 μm thick, with hyphae 2.5–7.0 μm wide, parallel to lightly interwoven, and bearing intracellular and membranal pigments; the subcutis is 100–120 μm thick, with similar hyphae and richer pigment concentrated in the lower layer.

== Habitat and distribution ==
Clitocybe strigosa is saprotrophic, occurring solitary, in groups, rows or arcs in coniferous and deciduous grass–herb to mesic heath forests, often in deep moss carpets under Picea or Fagus and occasionally on calcareous heaths above the tree line. Fruiting bodies appear from early August to mid‑October.

In Fennoscandia the species shows two disjunct distribution areas: an alpine, calcareous zone and a southern boreal lowland zone where it is less dependent on high lime concentrations in the soil. Populations in the alpine zone likely overwintered through the last glaciation, whereas lowland populations arrived later from the east and southeast.
