= Clitocybe fennica =

Scientific classification
- Domain: Eukaryota
- Kingdom: Fungi
- Division: Basidiomycota
- Class: Agaricomycetes
- Order: Agaricales
- Family: Clitocybaceae
- Genus: Clitocybe
- Species: C. fennica

Binomial name
- Clitocybe fennica Harmaja (1969)

Species of mushroom-forming fungus

Clitocybe fennica is a species of mushroom-forming fungus, formally described by the Finnish mycologist Harri Harmaja in 1969. The fungus produces fruit bodies with chocolate brown caps that become funnel-shaped with age, paired with brownish gills and a stipe matching the cap's colour. It grows as a decomposer on forest floor litter, typically on spruce needles or mixed spruce-poplar debris in mesic heath and grass-herb forests. Initially thought to be confined to hemiboreal and southern boreal zones of eastern Finland, where it is very rare, the species has since been recorded in western Siberia.

== Taxonomy ==
Clitocybe fennica was formally described by the Finnish mycologist Harri Harmaja in 1969. The holotype was collected on 27 October 1968 in a grass–herb forest among Picea needles near Virkkala in the rural district of Lohja, Southwest Finland; an isotype (duplicate) is preserved at the herbarium of the University of Michigan. The species epithet fennica refers to Finland, where it was first documented for science.

== Description ==
The cap pileus of C. fennica is 2.5–4.0 cm broad, hygrophanous (changing colour as it dries), non‑pruinose and weakly translucent‑striate up to one‑third of the radius. When fresh the cap is chocolate brown with a slightly darker disc; in older specimens it fades to dirty pale brown or greyish brown. Initially plane, the margin soon becomes slightly umbilicate and, at maturity, infundibuliform (funnel-shaped); the surface is slightly viscid, shining and smooth, becoming concentrically wrinkled when dried.

The stipe measures 3–5 cm by 2–5 mm, concolorous with or a little paler than the cap, equal and solid at first before hollowing, terete to slightly compressed in age. Its surface is dry, somewhat shining and glabrous (smooth and hairless), with scanty tomentum and occasional rhizoids at the base.

The gills are short‑decurrent, forming an attachment angle of about 30–40°. They occur in four tiers of roughly 30–50 reaching the stipe, are up to 3–4 mm broad near mid‑length and about three times wider than the underlying context. When moist they appear dirty brownish, turning paler in dried specimens; they are not forked but may anastomose weakly.

The odour is fungoid (sometimes slightly musty in old fruiting bodies) and the taste is mild and fungoid. Microscopically, the spores measure 5.5–8.0 by 2.8–3.3 μm, are broadly ellipsoid to oblong with obtuse bases, often guttulate (with oil droplets), and bear an apiculus about 0.6–1.0 by 0.5–0.7 μm; the spore deposit colour is unknown.

Under the microscope, the cap cuticle (epicutis) forms a 25–70 μm layer of parallel hyphae 1.5–4.0 μm wide with scattered intracellular and encrusted pigments; beneath this, a distinct subcutis 15–30 μm thick comprises parallel hyphae 3.0–7.0 μm wide bearing abundant pigmented encrustations.

== Habitat and distribution ==
Clitocybe fennica is saprotrophic, occurring solitary or in small, indistinct arcs in mesic heath and grass‑herb forests, typically on litter of Picea or mixed Picea–Populus debris. Fruiting bodies appear in October. The species was initially thought to be confined to hemiboreal and southern boreal zones of eastern Finland near sea level, where it is very rare. It has since been recorded in western Sibera.
