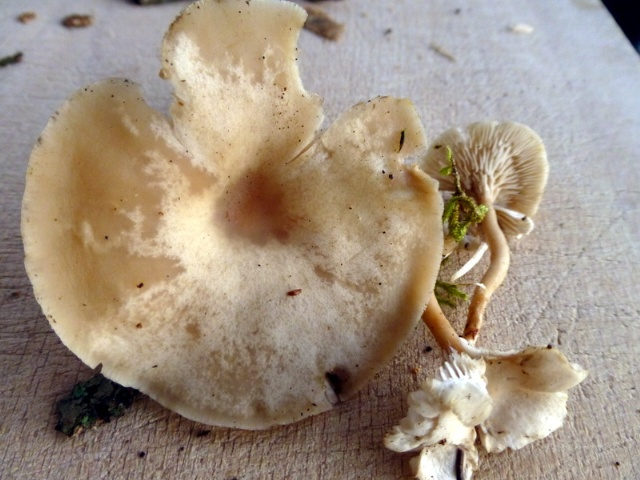

Scientific classification
- Domain: Eukaryota
- Kingdom: Fungi
- Division: Basidiomycota
- Class: Agaricomycetes
- Order: Agaricales
- Family: Clitocybaceae
- Genus: Clitocybe
- Species: C. marginella

Binomial name
- Clitocybe marginella Harmaja (1969)

Synonyms
- Lepista marginella (Harmaja) Harmaja (1976); Pseudolyophyllum marginellum (Harmaja) Raithelh. (1979)

= Clitocybe marginella =

Species of mushroom-forming fungus

Clitocybe marginella is a species of mushroom-forming fungus formally described by the Finnish mycologist Harri Harmaja in 1967. The fungus produces fruit bodies with thin, moisture-sensitive caps that often display a distinctive whitish, powdery marginal band and emit a faint fruity odour reminiscent of strawberries that intensifies as they dry. It grows as a decomposer on forest floor litter, typically under pine or spruce trees, and is often associated with mosses such as Pleurozium and Dicranum. The species occurs in temperate to northern boreal zones of southern Scandinavia and Finland, where it is considered uncommon, typically appearing from late August to late November.

== Taxonomy ==
Clitocybe marginella was formally described as a new species by the Finnish mycologist Harri Harmaja in 1967. The holotype was collected on 17 September 1967 in a coniferous wood near Suoniini, Somero, in the province of Etelä‑Häme, Finland; an isotype (duplicate) is preserved at the herbarium of the University of Michigan.

== Description ==
The fruit bodies (basidiocarps) of C. marginella bear a thin, hygrophanous cap (pileus) measuring 2–6.5 cm across that, when moist, often shows a whitish, pruinose marginal band 1–2 mm wide and becomes translucent‑striate up to halfway to the disc; with age the cap flattens and may develop a shallow central depression. The slender stipe is 3–10 cm long and 2.5–8 mm thick, initially whitish but maturing to match the cap colour; it often hollows out, occasionally narrows toward the base, and bears sparse whitish tomentum at its base.

The short lamellae run slightly down the stem (decurrent by 4–5 mm), are arranged in about four tiers, first pale then buff, usually broadest near the stem and sometimes lightly anastomosing in maturity. The odour is faintly fruity—often compared to strawberries—and grows stronger as the fruit bodies dry; the taste is mild and fungoid.

Microscopically, the spores measure 4.6–6.0 by 2.4–3.3(–3.6) μm, are broadly ellipsoid to oblong with an obtuse base and a small apiculus about 0.6–0.7 by 0.4–0.5 μm, and yield a pinkish‑buff spore print.

The cap cuticle (epicutis) is 30–50 μm thick, composed of parallel hyphae 2.0–6.0 μm wide with scant intracellular pigment; the underlying subcutis is 40–70 μm thick, made up of interwoven hyphae 4.0–8.0 μm wide and devoid of pigment.

== Habitat and distribution ==
C. marginella is saprotrophic, fruiting solitarily or in small arcs and rings on litter under Pinus or Picea, occasionally among Juniperus, alder, birch or goat willow, and often associated with mosses such as Pleurozium and Dicranum; it typically appears from late August to late November.

The species occurs in temperate to northern boreal zones of southern Scandinavia and Finland (up to about 250 m elevation), where it is not common.
