= Cortinarius fuscobovinaster =

Scientific classification
- Kingdom: Fungi
- Division: Basidiomycota
- Class: Agaricomycetes
- Order: Agaricales
- Family: Cortinariaceae
- Genus: Cortinarius
- Species: C. fuscobovinaster

Binomial name
- Cortinarius fuscobovinaster Kytöv., Liimat., Niskanen & H.Lindstr. (2013)

Species of fungus

Cortinarius fuscobovinaster is an agaric fungus in the family Cortinariaceae, formally described in 2013 based on specimens collected from limestone woodland near Steinkjer, Norway. The species features a greyish-brown cap measuring 2.5–7 centimetres across, moderately spaced gills that transition from pale brown to dark reddish-brown, and a whitish stipe that quickly browns with age. It fruits in early September in coniferous forests on lime-rich soils throughout central and northern Europe's hemiboreal and southern boreal zones, primarily in well-preserved natural forest reserves.

== Taxonomy ==
Cortinarius fuscobovinaster was formally described in 2013 by Ilkka Kytövuori, Tuula Niskanen, and Kare Liimatainen following combined morphological study and DNA sequencing (ITS and rpb2 regions). The epithet fuscobovinaster — from Latin fuscus' ('dark brown') and bovinus ("of C. bovinus") — alludes to both its darker specimens when dried and found in herbaria (dried specimens in Latin: specimina exsiccata) and its close resemblance to Cortinarius bovinidus. The holotype was collected on 5 September 2009 by Kytövuori in a karst (limestone) woodland near Steinkjer, Nord-Trøndelag, Norway. The type collection (Kytövuori 09‑537) was deposited in the herbarium of the University of Helsinki.

== Description ==
The cap (pileus) of C. fuscobovinaster measures 2.5–7 cm across. Initially hemispherical with an inrolled margin, it soon flattens to a low convex or nearly level shape, occasionally bearing a small central bump (umbo). Its surface is covered in fine, innate fibres (fibrillose) and appears greyish‑brown when fresh; as it dries (hygrophanous), streaks of paler, yellowish‑brown appear. The gills are moderately spaced and notch‑attached (emarginate) to the stipe, transitioning from pale brown to dark reddish‑brown, and sometimes darkening further when handled.

The stipe stands 3–13 cm tall and 0.7–1.3 cm thick at the apex (expanding to 1.5–3.0 cm at the base). It is roughly cylindrical to club‑shaped and initially clothed in whitish fibrils that soon brown. Remnants of the universal veil form a woolly band around the mid‑stipe. The fleshis uniform pale greyish‑brown, darkening to near‑black at the stipe base in mature specimens, and gives off no distinctive odour.

Microscopically, spores measure 8.8–10.7 by 5.4–6.3 μm (average 9.4–10.1 by 5.8–6.2 μm). They are narrowly ellipsoid to tear‑shaped (lacrymoid), with a small suprahilar depression (where the spore attaches to the basidium), and bear a dense covering of fine to moderate warts (verrucose ornamentation). In Melzer's reagent these spores stain reddish‑brown (a dextrinoid reaction), a diagnostic chemical response. The central gill tissue (trama) consists of smooth, olive‑tinted hyphae, while the gill edge carries mostly globose to sphaeropedunculate (short‑stalked) cells. The cap cuticle (pileipellis) is a thin layer of pale brownish hyphae, largely smooth but sometimes showing fine, zebra‑striped pigment encrustations; a distinct layer of almost colourless cells (hypoderm) lies beneath. Clamp connections (hook‑like bridges between adjacent hyphal cells) are present throughout the mushroom's tissues.

== Habitat and distribution ==
Cortinarius fuscobovinaster fruits in early September in mesic to dryish coniferous forests on calcareous (lime‑rich) soils. It has been found in mature spruce‑dominated stands, mixed pine–spruce woodlands, and even on exposed limestone ridges. All known records lie within the hemiboreal and southern borealzones of central and northern Europe, where the species remains rare and mostly confined to well‑preserved natural forest reserves.

== See also ==
- List of Cortinarius species
