= Clitocybe menthiodora =

Scientific classification
- Kingdom: Fungi
- Division: Basidiomycota
- Class: Agaricomycetes
- Order: Agaricales
- Family: Clitocybaceae
- Genus: Clitocybe
- Species: C. menthiodora

Binomial name
- Clitocybe menthiodora Harmaja (1969)

Species of mushroom-forming fungus

Clitocybe menthiodora is a species of mushroom-forming fungus first described by the Finnish mycologist Harri Harmaja in 1969. It is characterized by its dingy brown, hygrophanous cap, white spore print, and distinctive menthol-like odour in dried specimens, for which it is named. This uncommon saprotrophic fungus grows on various types of forest litter, including coniferous and deciduous trees, as well as on bare calcareous soil or among mosses. The species occurs from temperate to middle boreal zones in Finland and Norway, fruiting from late August to late November.

== Taxonomy ==
Clitocybe menthiodora was formally described by the Finnish mycologist Harri Harmaja in 1969. The holotype was collected on 19 September 1967 in a former pasture‑land at Mustiala, Tammela, in the province of Southern Finland; an isotype (duplicate) is preserved at the herbarium of the University of Michigan. Dry fruitbodies have an odour similar to menthol, a feature for which the fungus is named.

== Description ==
The cap (pileus is 3–6 cm broad, hygrophanous (changing shade as it loses moisture), non‑pruinose (not frosty), and shows fine translucent striations at the margin. When fresh it is a dingy brown, fading in dried herbarium specimens (Latin: specimina exsiccata) to a pale brown or yellow‑brown; the disc is always slightly darker than the margin. The cap is convex at first, becoming plane or broadly depressed, sometimes shallowly bowl‑shaped, with the margin initially incurved then straight or slightly incurved. Its surface is dry, faintly lustrous and smooth, developing conspicuous concentric wrinkles when dried.

The stipe measures 4–5 cm by 4–10 mm, and is concolorous with or slightly darker than the cap, especially toward the base. It is solid at first, later hollowing, cyclindircal (terete) or somewhat compressed, tapering little or not at all. The surface is dry and glabrous (smooth and hairless), sometimes with a very thin fibrillose (hair‑like) coating near the apex and scanty tomentum or rhizoids at the base.

The lamellae are short‑decurrent to narrowly adnate, attaching at an angle of about 60–90°. They occur in three to four tiers, with roughly 40 reaching the stipe, about 3 mm broad at mid‑length—four times broader than the underlying flesh—and are dirty pale brown when moist, deepening to pale fuscous in dried specimens. They are not forked and only weakly anastomose.

The odour is weakly to distinctly farinaceous (reminiscent of flour) in young fruit bodies, becoming very agreeable on drying; in herbarium specimens it may develop a faint fishy note. The taste is mild, often faintly farinaceous in youth, turning simply fungoid with age.

Microscopically, the spores measure 5.0–8.0 by 2.8–3.7 micrometre (μm), are obtuse at the base, mostly ovate with some oblong forms, and bear irregular oil droplets (guttules); the apiculus is about 0.5–0.7 by 0.3–0.4 μm. The spore deposit is pure white.

The cap cuticle (pileipellis) is 25–40 μm thick, comprising parallel hyphae 3.5–8.5 μm wide with rich membranal pigment; a distinct subcutis is not differentiated.

== Habitat and distribution ==
Clitocybe menthiodora is saprotrophic, fruiting mostly in small groups or loose arcs in coniferous and mixed coniferous–deciduous grass‑herb forests, and occasionally in mesic or dry heath. It grows on litter of spruce, Scots pine, Siberian larch, lodgepole pine, eastern white pine, grey alder, birch, hazel, poplar, wych elm and lime, as well as on bare calcareous soil or among mosses. Fruiting occurs from late August to late November. The species is known from temperate to middle boreal zones of eastern Finland up to about 200 m elevation and is considered uncommon. In 1995, it was recorded for the first time in Norway.
