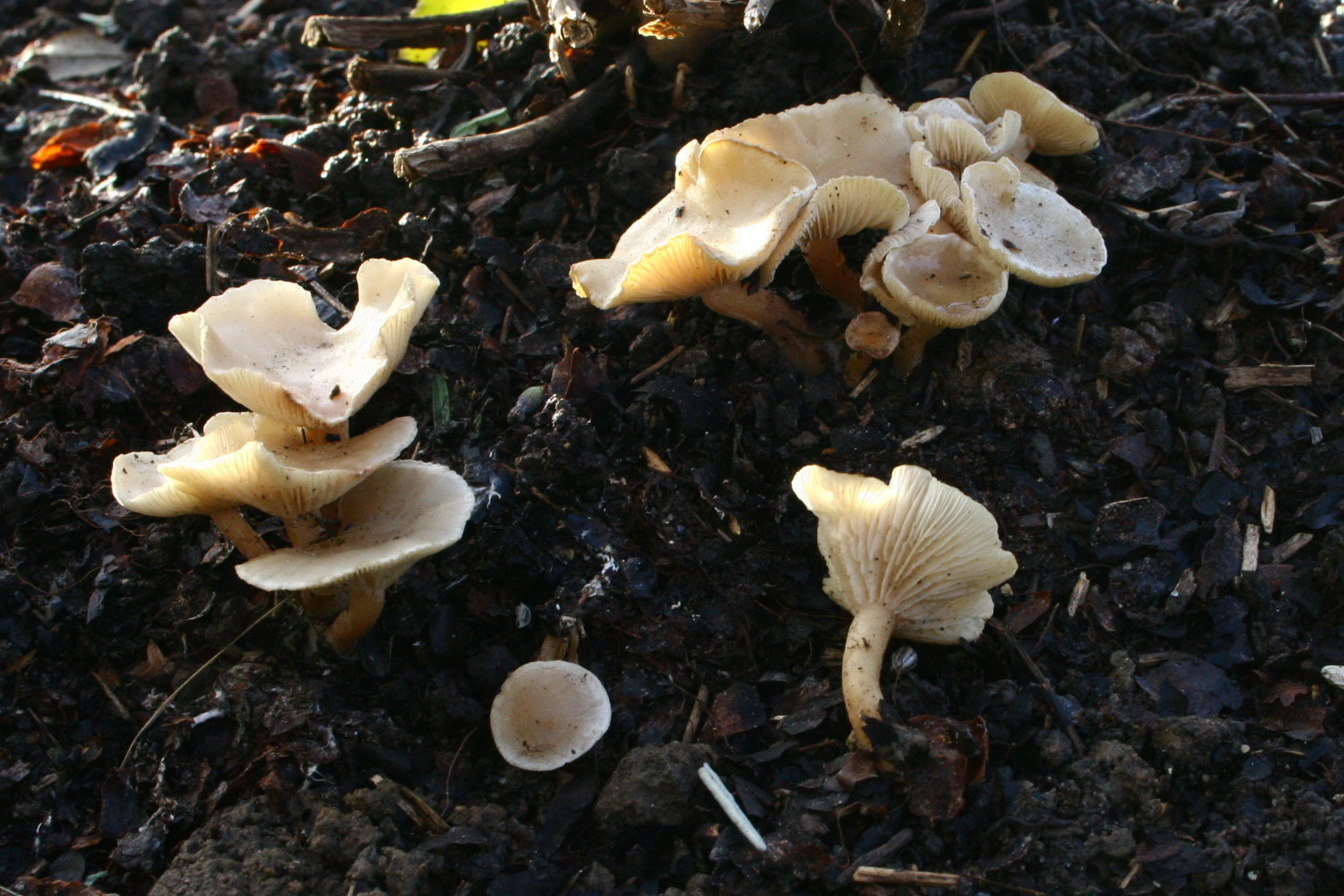

Scientific classification
- Domain: Eukaryota
- Kingdom: Fungi
- Division: Basidiomycota
- Class: Agaricomycetes
- Order: Agaricales
- Family: Clitocybaceae
- Genus: Clitocybe
- Species: C. agrestis

Binomial name
- Clitocybe agrestis Harmaja (1969)

= Clitocybe agrestis =

Species of mushroom-forming fungus

Clitocybe agrestis is a species of agaric fungus. Widely distributed in Europe, it was described as new to science in 1969 by the Finnish mycologist Harri Harmaja. Fruitbodies are poisonous as they contain the toxin muscarine.

== Taxonomy ==
Clitocybe agrestis was formally described by the Finnish mycologist Harri Harmaja in 1969. The holotype was collected on 11 October 1968 along a roadside near Läby in Uppland, Sweden; an isotype (duplicate) is preserved at the herbarium of the University of Michigan. The species epithet agrestis means "of fields".

== Description ==
The cap (pileus measures 2–5 cm across and is hygrophanous—that is, it changes shade as it dries—and translucent‑striate up to halfway from the margin to the disc. When moist the cap is various shades of beige, with a slightly paler, bent‑down margin; in dried specimens it becomes a dull, dirty brown. Young caps are slightly convex, flattening to plane and eventually developing a shallow central depression.

The stipe is 2–4 cm long and 2–5 mm thick, typically matching the cap in colour or a touch paler. It tapers little or not at all, remains solid for some time before hollowing out, and bears a sparse whitish tomentum and occasional rhizoids at the base. The surface is dry, matt and smooth.

The lamellae are obliquely adnate to faintly decurrent, forming an angle of 35–60°. They occur in three tiers, about 30 reach the stipe, and are often triangular, broadest (4–5 mm) near the stipe and narrowing towards the edge. When fresh they are whitish to faintly brownish; in dried specimens they acquire dirty brown tones similar to the cap and stipe. The smell is faintly fruity—often likened to strawberries—and becomes more pronounced as the fruit bodies dry. The taste is mild and fungoid.

Microscopically, the spores measure 4.5–5.8 by 2.9–3.3 μm, are broadly ellipsoid to oblong with an obtuse base, and often occur in tetrads; the apiculus is about 0.6–0.7 by 0.3–0.4 μm. The spore print is pinkish‑buff. The cap cuticle (epicutis) is 60–100 μm thick, comprising subparallel to interwoven hyphae 1.5–4.5 μm wide with faint intracellular pigment; the underlying subcutis is not clearly differentiated.

== Habitat and distribution ==
C. agrestis is saprotrophic fruiting gregariously to in small tufts in man‑made open habitats such as stubble fields (oats, rye), pastures and roadsides, always on bare, nutrient‑rich soil. It may occur among grasses, herbs or mosses like Ceratodon purpureus and Brachythecium albicans. Fruiting bodies appear from mid‑August to early November. The species is known from hemiboreal to middle boreal zones of southern Sweden and Finland, up to about 250 m elevation, but is generally regarded as rare.
