= Clitocybe globispora =

Scientific classification
- Kingdom: Fungi
- Division: Basidiomycota
- Class: Agaricomycetes
- Order: Agaricales
- Family: Clitocybaceae
- Genus: Clitocybe
- Species: C. globispora

Binomial name
- Clitocybe globispora Harmaja (1969)

Species of mushroom-forming fungus

Clitocybe globispora is a rare mushroom-forming fungus first described by the Finnish mycologist Harri Harmaja in 1969. It is characterized by its irregularly globose (spherical) spores and distinctive rust-brown gills when dried. Found primarily in spruce forests of Finland and more recently in Italy, this saprotrophic species grows on spruce litter in mesic heath and mixed forest environments.

== Taxonomy ==
Clitocybe globispora was described by the Finnish mycologist Harri Harmaja in 1969. The holotype was collected by Petter Adolf Karsten on 21 August 1889 in a spruce stand near Syrjä in Tammela, Southern Finland; it is preserved in the P.A. Karsten Herbarium.

== Description ==
Fruit bodies of Clitocybe globispora resemble those of C. subcordispora but can be told apart by the spores, which are irregularly globose (spherical) rather than sub‑cordiform (somewhat heart-shaped). In dried specimens the gills turn a distinctive rust‑brown. Microscopically, the basidiospores measure 3.2–5.0 μm in diameter, are obtuse at the base and more or less globose, and contain several minute oil droplets (guttules), occasionally with a single larger droplet; the apiculus is about 0.6–0.9 by 0.4–0.6 μm. The spore deposit colour was not recorded.

Under the microscope the cap cuticle (epicutis) is almost colourless, 25–40 μm thick, with hyphae 1.5–3.5 μm wide that are parallel to lightly interwoven and bear only scant intracellular pigment. Beneath this layer the subcutis forms a darker band 25–50 μm thick, composed of hyphae 2.0–6.0 μm wide with abundant membrane‑bound pigment.

Odour and taste were not recorded, but the dried specimens suggest affinities with other rust‑gilled Clitocybe species.

== Habitat and distribution ==
C. globispora is saprotrophic, occurring in mesic heath and mixed spruce forests, always on litter of spruce. Fruiting has been observed in the latter half of August. At the time of its original publication, the species was known only from hemiboreal to southern boreal zones of eastern Finland, up to about 100 m elevation, and is considered very rare. In 2018, it was recorded from South Tyrol in Italy.
