= Clitocybe lohjaensis =

Scientific classification
- Kingdom: Fungi
- Division: Basidiomycota
- Class: Agaricomycetes
- Order: Agaricales
- Family: Clitocybaceae
- Genus: Clitocybe
- Species: C. lohjaensis

Binomial name
- Clitocybe lohjaensis Harmaja (1969)

Species of mushroom-forming fungus

Clitocybe lohjaensis is an uncommon species of mushroom-forming fungus. Found in northern Europe, it was described as new to science in 1969 by Finnish mycologist Harri Harmaja. Lohja, for which the species is named, is a town in southern Finland.

== Taxonomy ==
Clitocybe lohjaënsis was formally described by Harri Harmaja in 1969. The holotype was collected on 15 October 1965 in a grass–herb forest litter under spruce at Jalassaari, rural district of Lohja, Southwest Finland, by Harmaja; an isotype (duplicate) is preserved in the herbarium of the University of Michigan. The species epithet lohjaënsis alludes to the type locality.

== Description ==
The cap (cap is 1.5–6 cm broad, hygrophanous (changing shade as it dries), non‑pruinose and distinctly translucent‑striate up to two‑thirds of the radius. When moist it is pale brown to slightly grey‑tinted; in dried specimens it fades to pale or greyish brown. The disc is usually a shade darker. The cap is convex at first, later plane, then umbilicate or bowl‑shaped; the margin is incurved initially, becoming more or less straight. The surface is dry but slightly slippery, subtly lustrous and smooth, and in dried herbarium specimens (Latin: specimina exsiccata) shows conspicuous concentric wrinkles.

The stipe measures 2–9 cm by 3–10 mm, the same colour as or a little paler than the cap. It is equal or slightly attenuated at the base, solid at first and later hollowing, initially cylindrical (terete) then somewhat compressed. The surface is smooth and mostly glabrous (smooth and hairless), sometimes bearing fine fibrillose hyphae at the apex and a few to several thin rhizoids at the base.

The lamellae are short‑decurrent (attachment angle c. 35–50°), occurring in three tiers of about 40–50 reaching the stipe. They measure 3–5 mm broad at mid‑length and are dirty brownish when fresh, becoming slightly paler with age; they may anastomose weakly. The odour of the mushroom is farinaceous (mealy) in young fruit bodies, later turning fungoid; the taste is mild and fungoid.

Microscopically, the spores measure 4.2–6.0 by 3.0–3.6 micrometres (μm), are obtuse at the base, mostly ovate with a few oblong, and contain indistinct guttules (oil droplets); the apiculus is about 0.5–0.7 by 0.3–0.4 μm. The spore deposit is white. Under the microscope, the cap cuticle (pileipellis) is almost colourless, 40–90 μm thick, with parallel hyphae 3.5–8.5 μm wide bearing rich membranal pigment.

== Habitat and distribution ==
Clitocybe lohjaënsis is saprotrophic, fruiting mostly in groups or arcs, occasionally solitarily, in coniferous or mixed coniferous–deciduous grass–herb forests. It grows on litter of spruce, also under poplar, Siberian larch, Scots pine, lodgepole pine, eastern white pine, grey alder, birch, hazel, wych elm, lime, and occasionally on bare calcareous soil or among mosses. Fruiting occurs from late August to late November.

The species is known from temperate to southern boreal zones of the northern boreal region in eastern Finland, up to about 250 m elevation, and is considered uncommon. In 1978, Harmaja reported the species from Kuusamo, northern Finland.
