= Cortinarius bovinaster =

Scientific classification
- Kingdom: Fungi
- Division: Basidiomycota
- Class: Agaricomycetes
- Order: Agaricales
- Family: Cortinariaceae
- Genus: Cortinarius
- Species: C. bovinaster

Binomial name
- Cortinarius bovinaster Niskanen, Kytöv. & Liimat. (2013)

Species of fungus

Cortinarius bovinaster is an rare agaric fungus in the family Cortinariaceae. Described as a new species in 2013, it is only found in boreal and hemiboreal zones of Finland and Sweden. It is classified in section Bovini of the genus Cortinarius.

== Description ==
Cortinarius bovinaster produces a slender fruit body with a cap 1.5–8 cm across. When young, the cap is broadly conical to hemispherical and matures to a low, flattened dome often marked by a shallow central bump (umbo. Its surface is clothed in fine fibres (fibrillose) and appears brown to grey‑brown when moist, fading to a pale yellowish‑brown as it dries (hygrophanous). The gills beneath the cap are spaced moderately to rather distantly and feature a slight notch where they join the stipe (emarginate attachment); they start pale yellowish‑brown and darken to deep brown as spores develop. The stipe itself reaches 3.5–9 cm in height and is up to 1 cm thick at the top, tapering only slightly towards a broader base. It is initially covered in whitish fibrils that soon turn greyish‑brown with handling. Traces of the universal veil may persist as a delicate, whitish sheath or ring low on the stipe. The flesh is uniformly pale grey‑brown, becoming darker towards the base, and yields no distinctive odour when cut.

Under the microscope, the spores measure 8.8–10.7 by 5.4–6.3 μm (average 9.2–9.9 by 5.7–6.0 μm) and are narrowly ellipsoid to tear‑shaped. Their surface bears fine, densely packed warts (verrucose ornamentation), and they stain a reddish‑brown in Melzer's reagent (dextrinoid reaction), reflecting their characteristic wall chemistry. The gill tissue (trama) is composed of hyphae that are smooth to very slightly roughened, while the cap cuticle (pileipellis) consists of thin‑walled hyphae—mostly smooth but occasionally showing fine scabrous patches. Clamp connections (small hook‑like bridges between hyphal cells) are present throughout the mushroom's tissues, a feature typical of this group.

== Habitat and distribution ==
Cortinarius bovinaster fruits from mid‑August to early September in mesic to fairly damp coniferous woodlands (comprising principally Picea abies or Pinus sylvestris) on calcareous soils. It is known to occur in the boreal and hemiboreal zones of Finland and Sweden, where it is rare. In the 2019 Finnish red list, Cortinarius bovinaster is considered a near-threatened species, unchanged from its 2010 classification.

== See also ==
- List of Cortinarius species
