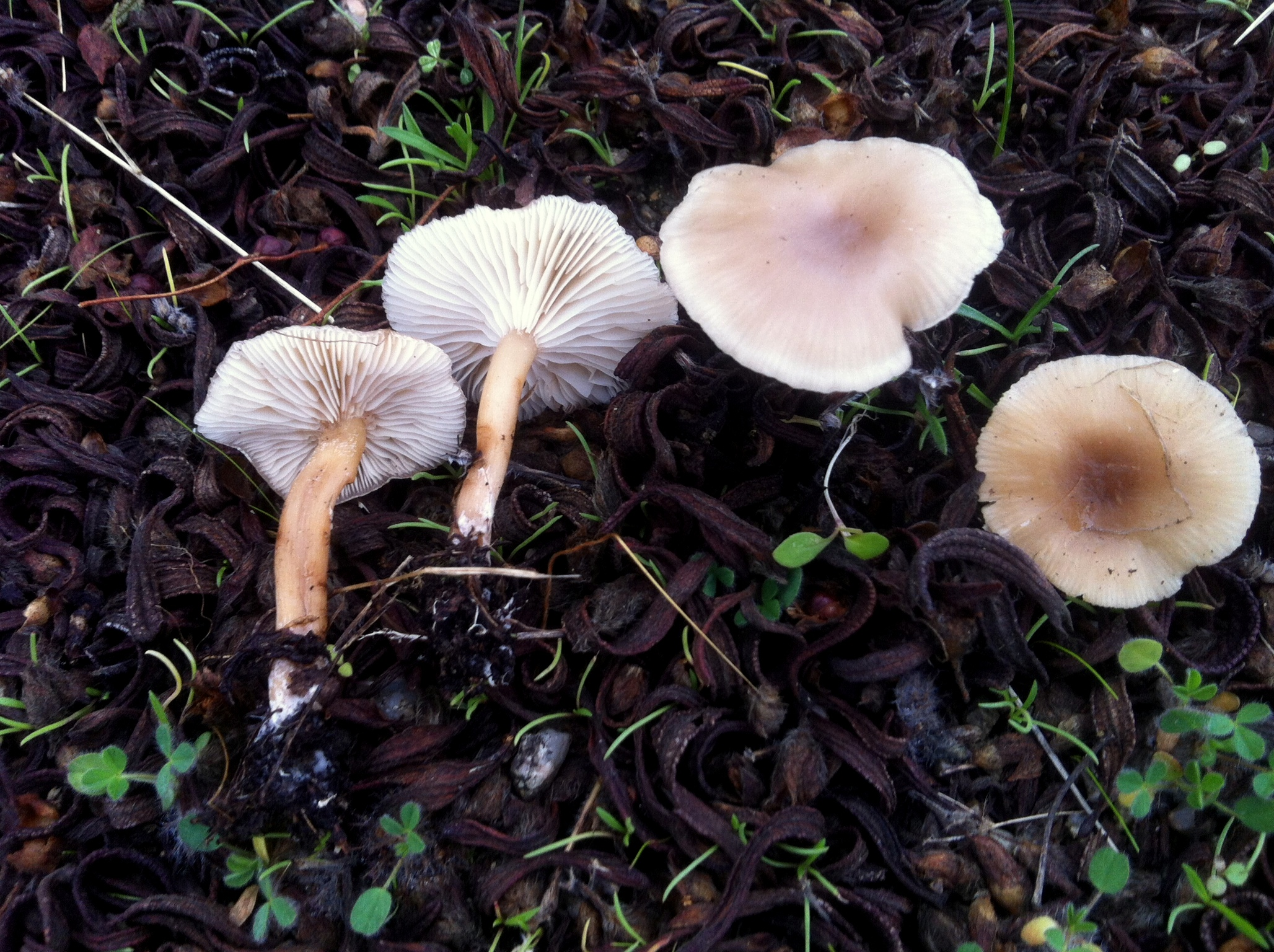

Scientific classification
- Kingdom: Fungi
- Division: Basidiomycota
- Class: Agaricomycetes
- Order: Agaricales
- Family: Clitocybaceae
- Genus: Clitocybe
- Species: C. cistophila

Binomial name
- Clitocybe cistophila Bon & Contu (1985)

= Clitocybe cistophila =

Species of mushroom-forming fungus

Clitocybe cistophila is a species of agaric fungus in the family Clitocybaceae, formally described in 1985 based on collections from Sardinia, Italy. The fungus produces small fruiting bodies with milk-white to cream caps that become funnel-shaped with age, and emit a distinctive anise odour when fresh. It grows exclusively in maquis shrubland habitats on sandy, acidic soils beneath rockrose shrubs (Cistus species), particularly in association with holm oak, maritime pine, myrtle, and bay laurel. Initially known only from southern Sardinia, the species has since been found in Tuscany and Calabria, suggesting a wider western Mediterranean distribution.

== Taxonomy ==
Bon & Contu's 1985 protologue in Documents Mycologiques defined C. cistophila on the grounds of its anise odour, pileus pruina and microscopic characters, assigning it to section Epruinatae, subsection Fragrantes. The epithet cistophila, meaning "Cistus‑loving", alludes to its strict association with shrubs of the genus Cistus. Later, Quadraccia and Lunghini (1990) proposed section Candicantes in light of its non‑cyanophilous spores and pruina without marked hygrophanous reaction, while Contu (1993) reassigned it to subsection Fritilliformes of section Pseudolyophyllum, noting that its combination of macroscopic and microscopic features bridges multiple infrageneric groups.

== Description ==
The caps of Clitocybe cistophila are 1.0–2.5 cm in diameter, beginning plane or convex before developing a shallow central depression or mature funnel‑shape (infundibuliform), often with a subtle umbo; their surface is silky‑glabrous, milk‑white to cream, and distinctly hygrophanous, revealing fine radial striations at the margin when moist. Gills (lamella) are moderately crowded, adnate to somewhat decurrent with a slight decurrent tooth, and bruise pale pink when handled. The stipe measures 2.0–4.0 by 0.3–0.6 cm, is cylindrical to slightly clubbed, longitudinally fibrillose, pruinose when young and later smooth, bearing a basal white tomentum; the flesh is firm yet elastic and may bruise pale brown in the stipe cortex. The lamellar trama consists of parallel to slightly undulating hyphae with abundant clamp connections, while cheilocystidia are absent.

== Habitat and distribution ==
Clitocybe cistophila fruits in spring and autumn in Mediterranean maquis on sandy, acidic soils beneath rockrose shrubs—especially Cistus monspeliensis and Cistus salviifolius—often in association with Quercus ilex, Pinus pinaster, Myrtus communis, and Laurus nobilis. Initially only known from southern Sardinia at sea level, it was later collected in 2013 at Castiglione della Pescaia (Grosseto, Tuscany) and reported from southern Calabria, indicating a wider western Mediterranean distribution; colonies of 30–50 fruiting bodies can occur at single sites.

== Similar species ==
This species may be confused with Clitocybe albofragans, which differs by its pure white, non‑hygrophanous cap, distinctly striate margin and pinkish spore printed mass, in contrast to the hygrophanous translucence, smooth margin and non‑cyanophilous white spores of C. cistophila.
