= Clitocybe ruderalis =

Scientific classification
- Domain: Eukaryota
- Kingdom: Fungi
- Division: Basidiomycota
- Class: Agaricomycetes
- Order: Agaricales
- Family: Clitocybaceae
- Genus: Clitocybe
- Species: C. ruderalis

Binomial name
- Clitocybe ruderalis Harmaja (1969)

Species of mushroom-forming fungus

Clitocybe ruderalis is a rare species of mushroom-forming fungus formally described by the Finnish mycologist Harri Harmaja in 1966. The fungus produces fruit bodies that resemble the ivory funnel mushroom (Clitocybe dealbata) but can be distinguished by their narrower, more descending gills and slightly broader spores. It grows as a decomposer on bare, fertile soil in refuse heaps, often in association with the moss Ceratodon purpureus. At the time of its original description, the species was known only from eastern Finland in the hemiboreal zone near sea level, with the type specimen collected from a rubbish dump in Pasila, Helsinki.

== Taxonomy ==
Clitocybe ruderalis was formally described by the Finnish mycologist Harri Harmaja in 1966. The holotype was gathered on 18 September 1966 at a rubbish dump in Pasila, Helsinki (province of Uusimaa). An isotype (duplicate) is preserved at the herbarium of the University of Michigan Herbarium.

== Description ==
The fruit bodies (basidiocarps) of C. ruderalis resemble those of the ivory funnel (Clitocybe dealbata), but can be told apart by their narrower, more decurrent gills and slightly broader spores. The gills (lamella are slender and descend a little way down the stipe.

Microscopically, the spores measure 4.0–6.0 by 2.9–3.7 micrometre (μm); they are broadly elliptical to somewhat oblong, obtuse at one end and often contain irregular oil droplets. The apiculus (spore attachment point) is about 0.5–0.7 by 0.4–0.5 μm.

The cap cuticle (epicutis) is 50–80 μm thick and consists of more‑or‑less parallel hyphae 2.0–6.5 μm wide, with faint intracellular pigment and conspicuous encrusted crystals. Beneath this layer, the subcutis is not clearly differentiated.

== Habitat and distribution ==
This species is saprotrophic, growing on bare, fertile soil in refuse heaps. It is often found in company with the moss Ceratodon purpureus. Fruiting bodies have been recorded in mid‑September. At the time of its original publication, C. ruderalis was known only from the hemiboreal zone of eastern Finland at near sea level. The fungus is considered rare; a survey of mushroom species on the Estonian island Osmussaar, carried out in 1976, was the last time the species has been reported from that locality despite later surveys.
