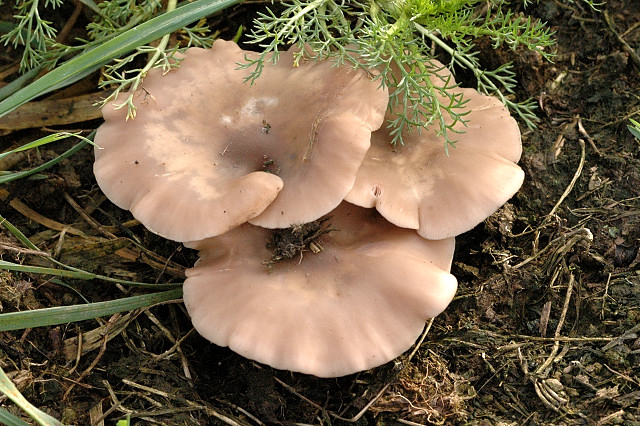
- Clitocybe amarescens from Commanster, Belgium

Scientific classification
- Kingdom: Fungi
- Division: Basidiomycota
- Class: Agaricomycetes
- Order: Agaricales
- Family: Clitocybaceae
- Genus: Clitocybe
- Species: C. amarescens

Binomial name
- Clitocybe amarescens Harmaja (1969)

Synonyms
- Lepista amarescens (Harmaja) Harmaja (1976); Clitocybe nitrophila Bon (1979); Clitocybe amarescens var. nitrophila (Bon) E.Ludw. (2012)

= Clitocybe amarescens =

Species of fungus

Clitocybe amarescens
- Mycological characteristics
- Gills on hymenium
- Cap is convex or depressed
- Hymenium is decurrent
- Stipe is bare
- Spore print is buff to cream
- Edibility is unknown

Clitocybe amarescens is a species of agaric fungus in the family Clitocybaceae. Widely distributed in northwestern Europe, it was first described in 1969 by Finnish mycologist Harri Harmaja. It fruits in groups or in fairy rings in grasslands. Amarescens signifies "tending to bitterness".

== Description ==
The cap of this mushroom measures 3-6 cm across, and is hygrophanous, coloured grey-brown when moist, and pale brown when dry. Initially, the shape is convex with an inrolled margin, though it flattens out and becomes depressed with age. In young specimens, the cap is darker and can have a powdery appearance (pruinescence), though its surface is smooth.

The stipe is a similar colour to the cap when moist, though darker when dry and is solid at first, though it becomes hollow with age. It is cylindrical, and its base is covered in densely matted hairs (tomentum), though rarely, it also has inconspicuous rhizoids too.

The gills are moderately decurrent, attached to the stipe at a 15-45° angle. They are pale brown when moist, though when dry, more or less the same colour as the cap. They are crowded and thickest in the middle, and occasionally forked at the stipe.

The odour of the mushroom is "mushroom-like" though the older specimens can smell reminiscent of Cystoderma carcharias. The caps of adult specimens taste slightly bitter, though their stipes and younger specimens taste mushroom-like.

=== Microscopic details ===
The spores measure 6.4 -9.4 x 3.1-4.8 μm. they are congophilus and cyanophilous. They have an obtuse base, and range from elliptical to oblong in shape. The spores contain one large and a couple smaller guttules. The spore print is pale yellow to cream. The apiculus (part of spore which attaches to the sterigmata) measures 0.6-0.9 x 0.5-0. 6 μm. The basidia usually have 4 spores each, but sometimes, they only have 2.

The epicutis of the cap is 40-80 μm thick. Cheilocystidia are absent. Clamp connections are present in all tissue.

== Ecology ==
In southwest Finnland, Clitocybe amarescens grows in rows, groups or clusters in moist or occasionally dry coniferous heath forests. They grow in Picea needle litter and sometimes in heaps of straw. They are often found alongside Pleurozium or Hylocomium mosses. They grow throughout October in the eastern areas of southwest Finland. They are common throughout northwest Europe, where they grow from September to January, and additionally in nutrient rich grasslands.

== Similar Species ==
C. metachroa has a less infundibuliform and striped cap, and paler gills as well as having a different ecology. Clitocybe stercoraria has a greenish grey tint instead of brown.

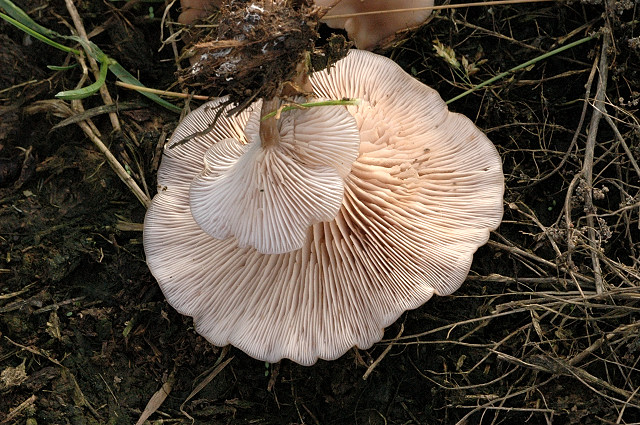
Underside
