= Clitocybe paraditopa =

Scientific classification
- Domain: Eukaryota
- Kingdom: Fungi
- Division: Basidiomycota
- Class: Agaricomycetes
- Order: Agaricales
- Family: Clitocybaceae
- Genus: Clitocybe
- Species: C. paraditopa

Binomial name
- Clitocybe paraditopa Cleland & Cheel (1919)

Species of fungus

Clitocybe paraditopa is a fungus of the genus Clitocybe. Found in Australia, it was described in 1919 by naturalists John Burton Cleland and Edwin Cheel. Fruitbodies of the fungus smell strongly of blossoms of the golden wattle (Acacia pycnantha) and sweet wattle (Acacia suaveolens). From the original description of specimens that had been found in New South Wales and South Australia, the describers suggested that it was similar in appearance to Clitocybe subditopa and thus could be called paraditopa, "comparable to [C.] ditopa".
