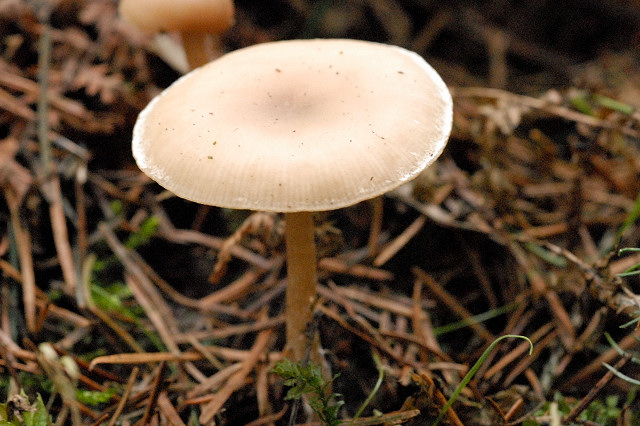

Scientific classification
- Domain: Eukaryota
- Kingdom: Fungi
- Division: Basidiomycota
- Class: Agaricomycetes
- Order: Agaricales
- Family: Clitocybaceae
- Genus: Clitocybe
- Species: C. vibecina

Binomial name
- Clitocybe vibecina (Fr.) Quél. 1872

= Clitocybe vibecina =

Species of fungus

Clitocybe vibecina is a common, inedible mushroom of the genus Clitocybe. It often grows in rings on needle litter, usually late in the year.

== Description ==
The cap is umbilicated with a down turned margin, rarely funnel shaped. When moist, it is dark grey with a brownish grey center, striped and whitish grey when dry. it grows up to 5 cm in diameter. The gills are grey, rather thick and a little decurrent. The spores are white. The stem is grey to white. The flesh is watery, grey and has a rancid smell. The Latin vibicina means "with weals or welts (vibices)" and would seem to describe the slightly raised striations of the cap.

== Similar species ==
Clitocybe ditopus is larger, with a grey cap when moist and white when dry. The ribs are absent.

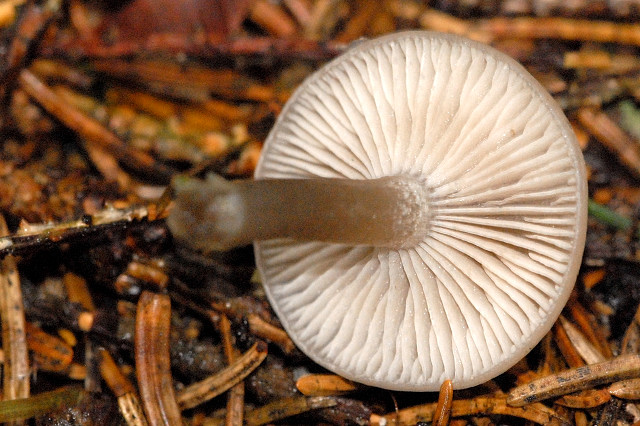
The underside of the mushroom

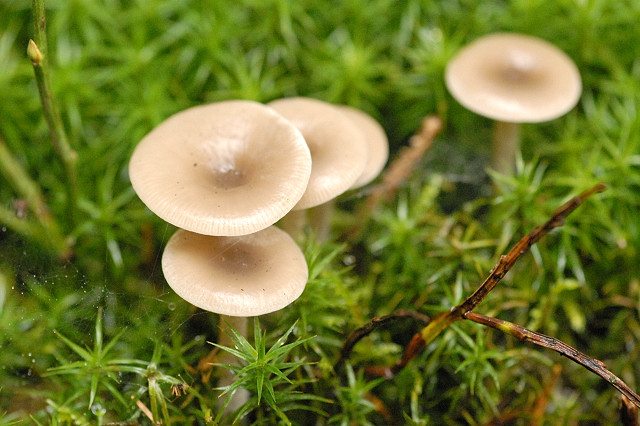
Clitocybe vibecina mushrooms in a group
