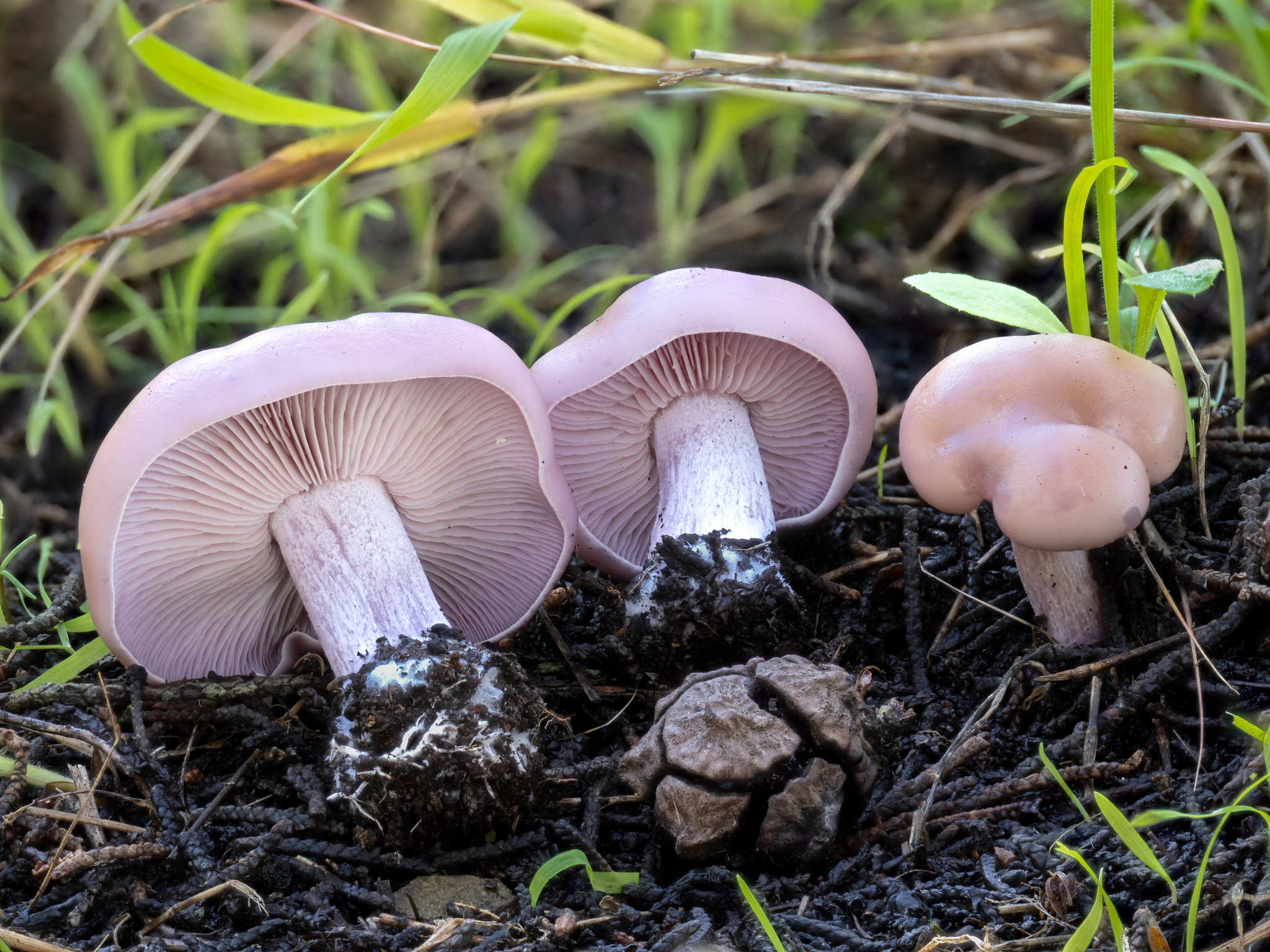
- Contra Costa County, California, 2024

Scientific classification
- Kingdom: Fungi
- Division: Basidiomycota
- Class: Agaricomycetes
- Order: Agaricales
- Family: Clitocybaceae
- Genus: Clitocybe
- Species: C. violaceifolia

Binomial name
- Clitocybe violaceifolia Murrill, 1913

= Clitocybe violaceifolia =

Western cypress blewit

Species of fungus

Clitocybe violaceifolia
- Mycological characteristics
- Gills on hymenium
- Cap is convex
- Hymenium is adnexed
- Stipe is bare
- Edibility is edible, but unpalatable

Clitocybe violaceifolia, also known as the western cypress blewit, is a species of gilled mushroom native to western North America. C. violaceifolia can be distinguished from its choice-edible cousin, the wood blewit, by its association with trees in the cypress family. According to California mycologist Alan Rockefeller, C. violaceifolia "smells like mud". These mushrooms are theoretically edible but are reportedly quite unpalatable.

This species was first described by William A. Murrill in 1913 from a type species collected near Salem, Oregon by Morton E. Peck. Murrill's description was "Pileus convex, somewhat gibbous, solitary, 3 cm. broad; surface slightly viscid when moist, smooth, glabrous, grayish-violet tinted with brown at the center, margin entire, slightly paler; lamellae very narrow, adnexed to slightly decurrent, rather crowded, arcuate, pale-violet; spores ellipsoid, smooth, hyaline, 7-8 X 3.5-4.5; stipe equal, fleshy, solid, smooth, glabrous, grayish-violet, mycelioid at the base, 3 cm. long, 6 mm. thick."

The western cypress blewit has been documented in Oregon, California, and Arizona.
