= Clitocybe parasitica =

Scientific classification
- Domain: Eukaryota
- Kingdom: Fungi
- Division: Basidiomycota
- Class: Agaricomycetes
- Order: Agaricales
- Family: Clitocybaceae
- Genus: Clitocybe
- Species: C. parasitica

Binomial name
- Clitocybe parasitica Wilcox

Species of fungus

Clitocybe parasitica is classified as a plant pathogen, because in the United States it causes Clitocybe Root Rot, affecting apple, peach, cherry, and oak species. First detected in Oklahoma in 1900 and described by E.M. Wilcox the following year, C. parasitica has been found afflicting orchard trees as far north as Oregon.
