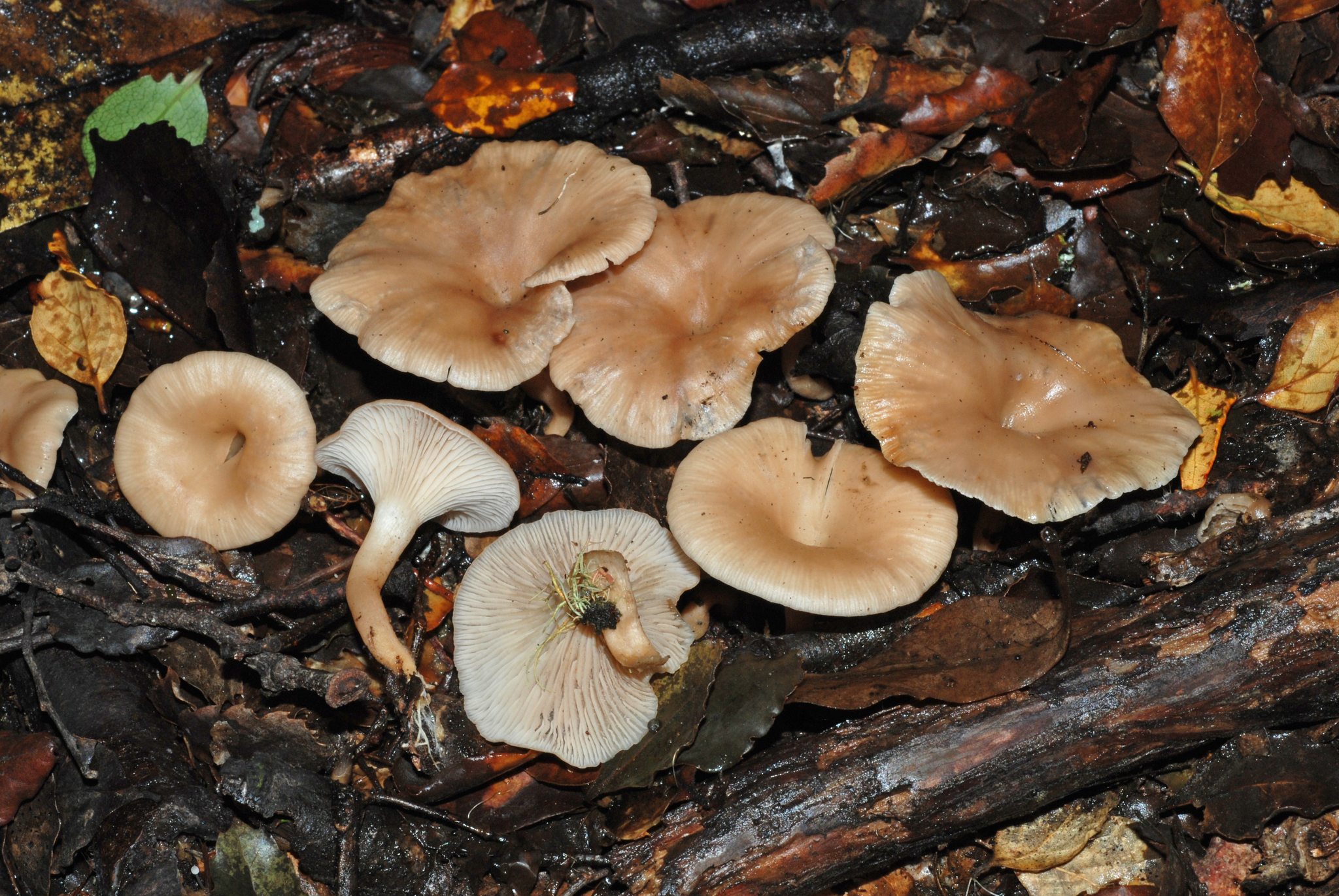
- At Hatepe, Te Heuheu Road, New Zealand

Scientific classification
- Kingdom: Fungi
- Division: Basidiomycota
- Class: Agaricomycetes
- Order: Agaricales
- Family: Clitocybaceae
- Genus: Singerocybe
- Species: S. clitocyboides

Binomial name
- Singerocybe clitocyboides (Cooke & Massee) Zhu L. Yang, J. Qin & G.M. Gates (2014)

= Singerocybe clitocyboides =

Species of fungus

Singerocybe clitocyboides is a species of fungus in the genus Singerocybe. It is endemic to Australia and New Zealand.

== Taxonomy ==
The species was described in 1887 by Cooke and Massee as Agaricus clitocyboides. The holotype specimen was collected from Gippsland, Victoria Australia. In 2014, A. clitocyboides was moved to the genus Singerocybe by Zhu, Yang and Gates as Singerocybe clitocyboides (Cooke & Massee) Zhu L. Yang, J. Qin & G.M. Gates, comb. nov.

== Description ==
The pileus ranges from 25 to 50 mm (0.98 to 1.97 in) in diameter, that is convex depressed in shape.The pileus is a pale yellow to orange colour that is glabrous and smooth, that occasionally is tinged with red.

The stipe is 35–50 mm (1.4–2.0 in) in length and 50–75 mm (2.0–3.0 in) in width, it is centrally attached. It is curved and subclavate in shape, with a pale whitish colour. The stipe has a solid structure with no chambers located within it.

The lamellae are crowded and thin, that are structured in a collarium that are a broad white colour. The spores of Singerocybe clitocyboides are elliptic/ellipsoid in shape and have a size of 5 x 2u.

== Habitat & distribution ==
Singerocybe clitocyboides occurs in forest and has been identified in the North Island of New Zealand and the territories of Victoria, New South Wales and Southern Australia, Australia. It has been identified on rotting woods such as old fern logs and on the ground of lowland podocarp, broad-leaved forests.
