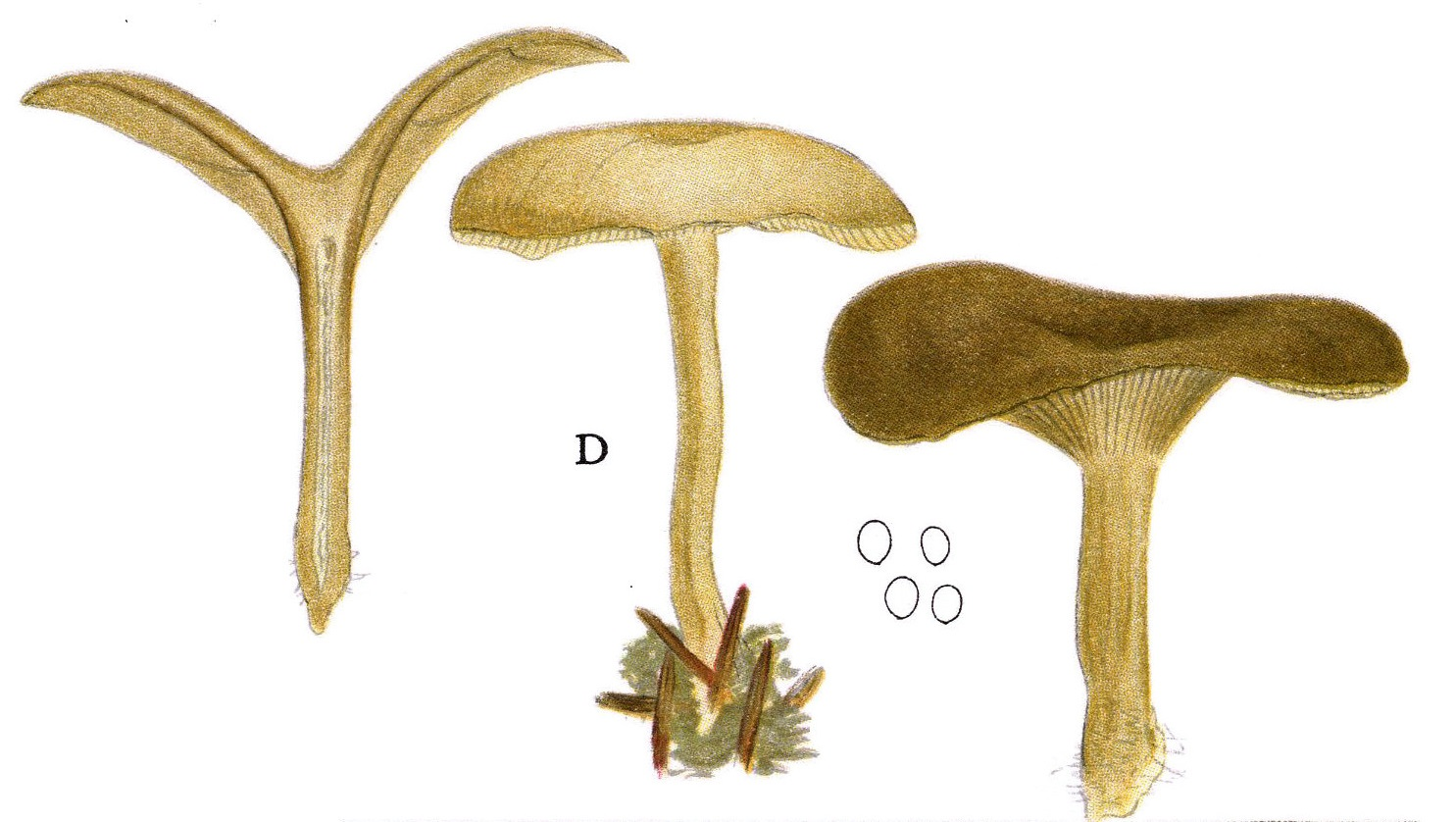

Scientific classification
- Domain: Eukaryota
- Kingdom: Fungi
- Division: Basidiomycota
- Class: Agaricomycetes
- Order: Agaricales
- Family: Clitocybaceae
- Genus: Clitocybe
- Species: C. brumalis

Binomial name
- Clitocybe brumalis (Fr.) Quél. 1872

= Clitocybe brumalis =

Species of fungus

Clitocybe brumalis, commonly known as the winter funnel cap, brumalis signifying "wintry", is an inedible mushroom of the genus Clitocybe. It grows in deciduous and coniferous woodland, only in winter; sometimes even under snow.

== Description ==
The cap is convex or umbilicate when young, soon funnel-shaped. Pale when moist, with a weakly translucent and striped margin, almost white when dry, it grows up to 5 cm in diameter. The gills are dirty white, crowded and a little decurrent. The spores are also white. The stem is pale brown, striped and soon hollow, with a white, felty base. The flesh is dirty brown.

== Similar species ==
Several species growing in autumn look very similar and are difficult to distinguish without a microscope.
