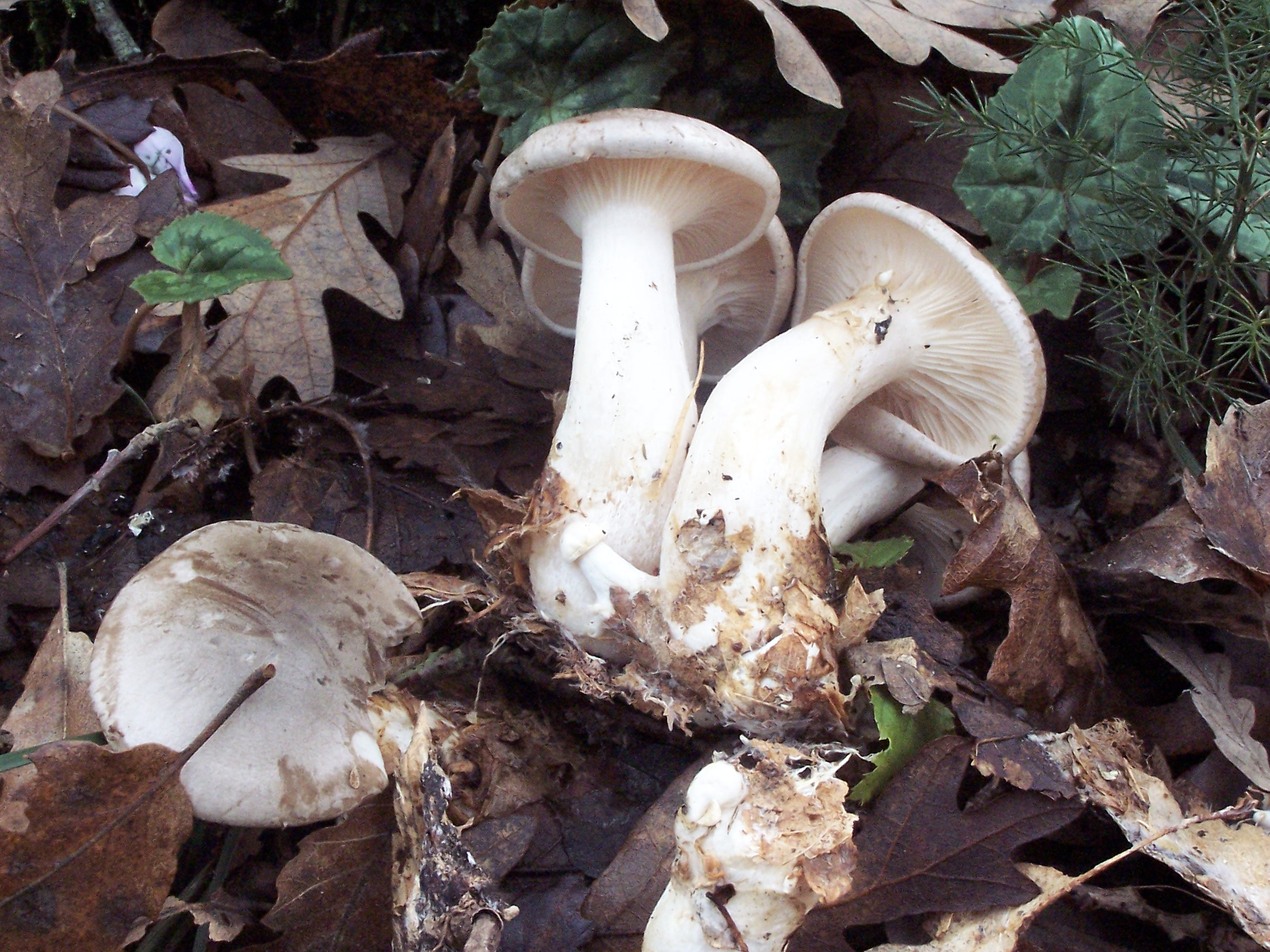
- Clitocybe nebularis

Scientific classification
- Kingdom: Fungi
- Division: Basidiomycota
- Class: Agaricomycetes
- Order: Agaricales
- Family: Clitocybaceae
- Genus: Clitocybe (Fr.) Staude (1857)

Type species
- Clitocybe nebularis (Batsch) P.Kumm. (1871)

Synonyms
- Agaricus subtrib. Dasyphylli Fr. (1821); Agaricus trib. Clitocybe Fr. (1821); Trigonipes Velen. (1939); Clitocybe subgen. Pseudolyophyllum Singer (1943); Singerella Harmaja (1974); Pseudolyophyllum (Singer) Raithelh. (1979)

= Clitocybe =

Genus of fungi

Clitocybe is a genus of mushrooms characterized by white, off-white, buff, cream, pink, or light-yellow spores, gills running down the stem, and pale white to brown or lilac coloration. They are primarily saprotrophic, decomposing forest ground litter.

Clitocybe means sloping head.

A few members of the genus are considered edible; many others are poisonous, containing the toxin muscarine among others. Distinguishing individual species of Clitocybe is generally prohibitively difficult to non-experts, requiring the analysis of microscopic characteristics. Therefore, with the exception of a few charismatic and readily identified members, Clitocybe mushrooms are rarely collected for consumption.

== Taxonomy ==
Clitocybe was originally proposed by Elias Fries in 1821 as a tribe in the genus Agaricus. Friedrich Staude elevated it to generic status in 1857.

Recent molecular work has shown the genus to be polyphyletic: many members are seemingly distantly related and other fungi, such as the field blewit and wood blewit, now known as Clitocybe saeva and C. nuda respectively, are more closely related.

As C. nebularis is the type species, those most distantly related to it would be likely to be reclassified in the future. In a 2003 paper, Finnish mycologist Harri Harmaja proposed C. geotropa and twelve other Clitocybe species be split off into a new genus Infundibulicybe on the basis of spore properties. His C. clavipes was later transferred to the genus Ampulloclitocybe by Redhead and colleagues, that genus name taking precedence over Harmaja's proposed Clavicybe. Other former Clitocybe species have been placed in the genera Atractosporocybe, Leucocybe and Rhizocybe.

== Toxicity ==
The consumption of two species, Clitocybe acromelalga from Japan, and Clitocybe amoenolens from France, has led to several cases of mushroom-induced erythromelalgia which lasted from 8 days to 5 months.

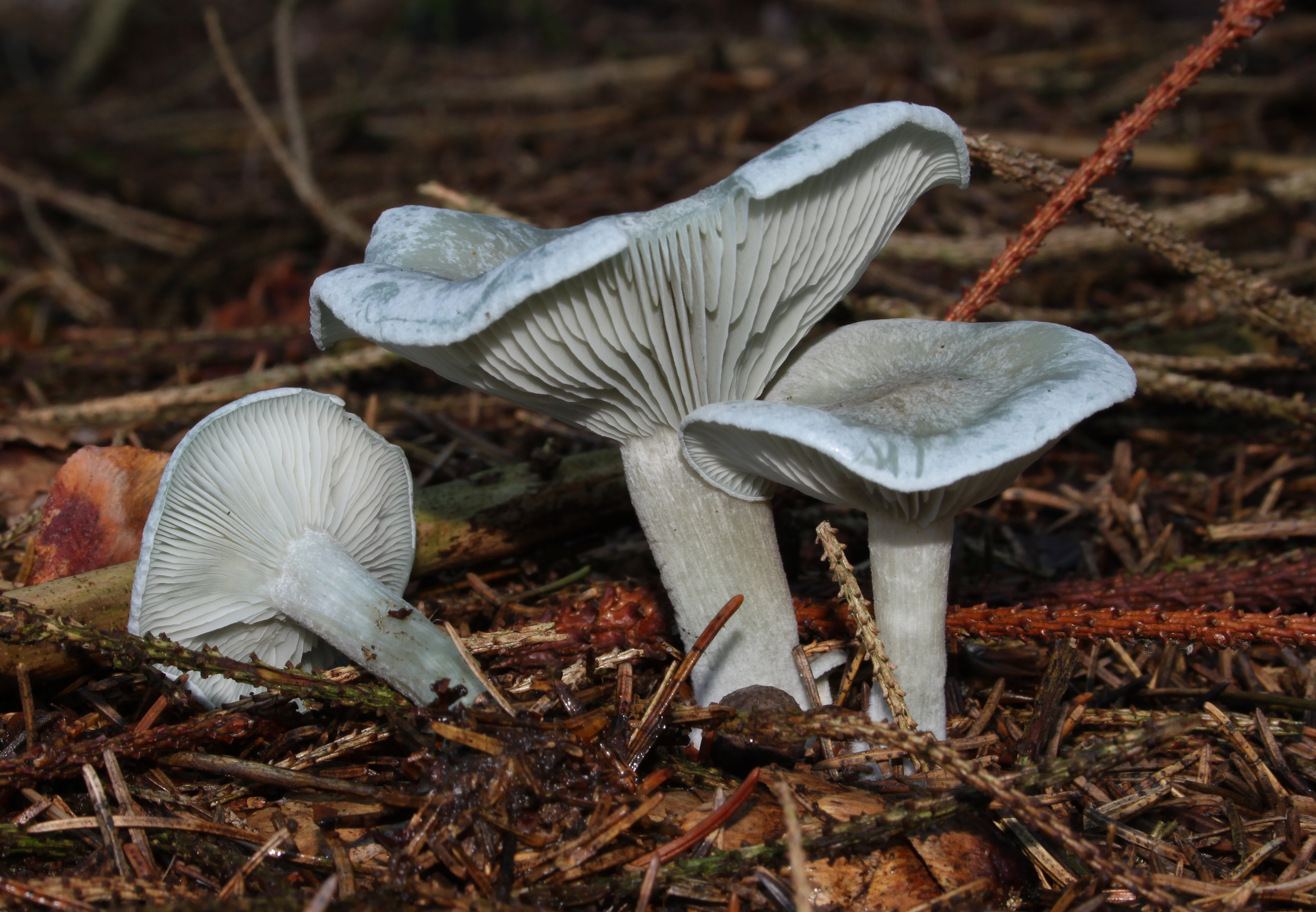
Clitocybe odora

Many small Clitocybe species contain the toxin muscarine, which was originally found in small amounts in the famous fly agaric. However, the small white Clitocybe species contain muscarine in dangerous amounts, and two species in particular, the closely related Clitocybe dealbata and Clitocybe rivulosa, contain muscarine in such amounts that deaths have been recorded for eating those two Clitocybe species.

== Selected species ==
- Clitocybe agrestis
- Clitocybe albirhiza
- Clitocybe amarescens
- Clitocybe brumalis – winter funnel cap
- Clitocybe cerussata
- Clitocybe cistophila – Europe
- Clitocybe costata – may be edible but due to its rareness it is not consumed
- Clitocybe dealbata – ivory funnel, sweating mushroom – Europe, poisonous
- Clitocybe dilatata – poisonous
- Clitocybe ditopus
- Clitocybe eccentrica
- Clitocybe entoloma
- Clitocybe eucalyptorum
- Clitocybe fennica
- Clitocybe fragrans – fragrant funnel
- Clitocybe gilvaoides
- Clitocybe glacialis
- Clitocybe globispora
- Clitocybe glutiniceps
- Clitocybe lohjaensis
- Clitocybe marginella
- Clitocybe menthiodora
- Clitocybe nebularis – clouded agaric – considered edible by some, though causes gastric upset in many people
- Clitocybe odora – aniseed toadstool – grows near birch trees, but can be easily mistaken for poisonous ones mainly because of its appearance
- Clitocybe paraditopa – Australia
- Clitocybe parasitica
- Clitocybe rivulosa – fool's funnel – Europe, North America
- Clitocybe robusta
- Clitocybe ruderalis
- Clitocybe sclerotoidea
- Clitocybe strigosa
- Clitocybe subcordispora
- Clitocybe tarda
- Clitocybe truncicola
- Clitocybe vibecina
- Clitocybe violaceifolia

=== Taxonomic status unclear ===
- Clitocybe maxima – taxonomic status unclear, with Pleurotus giganteus and Infundibulicybe hongyinpan mistaken for this species

Adults of the pleasing fungus beetle Tritoma humeralis have been recorded from a North American "Clitocybe maxima", but whatever mushroom species this refers to, it does not seem to be a regular food source for those beetles.

=== Reclassified ===
- Clitocybe acromelalga, see Paralepistopsis acromelalga
- Clitocybe alexandri, see Clitopaxillus alexandri
- Clitocybe amoenolens, see Paralepistopsis amoenolens – paralysis funnel
- Clitocybe brunneocephala, see Collybia brunneocephala – edible
- Clitocybe candicans, see Leucocybe candicans
- Clitocybe catinus / Infundibulicybe catinus, a white form of Infundibulicybe gibba
- Clitocybe clavipes, see Ampulloclitocybe clavipes – may be edible but poisonous when consumed in conjunction with alcohol
- Clitocybe connata, see Leucocybe connata – inedible, suspected to be mutagenic
- Clitocybe geotropa, see Infundibulicybe geotropa – trooping funnel, monk's head agaric
- Clitocybe gibba, see Infundibulicybe gibba
- Clitocybe illudens, see Omphalotus illudens – jack o'lantern mushroom
- Clitocybe nuda / Lepista nuda, see Collybia nuda – wood blewit – a common edible distinguished in part by its lilac hue
- Clitocybe olearius, see Omphalotus olearius – jack o'lantern mushroom

== See also ==
- List of Tricholomataceae genera
- Mushroom hunting
- Mushroom poisoning
