= Southern Siberian rainforest =

Temperate rainforest in eastern Russia

The Southern Siberian rainforest is an area of temperate rainforest in South Central Siberia that occurs primarily along the Altai and Sayan mountain ranges in Khakassia and Tuva as well as a small area in the Khamar-Daban Mountains near Lake Baikal in Buryatia. The forest encompasses a total area of approximately 6,000 square kilometres (2,300 sq mi). The larger portion of the forest in the Altai and Sayan Mountains runs across a latitude range that encompasses between 51.5 degrees to 56 degrees north latitude, and a longitude range running between 86 degrees to 95 degrees east longitude. The region overlaps with the Golden Mountains of Altai World Heritage Site. Ecological zones range from hemiboreal forest to a forest-steppe ecotone and include a wider variety of plant species than surrounding areas.

== Geography ==
The southern Siberian rainforest is primarily located within the Altai and Sayan mountain ranges across a range of elevations. Geographic features that the forest extends onto include high mountains and ridges as well as valleys carved by glaciers and river basins. The forest-steppe ecotone occurs at elevations as low as 250 to 300 metres (820 feet to 985 feet) while the forest-tundra ecotone is between 1600 and 1800 metres (5250 feet to 5905 feet). The Katun and Biya Rivers, two tributaries of the Ob River that originate in the Altai Mountains, flow through the region.

== Flora ==
Flora in the region represent a combination of species from four biomes: taiga, temperate forests, tundra, and steppe, and are more diverse than flora of many of the surrounding areas. The trees include a mix of coniferous and broadleaf tree species. These include Scots pine, silver birch, Eurasian aspen, Siberian pine, Siberian fir, Siberian spruce and Siberian linden. The hemiboreal zones are dominated by Scots Pine and silver birch in wet areas. Moss cover is present, but sparse. Dry areas are dominated by either Scots pine or Siberian larch depending on temperature. Siberian larch is typically more prevalent in cooler areas while warmer and drier areas favor Scots pine. Siberian larch also dominates the forest-steppe ecotone. Epiphyte species include multiple genera of lichen. These include nitrophyte genera such as Physcia and Melanelia, acidophytes such as Usnea and Bryoria and other genera including Hypogymnia and Sticta. Understory plants include Eurasian baneberry, European wild ginger, Baikal anemone, golden saxifrage, bittercress and grasses of the genera Carex, Brachypodium and Calamagrostis.

== Fauna ==
Terrestrial animals in the region include brown bears, European adders, moles of the Talpa genus, red foxes and red deer, gray wolves, lynx, mountain hares, and several species of mustelids including stoats and wolverines. Bird species include hazel grouse, tree pipits, Eurasian three-toed woodpeckers, golden eagles, peregrine falcons, black storks, northern eagle owls, and gyrfalcons. Aquatic species include moor frogs, Siberian taimen, fish of the genus Cottus, Siberian grayling, Asiatic trout and European otters. Insect fauna include the Siberian silk moth, a plant-eating insect species that lives in the region and feeds on tree leaves.

== Climate ==
The climate in the Siberian temperate forest is continental and humid along the Altai and Sayan mountain ranges. Winter temperatures can be as low as -19 degrees Celsius (-2 degrees Fahrenheit) and summer temperatures can reach as high as 17 degrees (63 degrees Fahrenheit). The region primarily gets precipitation from Atlantic air masses brought in by westerly winds. The climates are more moderate nearby Teletskoje lake and Baikal. Lake Baikal has the effect of cooling incoming air as it reaches the Khamar-Daban Mountains. The incoming air is forced over the mountains, causing moisture to precipitate out. This causes greater annual precipitation in this area than in the surrounding regions, and can exceed 1500 millimeters annually in some places. In addition, relative humidity can average as high as 75% on an annual basis. The region also loses more water to evapotranspiration than surrounding areas. Current climate change projections predict that local temperatures will increase, causing the forest to expand into nearby alpine tundra areas. Climate change is also expected to result in decreased precipitation in the region.

== Threats ==
Conifer trees in the region have been industrially logged, sometimes illegally, for more than a century. Clear cutting was particularly common with Siberian pine, which was seen as particularly valuable. The removal of these trees is a cause of increased soil erosion due to a lack of roots. Fire also is a disturbance that is most common in areas with Scots pine stands and is expected to increase in frequency as temperatures rise due to climate change. Forest regeneration in these areas is hindered by the faster growth and spread of grasses, particularly the genus Calamagrostis. Insect outbreaks are a threat to many of the tree species in the region. One example of this type of disturbance is the Siberian silkmoth, a species of moth that eats the leaves and needles of broadleaf and coniferous trees respectively. Its most recent outbreak was in 2002. Tree mortality from insect outbreaks and fungal infestations further increases the risk of forest fires due to the increase of combustible material from dead trees, including the trunks which can act as ladder fuel.

== Conservation ==
The Golden Mountains of Altai World Heritage Site includes part of the forest in the Altai Mountains. The Russian government has also set up multiple nature reserves. Three are in the Altai Mountains: the Altaysky and Katunsky Nature Reserves, which are also in the Golden Mountains of Altai World Heritage Site, and the Ubsunur Hollow Biosphere Reserve, which is also a World Heritage Site. The Kuznetsk Alatau Nature Reserve is located near the Sayan Mountains. The region near Lake Baikal includes the Baikal Nature Reserve.

== See also ==
- South Siberian Mountains
