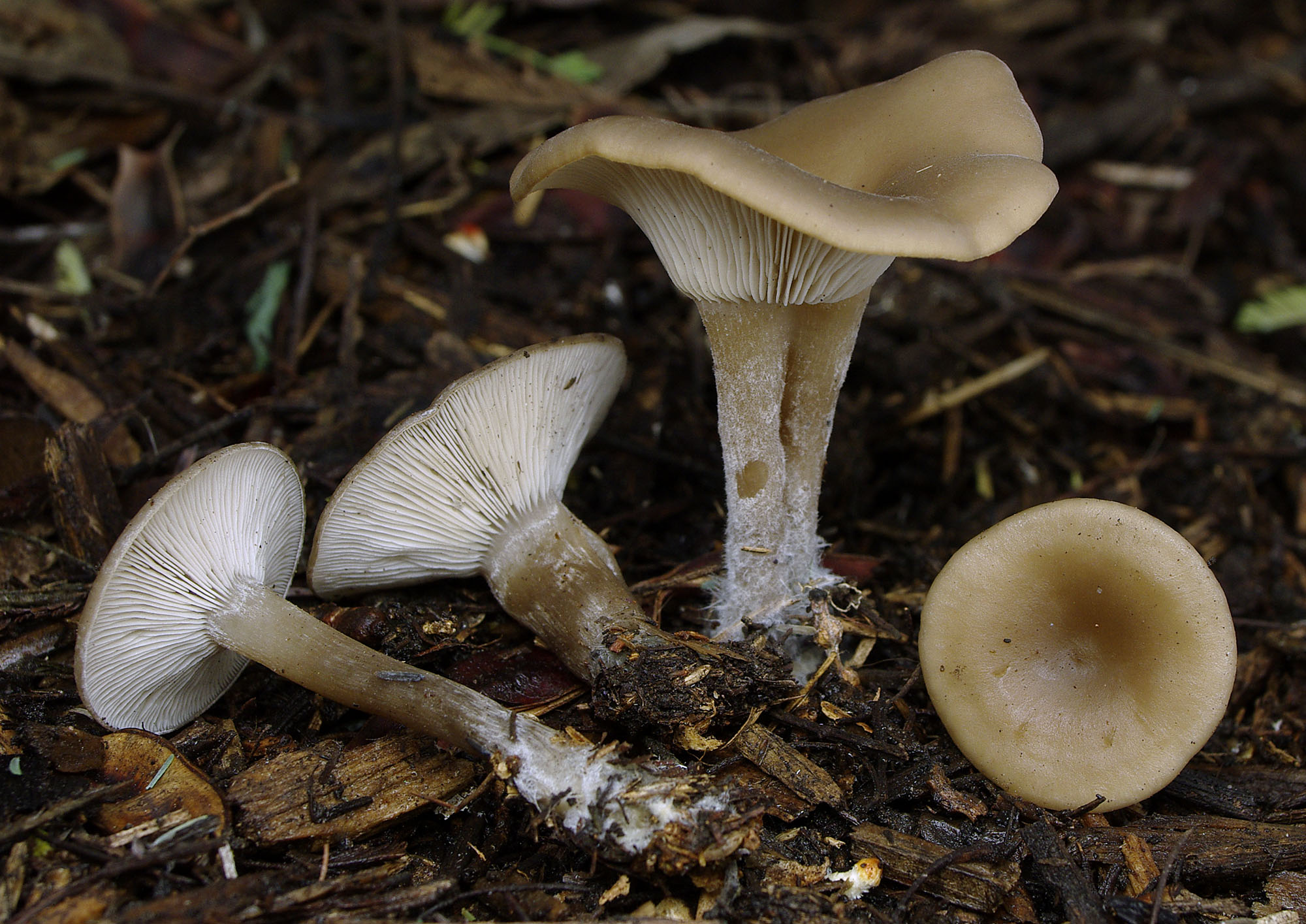
- Singerocybe clitocyboides, Australia

Scientific classification
- Domain: Eukaryota
- Kingdom: Fungi
- Division: Basidiomycota
- Class: Agaricomycetes
- Order: Agaricales
- Family: Clitocybaceae
- Genus: Singerocybe; Harmaja (1988)

Type species
- Singerocybe viscida Harmaja (1988)

= Singerocybe =

Genus of fungi

Singerocybe is a genus of fungi that contains six species. Singerocybe was circumscribed by the Finnish mycologist Harri Harmaja in 1988 with Singerocybe viscida as the type species.

Phylogenetically, it is closely related to Leucopaxillus and Entoloma.

== Etymology ==
Singerocybe was named after mycologist Rolf Singer.

== Species ==
- Singerocybe adirondackensis
- Singerocybe alboinfundibuliformis
- Singerocybe clitocyboides
- Singerocybe humilis
- Singerocybe phaeophthalma
- Singerocybe umbilicata
- Singerocybe viscida (type species)

== See also ==
- List of Agaricales genera
