= Forest steppe =

Vegetation zone

The East European forest steppe (ecoregion PA0419)

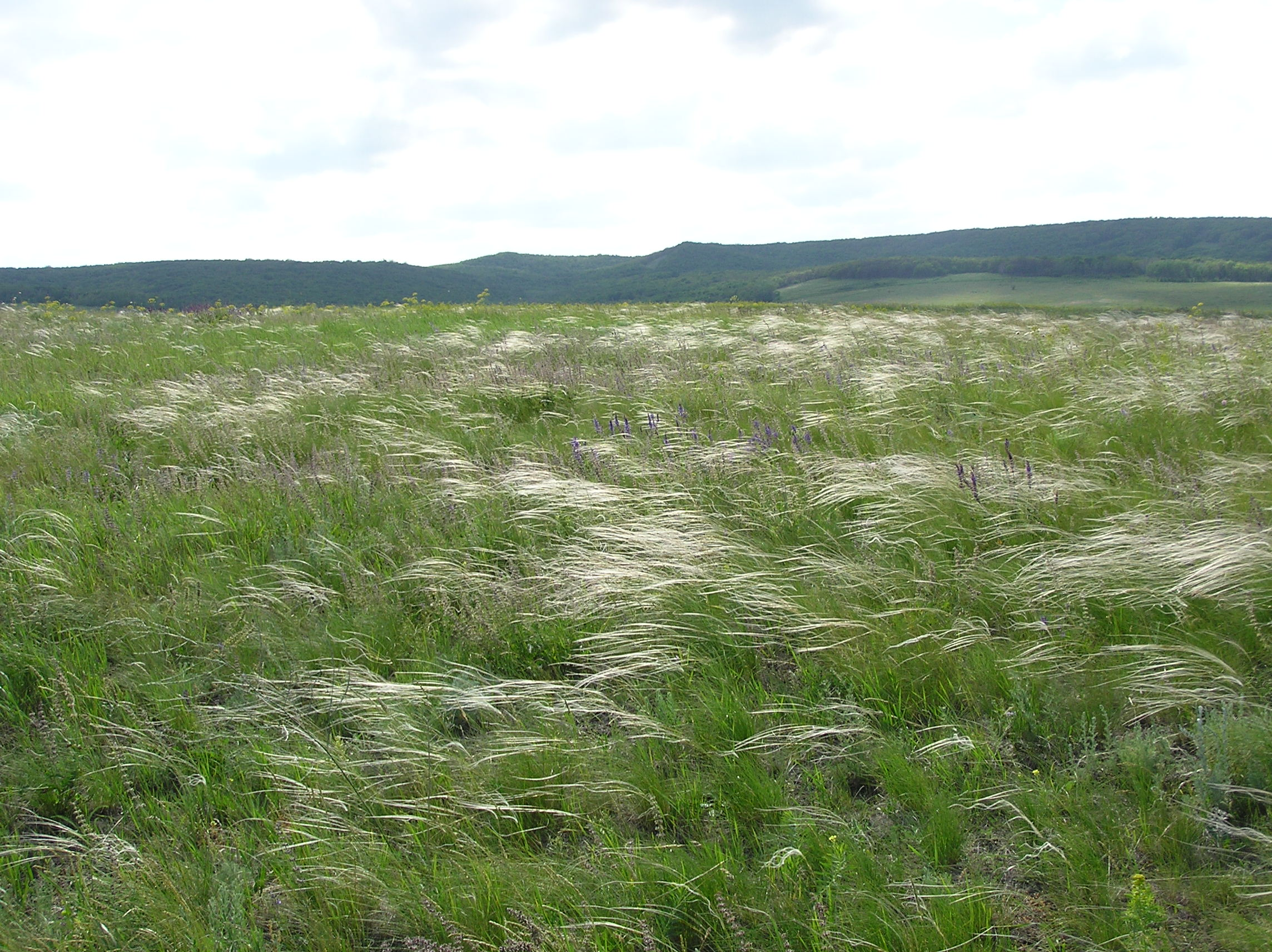
Forest steppe landscape on the Volga Upland near the city of Saratov, Russia

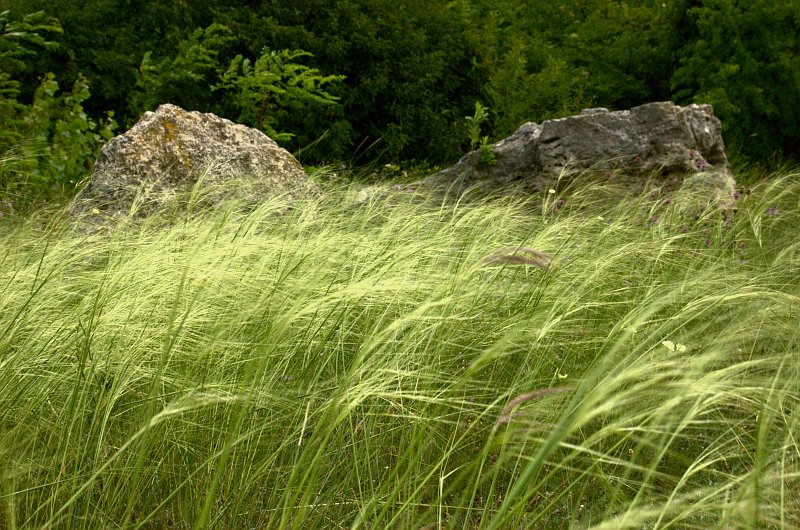
Devín forest steppe in Slovakia

A forest steppe is a temperate-climate ecotone and habitat type composed of grassland interspersed with areas of woodland or forest.

== Locations ==
Forest steppe primarily occurs in a belt of forest steppes across northern Eurasia from the eastern lowlands of Europe to eastern Siberia in northeast Asia. It forms transition ecoregions between the temperate grasslands and temperate broadleaf and mixed forests biomes. Much of Russia belongs to the forest steppe zone, stretches from Central Russia, across Volga, Ural, Siberian and Far East Russia.

In upper North America another example of the forest steppe ecotone is the aspen parkland in the central Prairie Provinces, northeastern British Columbia, North Dakota, and Minnesota. It is the transition ecoregion from the Great Plains prairie and steppe temperate grasslands in the south to the Taiga biome forests in the north.

In central Asia the forest steppe ecotone is found in ecoregions in the mountains of the Iranian Plateau, in Iran, Afghanistan, and Balochistan.

== Forest steppe ecoregions ==
- East European forest steppe forms a transition between the Central European and Sarmatic mixed forests to the north and the Pontic–Caspian steppe to the south. It extends from Romania in the west to the Ural Mountains in the east.
- The Kazakh forest steppe lies east of the Urals, between the West Siberian broadleaf and mixed forests and the Kazakh steppe.
- Altai montane forest and forest steppe
- The Southern Siberian rainforest includes forest-steppe areas.
- Selenge-Orkhon forest steppe
- The Daurian forest steppe lies between the Trans-Baikal conifer forests and East Siberian Taiga to the north and the Mongolian-Manchurian grassland to the south.
- Zagros Mountains forest steppe
- Elburz Range forest steppe
- Kopet Dag woodlands and forest steppe
- Kuhrud-Kohbanan Mountains forest steppe
- Canadian Aspen forests and parklands—North Dakota, Minnesota, and Canada
