= Pleurozium =

Scientific classification
- Kingdom: Plantae
- Division: Bryophyta
- Class: Bryopsida
- Subclass: Bryidae
- Order: Hypnales
- Family: Hylocomiaceae
- Genus: Pleurozium

Genus of mosses

Pleurozium is a genus of mosses belonging to the family Hylocomiaceae.

The genus has almost cosmopolitan distribution.

Species:

- Pleurozium flagellare (Schimp.) Kindb.
- Pleurozium quitense (Mitt.) B.H.Allen & Magill
- Pleurozium schreberi (Brid.) Mitt.
