= Trama (mycology) =

Mushroom flesh

In mycology, the term trama is used in two ways. In the broad sense, it is the inner, fleshy portion of a mushroom's basidiocarp, or fruit body. It is distinct from the outer layer of tissue, known as the pileipellis or cuticle, and from the spore-bearing tissue layer known as the hymenium. In essence, the trama is the tissue that is commonly referred to as the "flesh" of mushrooms and similar fungi.

The second use is more specific, and refers to the "hymenophoral trama" that supports the hymenium. It is similarly interior, connective tissue, but it is more specifically the central layer of hyphae running from the underside of the mushroom cap to the lamella or gill, upon which the hymenium rests. Various types have been classified by their structure, including trametoid, cantharelloid, boletoid, and agaricoid, with agaricoid the most common by far. In the agarcoid type, the central trama's hyphae usually run parallel to each other, with a clear boundary area called a sub-hymenium followed by the hymenium itself on the outer layer facing the environment.

The word "trama" is Latin for the "weft" or "woof" yarns in the weaving of cloth. This is related to the basidiocarp trama being "filler" tissue and that analogously the woof yarn in weaving is sometimes called "fill". Furthermore, the trama tends to be soft tissue, and in weaving, the woof yarn is not tightly stretched; it therefore need not as a rule be as strong as the warp yarn.
