= Hemiboreal =

Subdivision of the boreal forest

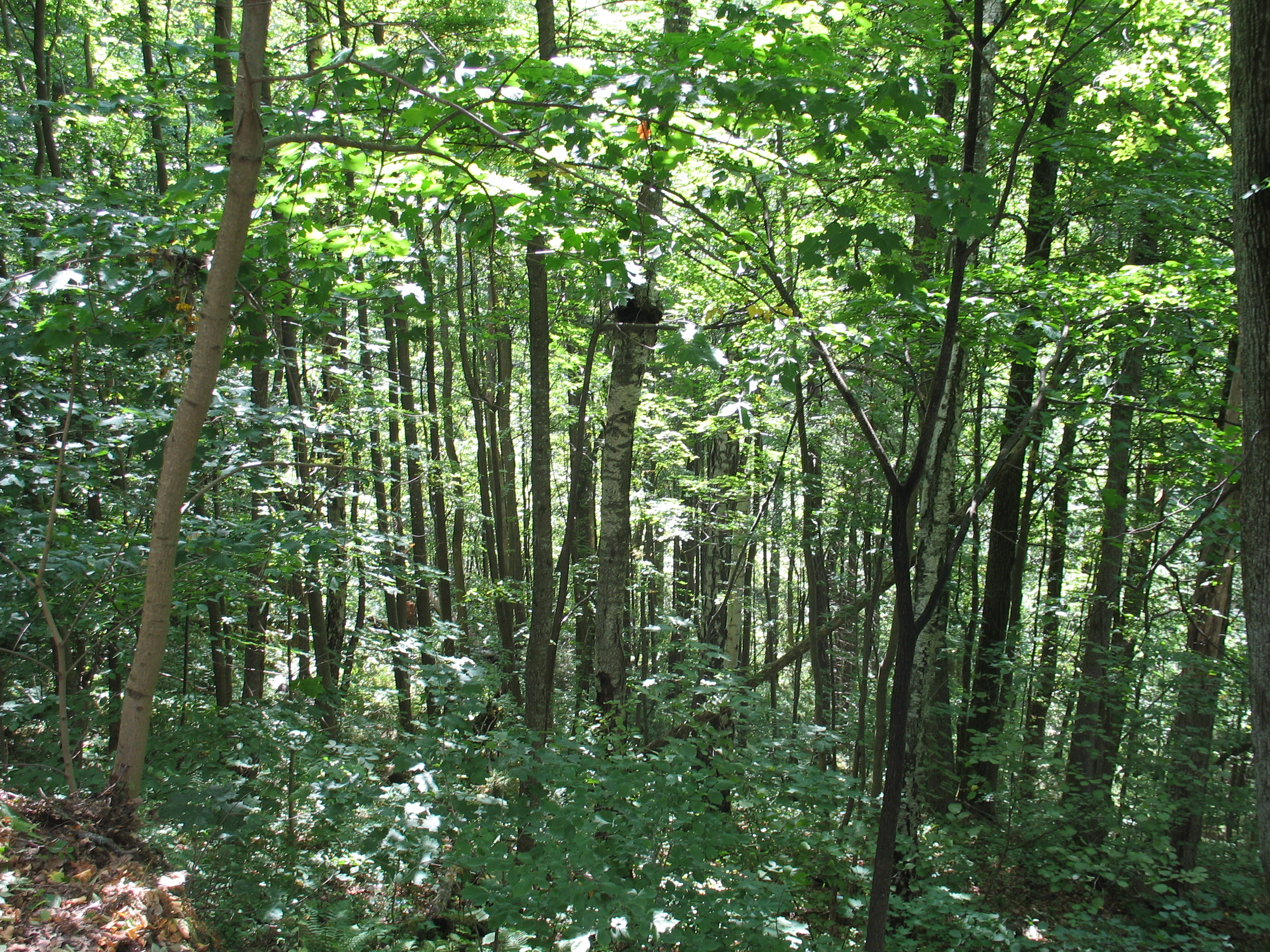
Hemiboreal forest in Latvia. Latvia, like other hemiboreal areas, also has extensive lush coniferous forests.

The hemiboreal forest is a large transition zone comprising the area between cold temperate mixed forests and pure boreal forests. The term is most frequently used in the context of climates and ecosystems.

== Botany ==
Hemiboreal forests have some characteristics of pure boreal forests to the north, while also sharing features with cool temperate forests to the south. A significant number of tree species, such as aspens, oaks, pines, maples, spruce trees, ash trees, beeches, birches, cedars (cypress), and hornbeams, can be found.

== Climate ==
The term sometimes denotes the form of climate characteristic of the zone of hemiboreal forests—specifically, the climates designated Dfb, Dwb and Dsb in the Köppen climate classification scheme. On occasion, it is applied to all areas that have long, cold winters and warm (but not hot) summers—which also including areas that are semiarid (BS) and arid (BW) based on average annual precipitation. It can also be applied to some areas with a subpolar oceanic climate (Cfc), particularly those with continental climate characteristics.

== Examples ==
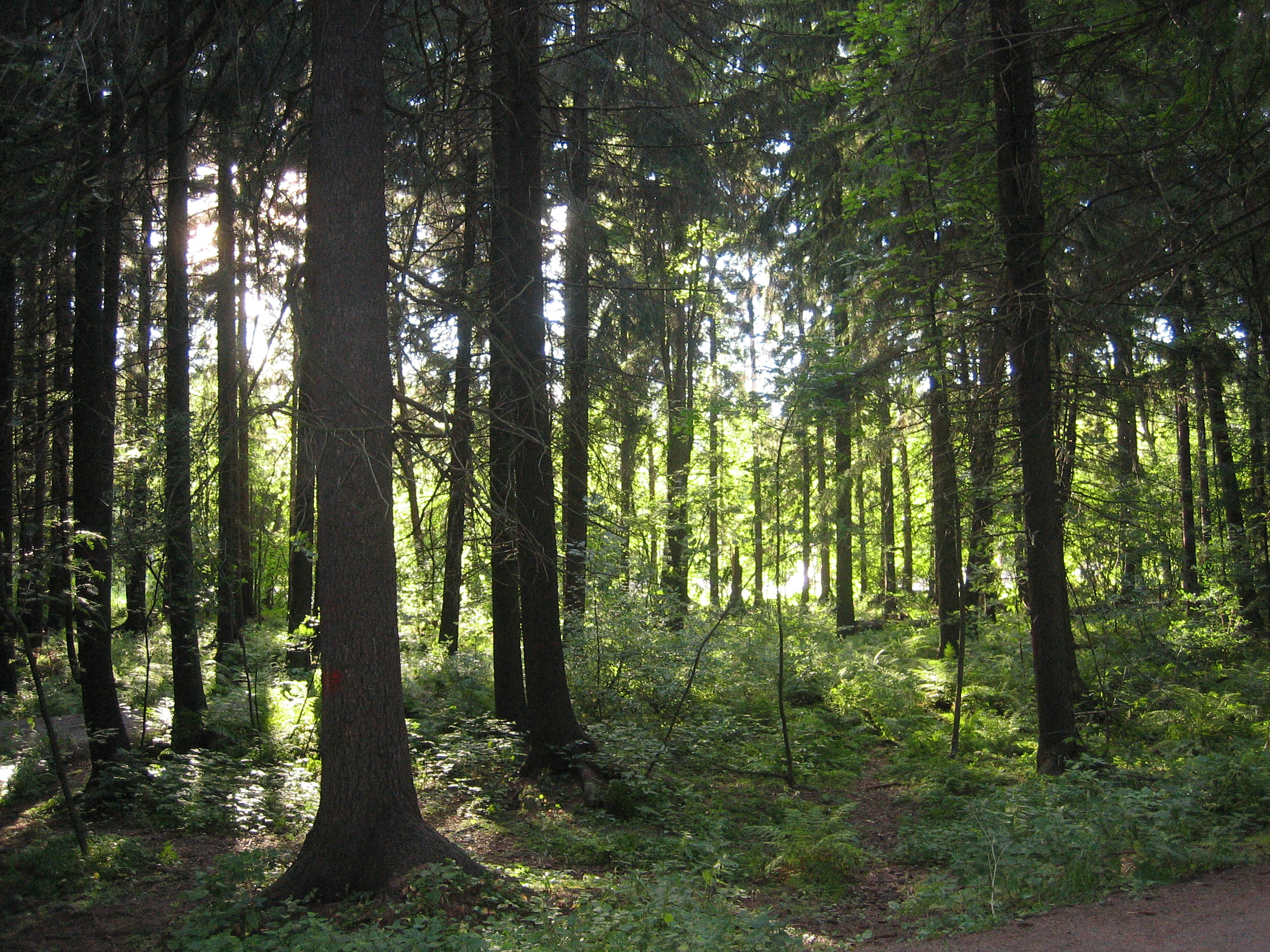
In the southernmost part of Finland, coniferous forests are lush and noble deciduous trees grow here and there. Hemiboreal coniferous forest in Helsinki Central Park; notice the species of grove in the field layer.

Examples of locations with hemiboreal climates or ecosystems include:

- Much of southern Canada (all of southeastern Canada except for parts of southern Ontario as well as the central Prairie Provinces outside the grasslands) Including the Bruce Peninsula
- Within the United States: most parts of Michigan, Wisconsin, and Minnesota, along with eastern North Dakota and the Adirondacks of New York State and Northern New England; also, many mountain areas in the western United States
- The Southern Siberian rainforest in Russia includes hemiboreal forests
- Parts of northeast China bordering Russia
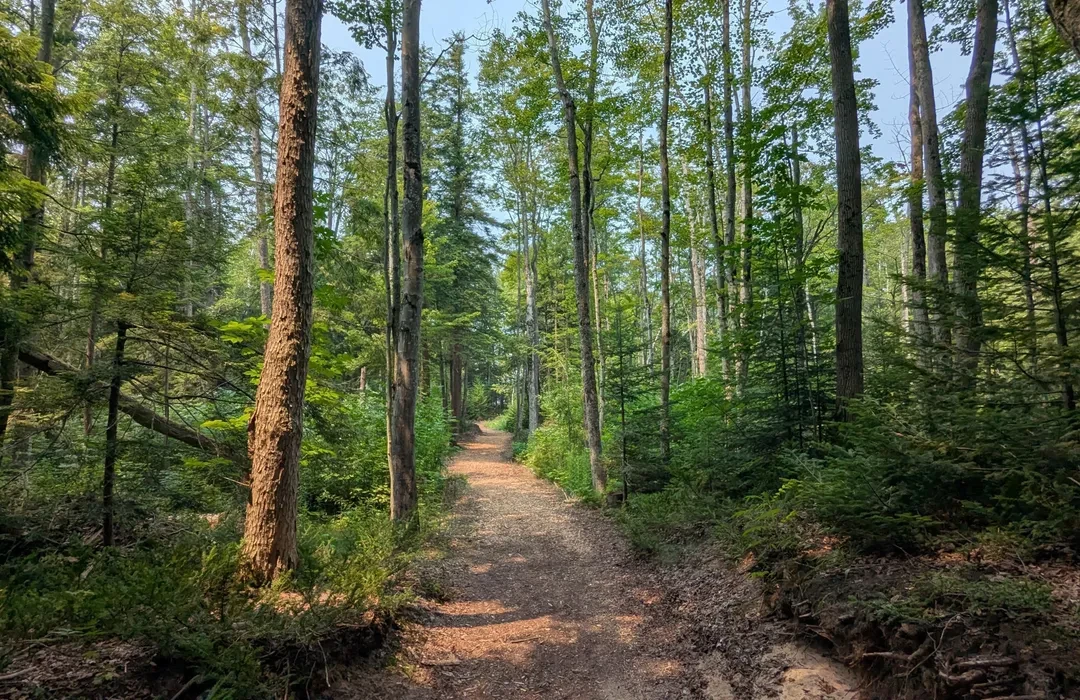
- A hemiboreal forest in Southampton, Ontario
  Northern areas of Japan including southern Hokkaido and the northernmost parts of Honshu
- Parts of southern Norway and southern Sweden except the most southern municipalities
- Latvia, Lithuania, Belarus and Estonia
- Coastal zone and archipelago of Turku in Finland and region of Åland
- The Australian Alps in eastern Victoria and southeastern New South Wales, which makes up a small portion in the southeastern region of the continent, and the Central Highlands in Tasmania
- The Southern Alps in New Zealand's South Island
- on the Wet Andes region located in the Southern Cone of South America, it has characteristics of a Mediterranean-influenced continental climate
