= Decurrent =

Term used in botany and mycology

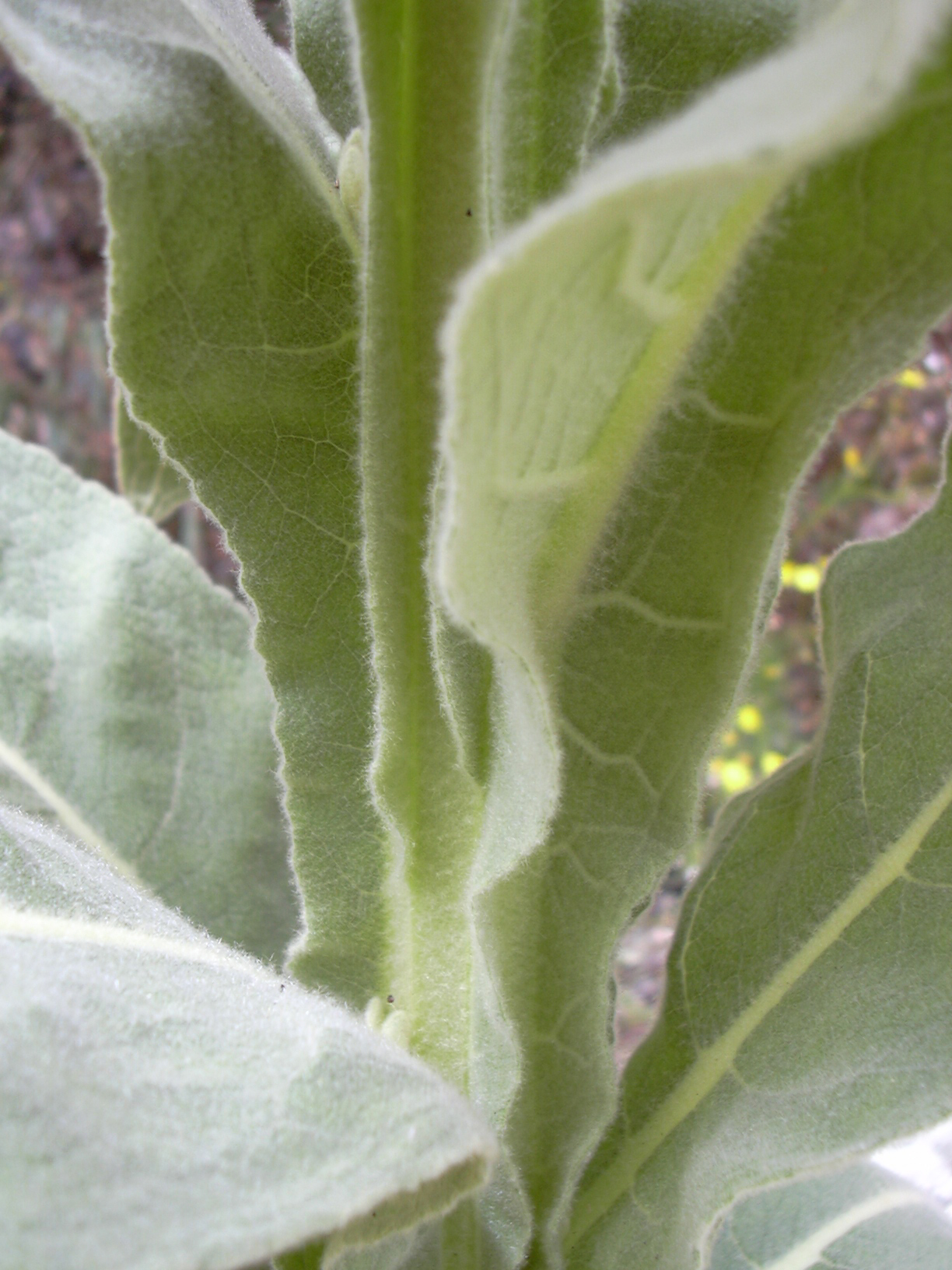
Decurrent leaves in common mullein (Verbascum thapsus)

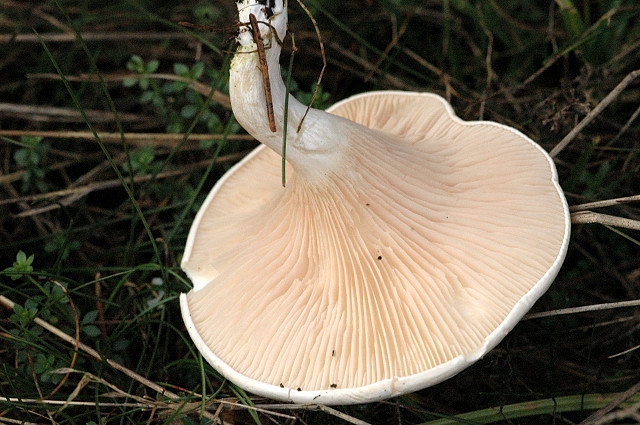
The mushroom Clitopilus prunulus has strongly decurrent gills.
And it is upside down.
"Decurrent" means the gills form close to the stalk, away from the cap.

Decurrent (sometimes decurring) is a term used in botany and mycology to describe plant or fungal parts that extend downward.

In botany, the term is most often applied to leaf blades that partly wrap or have wings around the stem or petiole and extend down along the stem. A "decurrent branching habit" is a plant form common for shrubs and most angiosperm trees, contrasted with the excurrent or "cone-shaped crown" common among many gymnosperms. The decurrent habit is characterized by having weak apical dominance that eventually produces a rounded or spreading tree crown. Examples of trees with decurrent habit are most hardwood trees: oak, hickory, maple, etc.

In mycology, the term is most often applied to the hymenophore of a basidiocarp (such as the lamellae or "gills" of a mushroom or the "pores" of a bracket fungus) when it is broadly attached to and extends down the stipe.
