= Hygrophanous =

Color change of mushrooms based on water content

The adjective hygrophanous refers to the color change of mushroom tissue (especially the pileus surface) as it loses or absorbs water, which causes the pileipellis to become more transparent when wet and opaque when dry.

When identifying hygrophanous species, one needs to be careful when matching colors to photographs or descriptions, as color can change dramatically soon after picking.

Genera that are characterized by hygrophanous species include Agrocybe, Psathyrella, Psilocybe, Panaeolus, and Galerina.

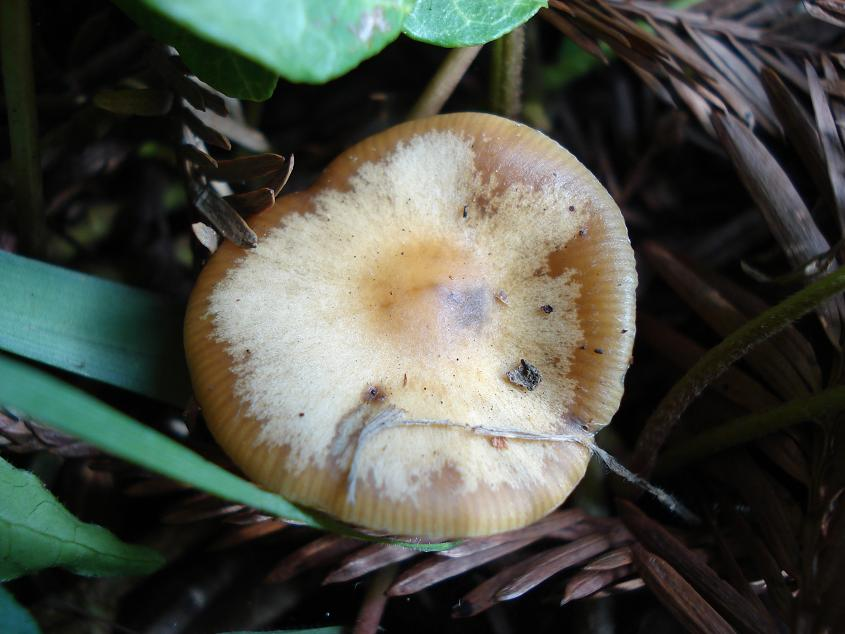
Hygrophanous pileus of Psilocybe cyanescens

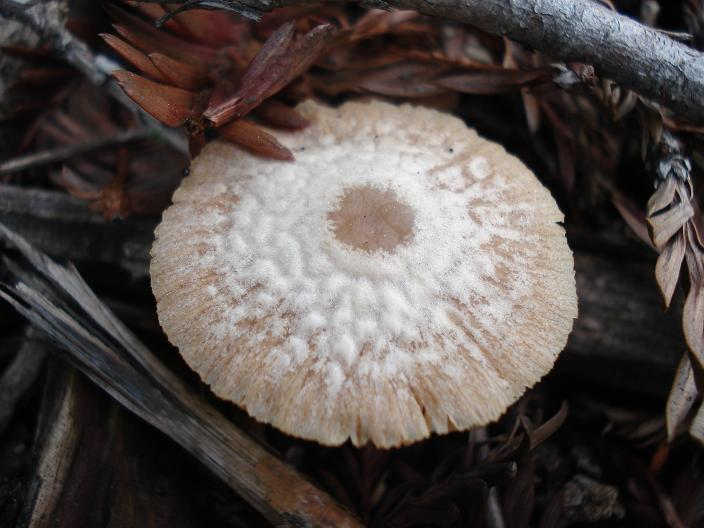
Hygrophanous pileus of Tubaria furfuracea

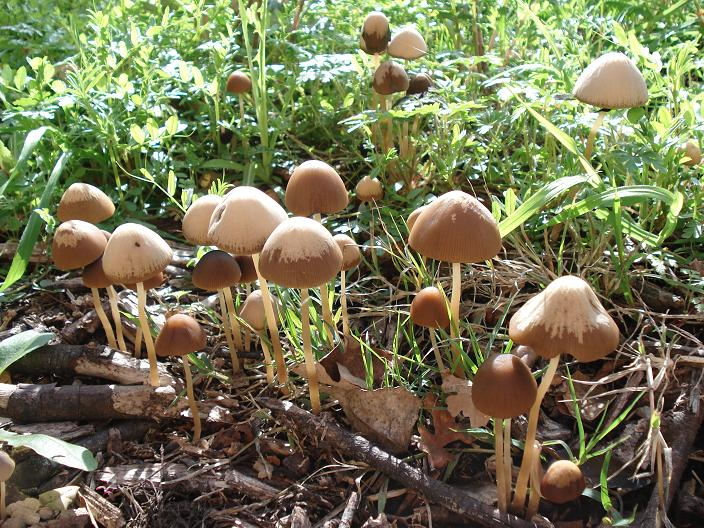
Grouping of Psathyrella gracilis, some displaying hygrophanous pilei.

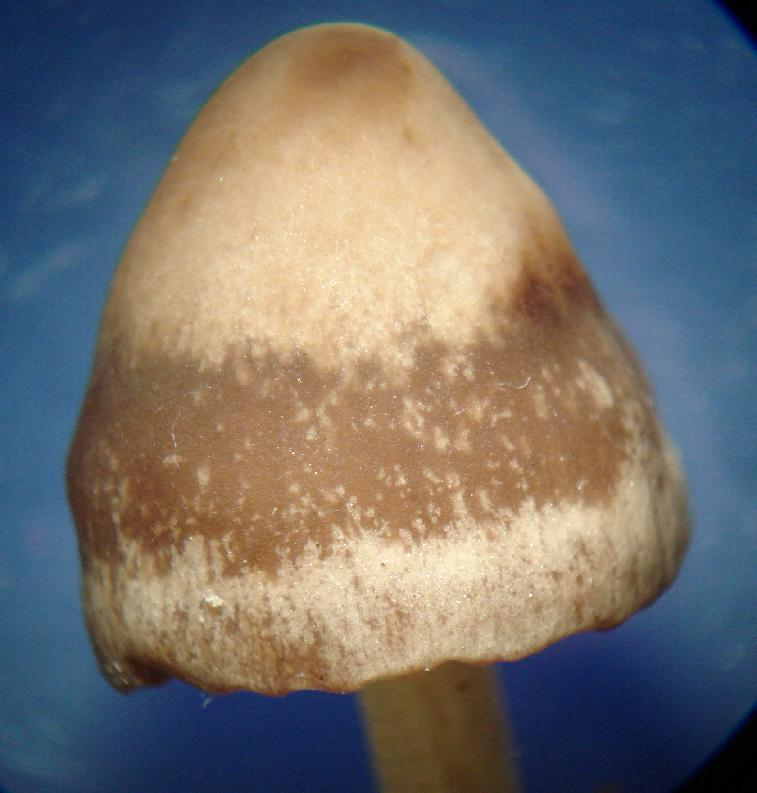
Photo of the hygrophanous pileus of Panaeolina foenisecii
