= Boreal ecosystem =

Subarctic terrestrial ecozone

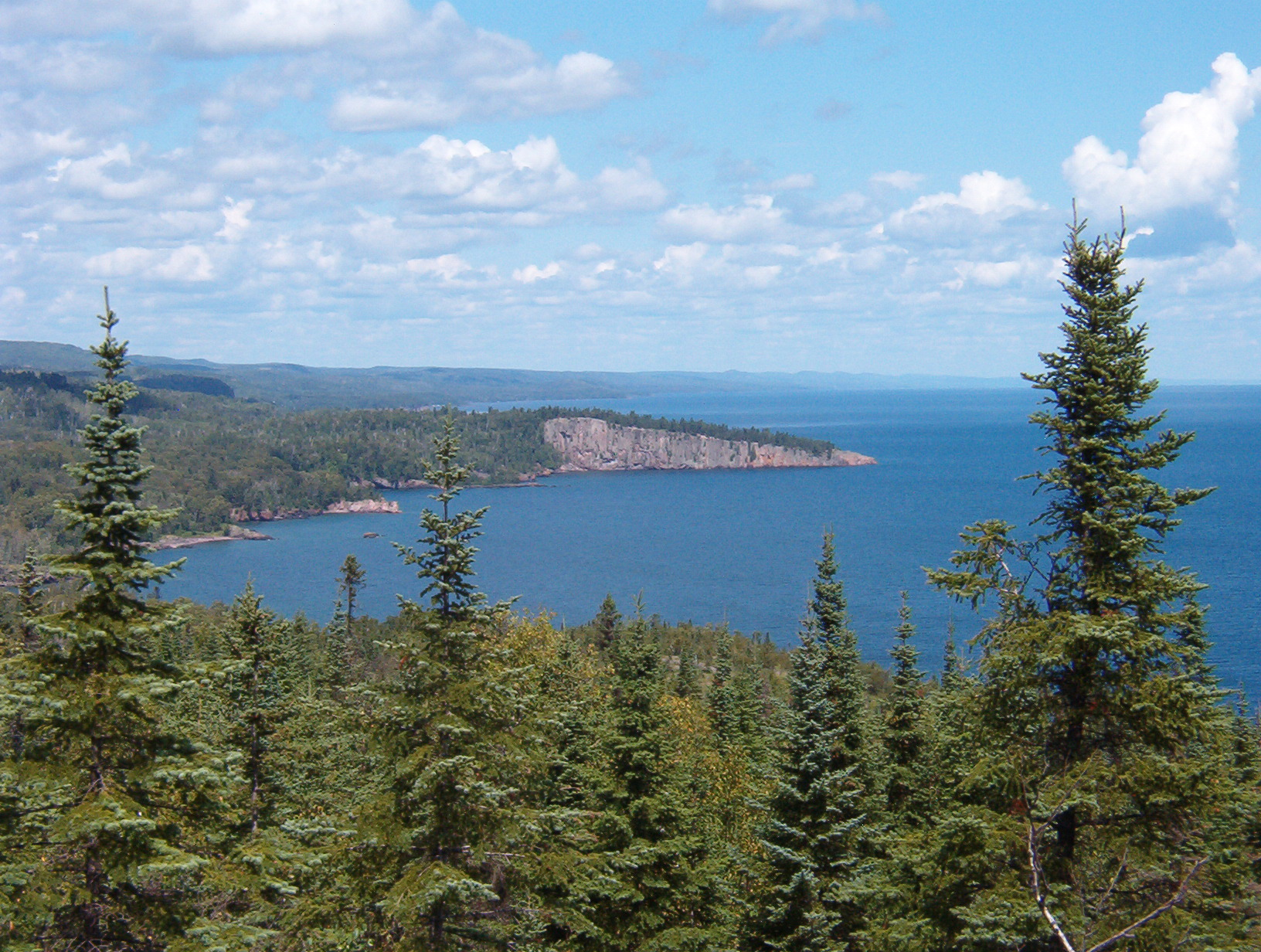
Boreal forest near Shovel Point in Tettegouche State Park, along the northern shore of Lake Superior in Minnesota.

A boreal ecosystem is an ecosystem with a subarctic climate located in the Northern Hemisphere, approximately between 50° and 70°N latitude. These ecosystems are commonly known as taiga and are located in parts of North America, Europe, and Asia. The ecosystems that lie immediately to the south of boreal zones are often called hemiboreal. There are a variety of processes and species that occur in these areas as well.

The Köppen symbols of boreal ecosystems are Dfc, Dwc, Dfd, and Dwd.

Boreal ecosystems are some of the most vulnerable to climate change. Both loss of permafrost, reductions in cold weather and increases in summer heat cause significant changes to ecosystems, displacing cold-adapted species, increasing forest fires, and making ecosystems vulnerable to changing to other ecosystem types. These changes can cause Climate change feedback cycles, where thawing permafrost and changing ecosystems release more greenhouse gas emissions into the atmosphere causing more climate change.

== Boreal Species ==
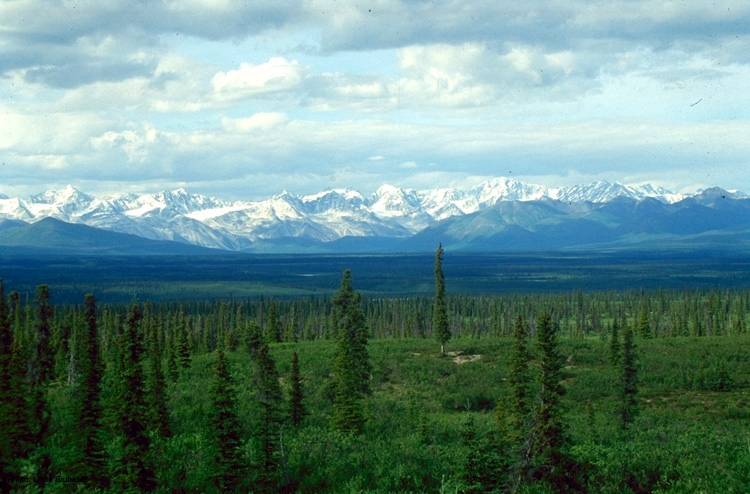
White spruce taiga in the Alaska Range, Alaska, United States

The species within boreal ecosystems varies as it consists of both terrestrial and aquatic habitats. The species composition include many generalized and less specialized feeders. From the equator to the poles, species richness decreases, and there is a negative relationship with species richness changes as climate changes.

However, despite not being as biodiverse as tropical systems, this area has a variety of species. Boreal ecosystems are filled with a multitude of flora species from black and white spruce, to willows, wildflowers, and alders. Caribou, although not there year round, come down and into these regions during the winter to forage for lichen. A few fish species include salmonids, smelts, sticklebacks, lamprey and sculpins. For salmon these systems are vital: relying on the riparian systems within boreal ecosystems for multiple life stages in both the beginning and the end of their life cycle, sockeye rely on the provided freshwater environments as eggs, fry and adult stages.

== Succession ==
Success and succession happen in tandem in boreal forests. Primary succession, while part of the original landscape formation, is not vital like secondary succession. Secondary succession consists of varied events: wildfires, flooding, mudslides and even excessive insect foraging act in this progression and cycle of boreal forests.

== Boreal Ecosystem-Atmosphere Study (BOREAS) ==
The Boreal Ecosystem-Atmosphere Study (BOREAS) was a major international research field study in the Canadian boreal forest. The main research was completed between the years of 1994-1996, and the program was sponsored by NASA. The primary objectives were to determine how the boreal forest interacts with the atmosphere, how climate change will affect the forest, and how changes in the forest affect weather and climate.

== Climate change effects ==
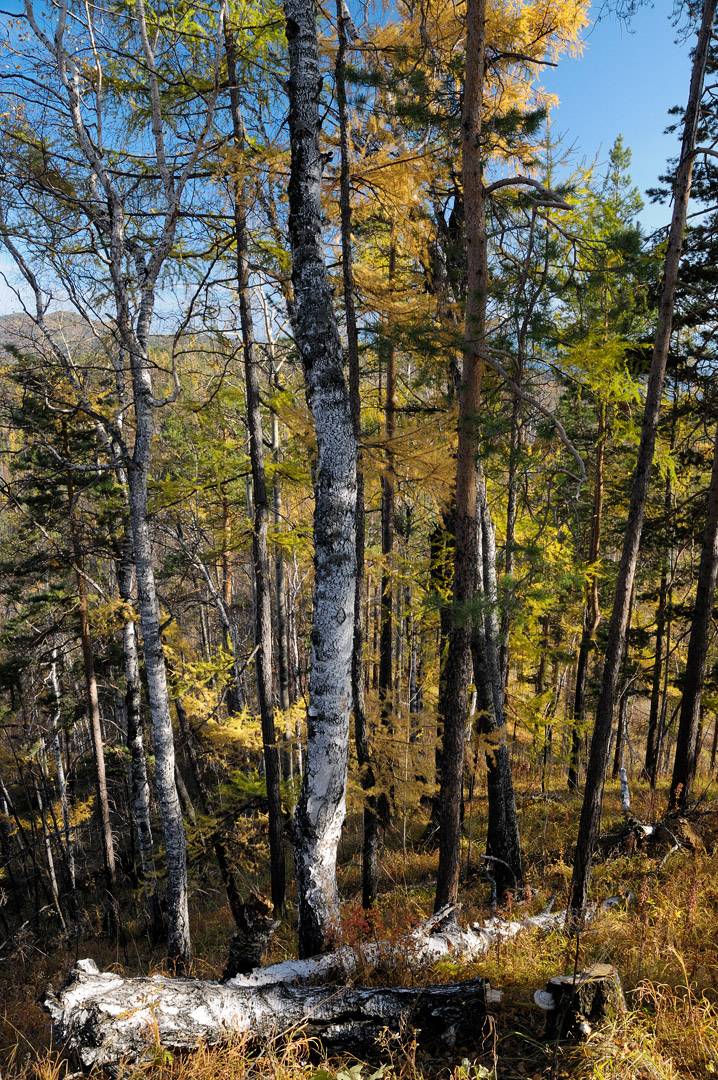
Boreal forest near Lake Baikal in Russia

Boreal ecosystems display high sensitivity towards both natural and anthropogenic climate change. Due to greenhouse gas emissions, atmospheric warming ultimately leads to a chain reaction of climatic and ecological effects. The initial effects of climate change on the boreal ecosystem can include, but are not limited to, changes in temperature, rainfall, and growing season. Based on studies from the boreal ecosystems in the Yukon, a territory in northwestern Canada, climate change is having an impact on these abiotic factors. As a consequence, these effects drive changes in forest ecotone as well as marshlands or lakes in boreal ecosystems. This also concerns plant productivity and predator-prey interactions, which ultimately leads to habitat loss, fragmentation, and threatens biodiversity.

In terms of boreal trees, the poleward limit for any given species is most likely defined by the temperature, whereas the equatorward limit is generally defined by competitive exclusion. As changes in climate occur, change in the corresponding weather variables follows, and ecosystem alterations involving timing for migration, mating, and plant blooming can occur. This can lead to the transition into a different type of ecosystem as the northward shift of plant and animal species has already been observed. Trees may expand towards the tundra; however, they may not survive due to various temperature or precipitation stressors. The rate depends on growth and reproductive rate, and adaptation ability of the vegetation. In addition, the migration of flora may lag behind warming for a few decades to a century, and in most cases warming happens faster than plants can keep up.

Due to permafrost thaw and disturbance alterations such as fire and insect outbreaks, certain models have suggested that boreal forests have developed into a net carbon source instead of a net carbon sink. Although the trees in the boreal are aging, they continue to accumulate carbon into their biomass. However, if disturbed, higher than normal amounts of carbon will be lost to the atmosphere.

In some areas, boreal ecosystems are located on a layer of permafrost, which is a layer of permanently frozen soil. The underground root systems of boreal trees are stabilized by permafrost, a process which permits the deeper trapping of carbon in the soil and aids in the regulation of hydrology. Permafrost is able to store double the amount of current atmospheric carbon that can be mobilized and released to the atmosphere as greenhouse gases when thawed under a warming climate feedback. Boreal ecosystems contain approximately 338 Pg (petagrams) of carbon in their soil, this is comparable to the amount which is stored in biomass in tropical ecosystems.

== Ecosystem services ==
In boreal ecosystems, carbon cycling is a major producer of ecosystem services especially timber production and climate regulation. The boreal ecosystem in Canada is one of the largest carbon reservoirs in the world. Moreover, these boreal ecosystems in Canada possess high hydroelectric potential and are thus able to contribute to the resource-based economy. Through ecosystem assessment, inventory data, and modeling, scientists are able to determine the relationships between ecosystem services and biodiversity and human influence.

Forests themselves are producers of lumber products, regulation of water, soil and air quality. Within the past decade, the number of studies focusing on the relationships between ecosystem services has been increasing. This is due to the rise of human management of ecosystems through the manipulation of one ecosystem service to utilize its maximum productivity. Ultimately, this results in the supply decline of other ecosystem services.

== See also ==
- Taiga
- Subarctic climate, also known as "boreal climate"
- Boreal forest of Canada
