= Pileipellis =

Mushroom cap cuticle

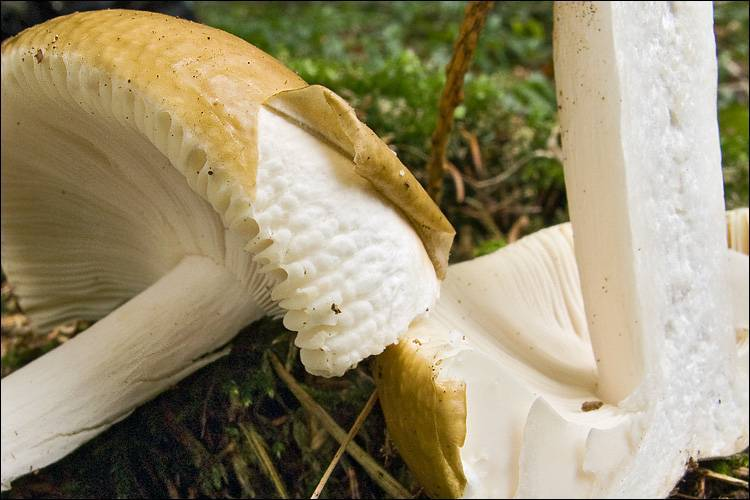
The cuticle of some mushrooms, such as Russula ochroleuca shown here, can be peeled from the cap, and may be useful as an identification feature.

The pileipellis is the uppermost layer of hyphae in the pileus of a fungal fruit body. It covers the trama, the fleshy tissue of the fruit body. The pileipellis is more or less synonymous with the cuticle, but the cuticle generally describes this layer as a macroscopic feature, while pileipellis refers to this structure as a microscopic layer. Pileipellis type is an important character in the identification of fungi. Pileipellis types include the cutis, trichoderm, epithelium, and hymeniderm types.

== Types ==
=== Cutis ===
A cutis is a type of pileipellis characterized by hyphae that are repent, that is, that run parallel to the pileus surface. In an ixocutis, the hyphae are gelatinous.

=== Trichoderm ===
In a trichoderm, the outermost hyphae emerge roughly parallel, like hairs, perpendicular to the cap surface. The prefix "tricho-" comes from a Greek word for "hair". In an ixotrichodermium, the outermost hyphae are gelatinous.

=== Epithelium ===
An epithelium is a pileipellis consisting of rounded cells in multiple layers, often connected in chains, and sometimes breaking off.

=== Hymeniderm ===
Also called hymeniform, or palisade at times. When viewed from above, a hymeniderm or "cellular cuticle" appears to be paved with roughly circular polygonal elements (similar to the fertile cells of the actual hymenium on the gills). The elements may be globular cells or may be the tips of hyphae extending deeper into the surface.
