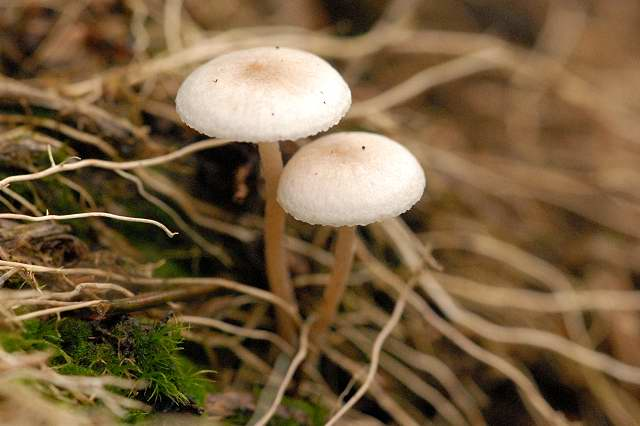
- Collybia cookei

Scientific classification
- Kingdom: Fungi
- Division: Basidiomycota
- Class: Agaricomycetes
- Order: Agaricales
- Suborder: Tricholomatineae
- Family: Clitocybaceae; Vizzini, Consiglio & M. Marchetti (2020)

Type genus
- Clitocybe (Fr.) Staude (1857)

Genera
- Clitocybe; Collybia; Dendrocollybia; Lepista; Lepistella; Pseudolyophyllum; Singerocybe

= Clitocybaceae =

Family of fungi

The Clitocybaceae are a family of fungi in the order Agaricales. It contains 7 genera.

== See also ==
- List of Agaricales families

== Literature ==
- He; Chen; Bau; Wang; Yang (2023), "Systematic arrangement within the family Clitocybaceae (Tricholomatineae, Agaricales): phylogenetic and phylogenomic evidence, morphological data and muscarine-producing innovation", Fungal Diversity, 123 (1): 1–47, doi:10.1007/s13225-023-00527-2
