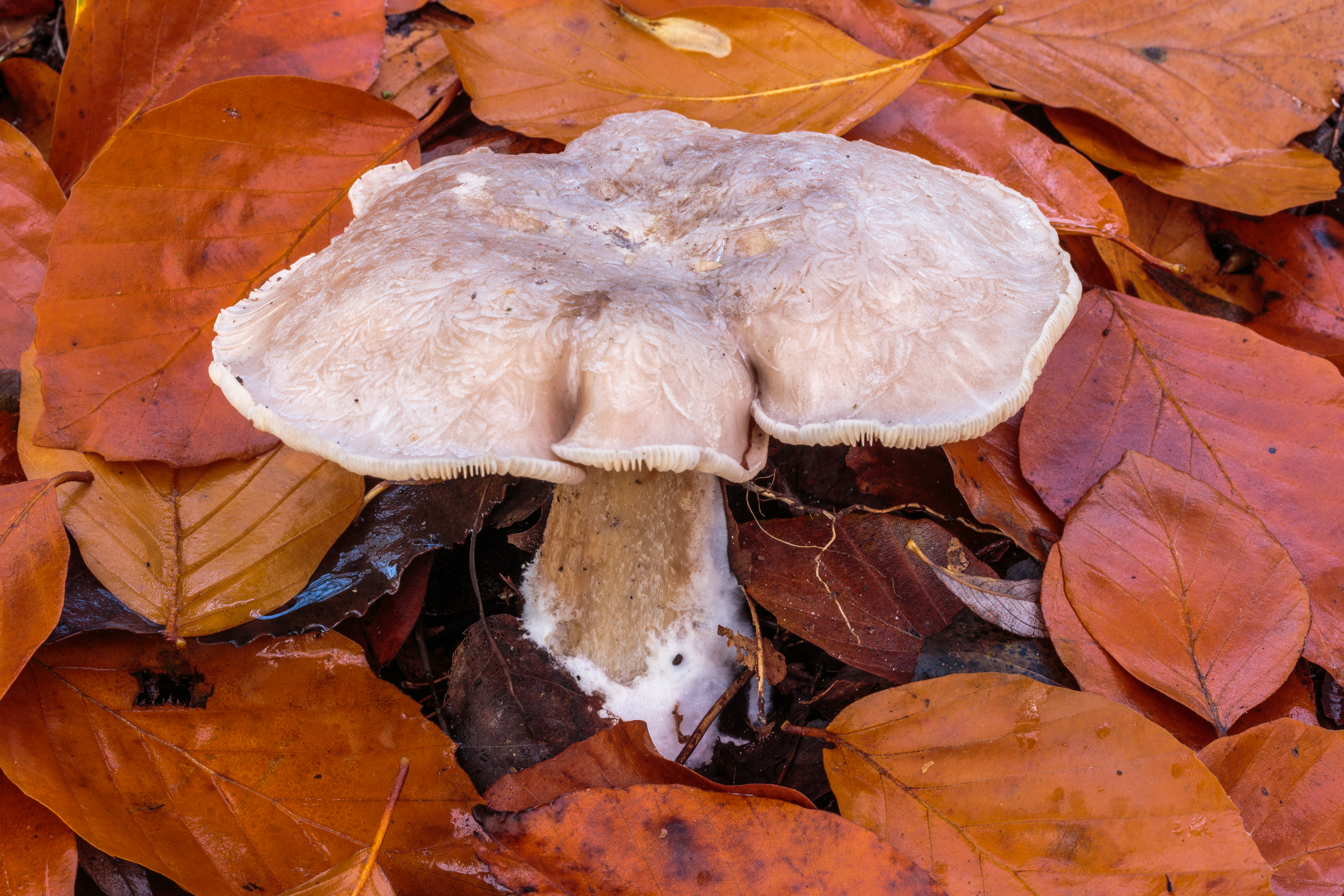

Scientific classification
- Kingdom: Fungi
- Division: Basidiomycota
- Class: Agaricomycetes
- Order: Agaricales
- Family: Clitocybaceae
- Genus: Clitocybe
- Species: C. nebularis

Binomial name
- Clitocybe nebularis (Batsch), P.Kumm. (1871)

Synonyms
- Agaricus nebularis Batsch (1789); Gymnopus nebularis (Batsch) Gray (1821); Omphalia nebularis (Batsch) Quél. (1886); Lepista lollbackis (Fr.) Harmaja (1974)

= Clitocybe nebularis =

Species of fungus

Clitocybe nebularis
- Mycological characteristics
- Gills on hymenium
- Cap is convex or flat
- Hymenium is decurrent
- Stipe is bare
- Spore print is cream
- Ecology is saprotrophic
- Edibility is edible

Clitocybe nebularis or Lepista nebularis, commonly known as the clouded agaric, cloudy clitocybe, or cloud funnel, is an abundant gilled fungus which appears both in conifer-dominated forests and broad-leaved woodland in Europe and North America. Appearing in Britain from mid to late autumn, it is edible, but may cause gastrointestinal issues. In 1953, Clitocybe nebularis was used by Swedish chemists Nils Löfgren, Björn Lüning, and Harry Hedström to isolate Nebularine.

== Taxonomy ==
The species was first described and named as Agaricus nebularis in 1789 by August Johann Georg Karl Batsch. It was later placed in the genus Clitocybe in 1871 by Paul Kummer as Clitocybe nebularis. After much consideration by many mycologists, over some years, when it was placed for periods in both Lepista, and Gymnopus, it was placed back in Clitocybe with the specific epithet, and 1871 accreditation it retains today.

Clitocybe nebularis var. alba Bataille (1911), differs only in having a milk white cap, and is very rare.

== Description ==
The cap of the mushroom is 5–25 centimetres (2–10 in) in diameter, convex with an incurved margin, becoming plane to depressed in shape. Cap colours are generally greyish to light brownish-grey, and often covered in a whitish bloom when young. The surface of the cap is usually dry to moist, and radially fibrillose. The gills are pale, adnate to short-decurrent, close and usually forked. The stem measures 5–10 cm (2–3 7/8 in) long and 2–4 cm wide; it is stout, swollen towards the base, becomes hollow with age, and is easily broken. It is usually somewhat lighter than the cap. The flesh is white, and very thick. It usually has a foul-smelling odour, which has been described as slightly farinaceous to spicy, or rancid.

The spores are yellow and elliptical. The spore print is light yellowish.

=== Similar species ===
The species can resemble C. robusta which has a more solid white cap, C. irina which has a pinkish spore print, Ampulloclitocybe clavipes, and Harmajaea harperi.

It may also be confused with the poisonous Entoloma sinuatum both in Europe or North America, though this species has pink sinuate gills. It also resembles Leucopaxillus albissimus and Tricholoma saponaceum. Leucopaxillus giganteus is also similar in stature, but is whiter. Infundibulicybe geotropa has a pale brown cap.

== Ecology ==
This species is host to the parasitic gilled mushroom Volvariella surrecta, which is found on older specimens.

== Edibility ==
The species is edible but even a small portion can cause gastrointestinal disturbances for some people.

== Gallery ==
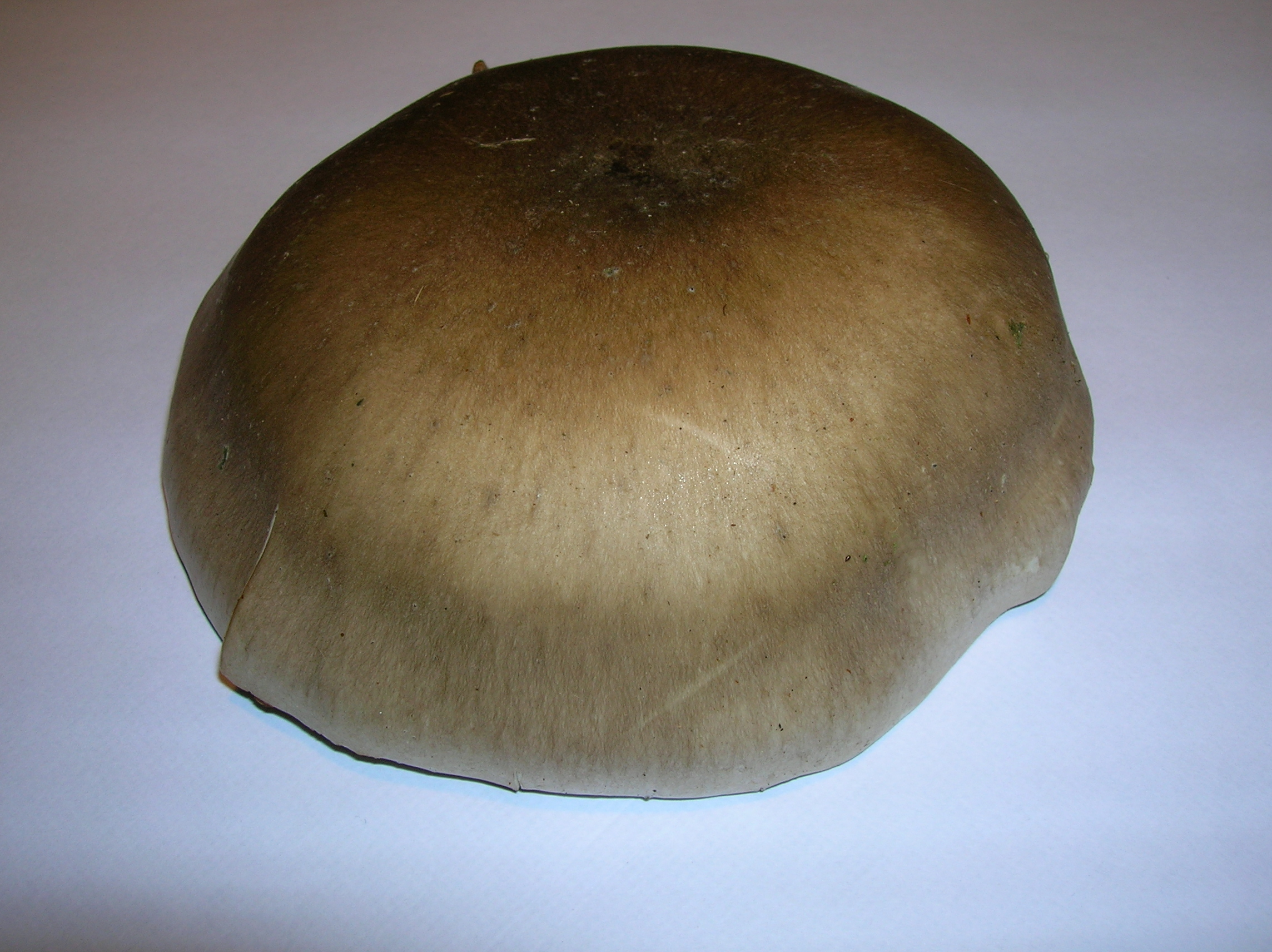
The pileus or cap

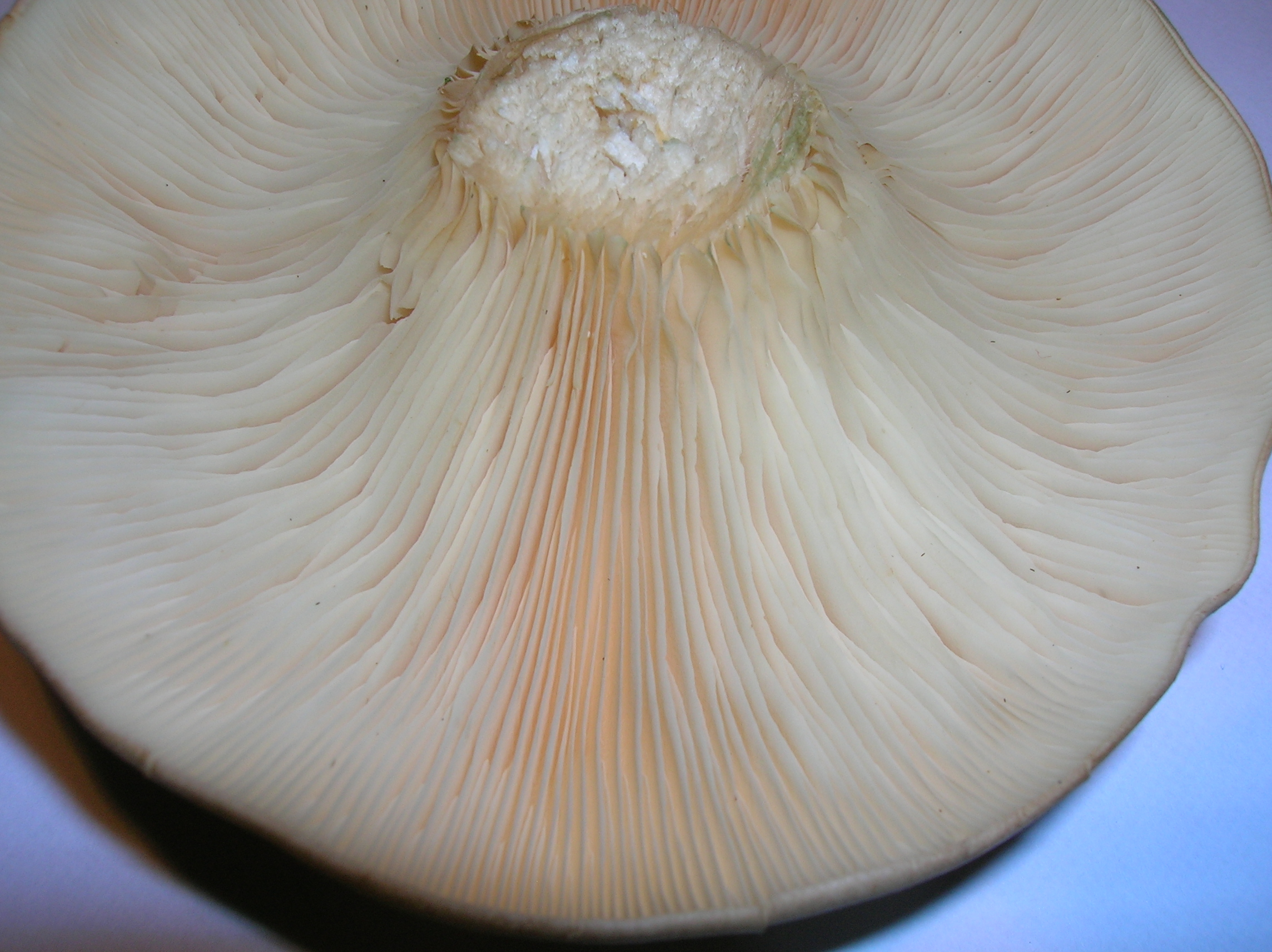
Detail of the gills

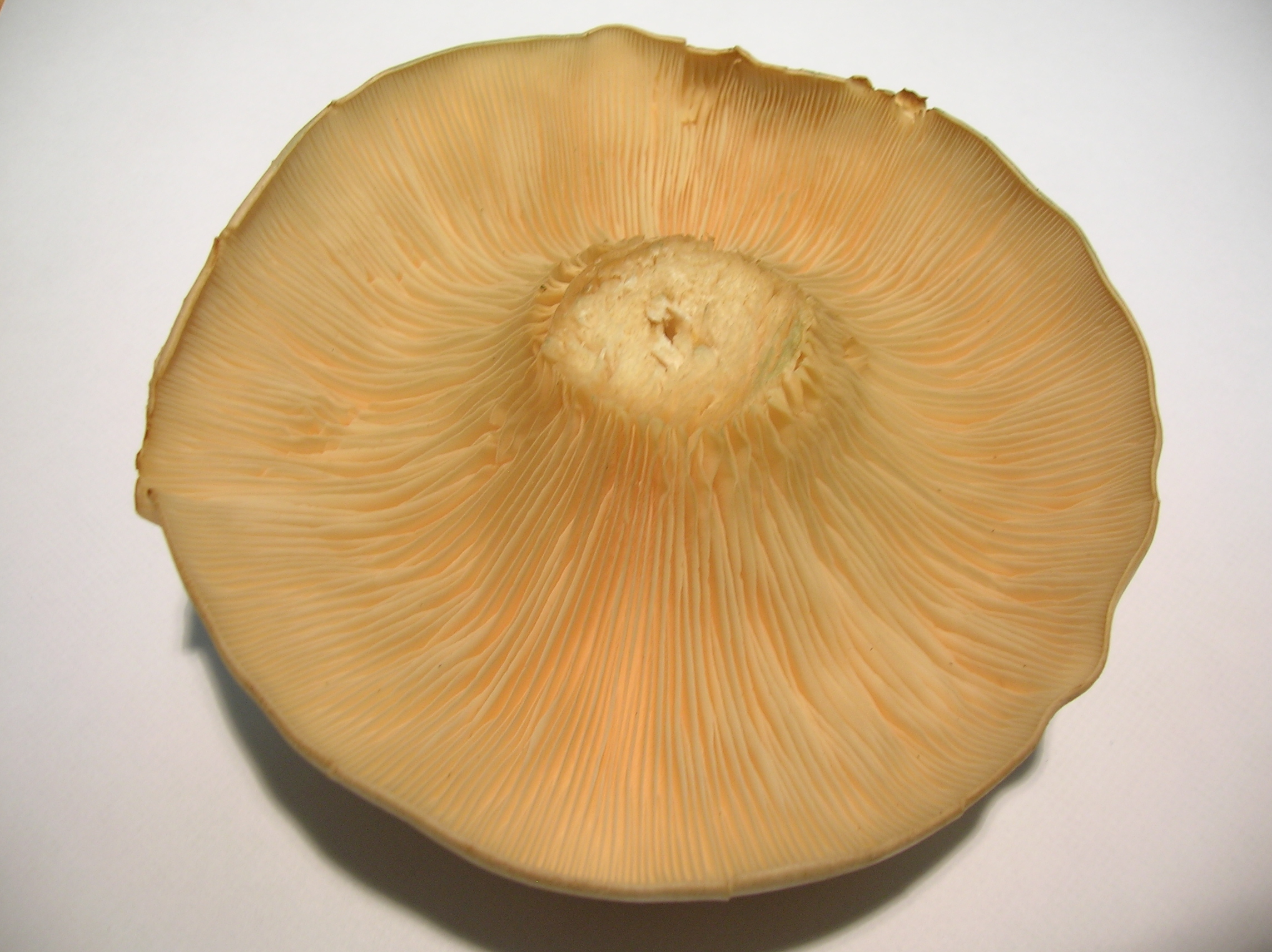
The gills and cut stipe (stalk)

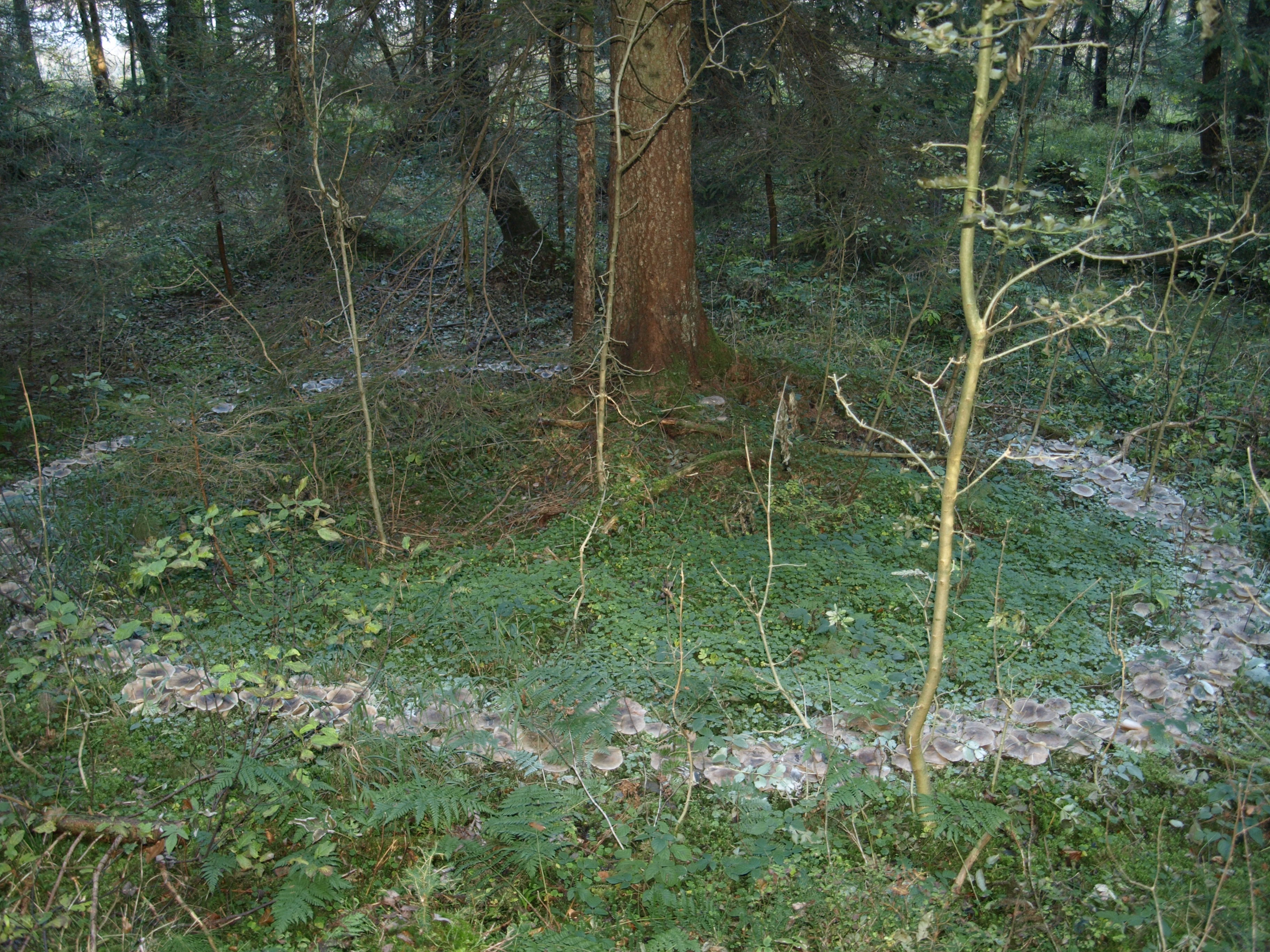
Specimen growing in a fairy ring formation

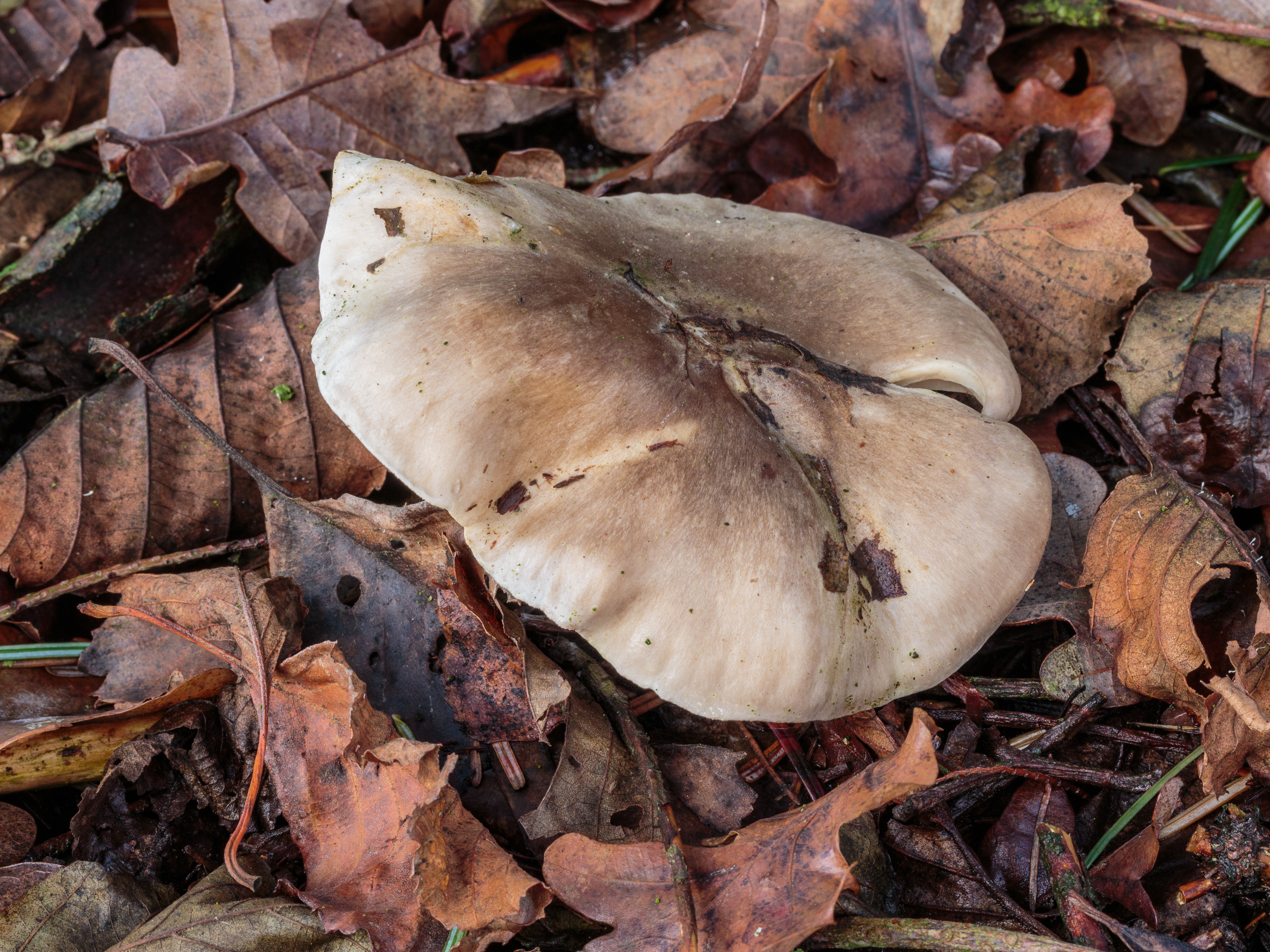
Close up of the top of a fully grown specimen

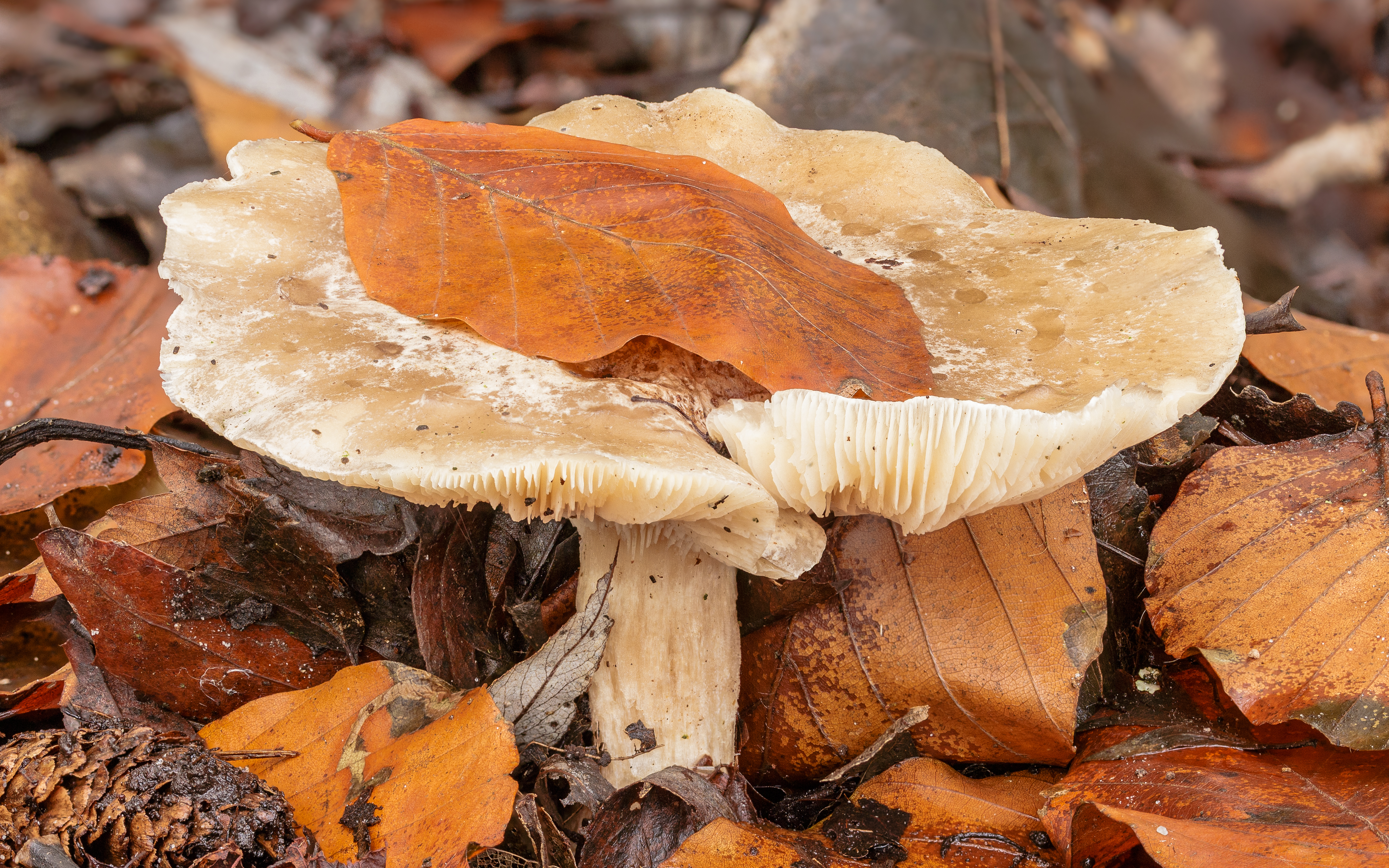
A rained-out specimen in decay
