= L. giganteus =

L. giganteus may refer to:

- Leucopaxillus giganteus, the giant leucopax, formerly the giant clitocybe or the giant funnel, a saprobic fungus species
- Losillasaurus giganteus, a sauropod dinosaur species from the Jurassic-Cretaceous boundary in the southeast of Spain
