= Nils Löfgren =

Swedish chemist

- Born: August 18, 1913
- Died: January 21, 1967 (aged 53)

Nils Magnus Löfgren (18 August 1913 – 21 January 1967) was a Swedish chemist who developed the anesthetic Lidocaine (under the name Xylocaine) in 1943 and isolated the purine nucleoside antibiotic nebularine in 1953.

At the time Löfgren developed Lidocaine, he had recently finished his licentiate degree and was teaching organic chemistry at the Stockholm University. He and his co-worker Bengt Lundqvist sold the rights to Xylocaine to the Swedish pharmaceutical company Astra AB. In 1948, Löfgren completed his doctorate, and the title of his dissertation was Studies on local anesthetics: Xylocaine: a new synthetic drug. He later became professor of organic chemistry at the Stockholm University.

In 1953, alongside another Swedish chemist, Björn Lüning, and Swedish veterinary bacteriologist Harry Hedström, Löfgren successfully isolated nebularine from the Clitobyde nebularis fungus.
