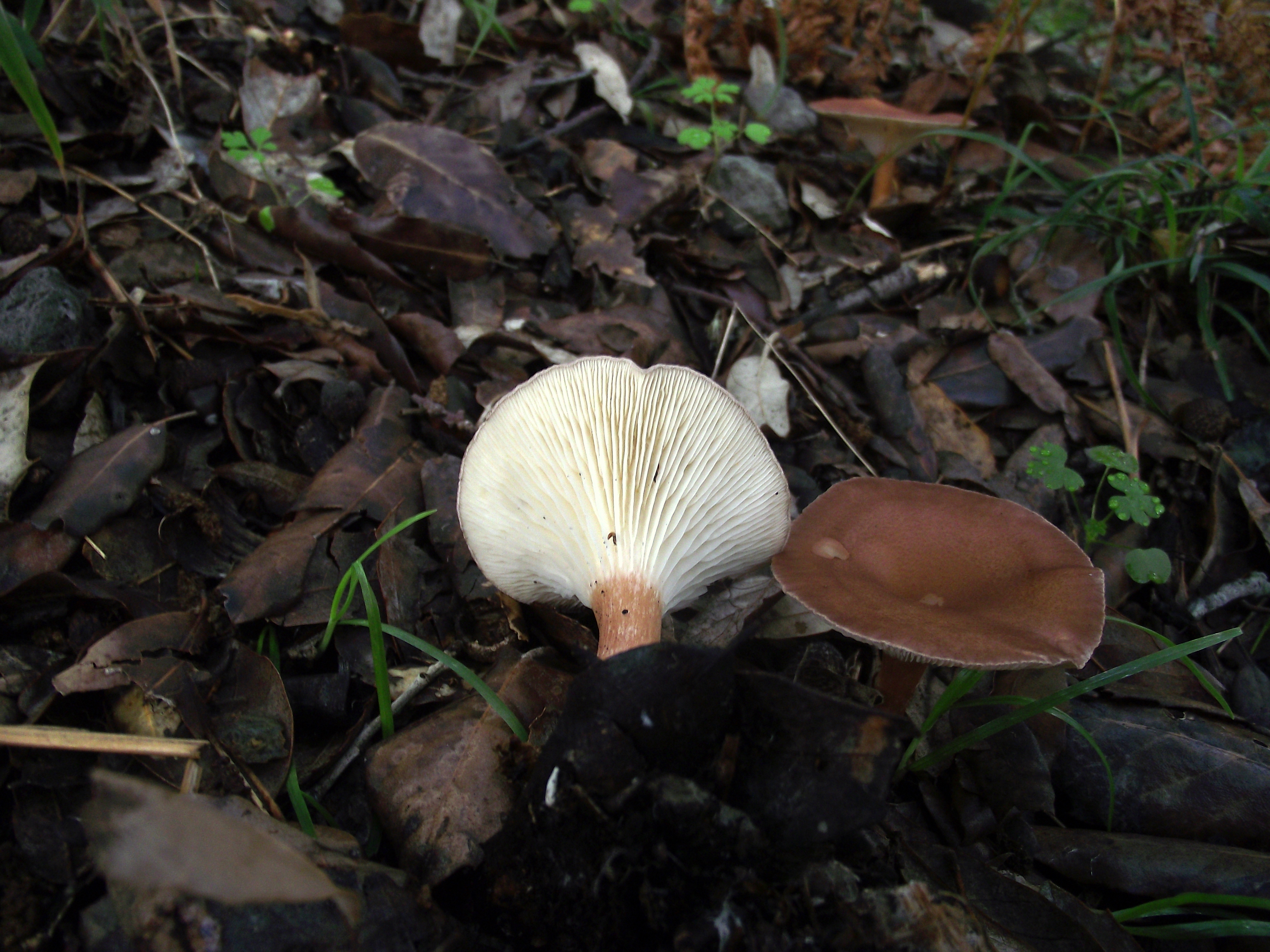

Scientific classification
- Domain: Eukaryota
- Kingdom: Fungi
- Division: Basidiomycota
- Class: Agaricomycetes
- Order: Agaricales
- Family: incertae sedis
- Genus: Infundibulicybe
- Species: I. mediterranea

Binomial name
- Infundibulicybe mediterranea Vizzini, Contu & Musumeci (2011)

= Infundibulicybe mediterranea =

Species of mushroom-forming fungus

Infundibulicybe mediterranea is a species of mushroom-forming fungus that was first scientifically described in 2011. It is characterized by its funnel-shaped, dark chestnut to brown cap, white decurrent gills, and tear-shaped spores that contain several oil droplets. This edible fungus grows on leaf litter and humus beneath broadleaf trees, especially cork oak and holm oak, often forming arc patterns or small tufts. Originally found in Sardinia (Italy), it has been recorded across the Mediterranean region including southern France, Corsica, Morocco, and Cyprus.

== Taxonomy ==
Infundibulicybe mediterranea was formally introduced by Vizzini, Contu and Musumeci in 2011. Molecular analysis of the internal transcribed spacer (ITS) region confirmed that it forms a distinct lineage sister to other I. gibba sequences. The specific epithet mediterranea honours its Mediterranean provenance. The holotype (TO HG1999) was collected on 16 November 2009 under Quercus suber (cork oak) at Abbafritta, near Aggius in northern Sardinia.

== Description ==
The fruit body of I. mediterranea has a funnel‑shaped cap (pileus) 1–8 cm broad. Initially the cap surface is flat with a shallow central depression and a small umbo, becoming deeply infundibuliform (funnel‑shaped) with maturity; it is dry, lightly fibrillose to almost smooth, and varies from dark chestnut to paler brown tones as it ages. The gills (lamellae) are crowded, run down the stipe (decurrent) and are white.

The stipe measures 1.5–5 cm long and 0.3–0.5 cm thick, is cylindrical or slightly swollen at the base, pruinose when fresh and the same colour as (or slightly paler than) the cap. Initially stuffed, it becomes hollow with age, often retaining a tomentose base with adhering debris. The flesh is thin, elastic and white, showing no colour change on exposure. The odour and taste are mild and non‑distinctive; the species is reported as edible. The spore print is white.

Microscopically, spores are tear‑shaped (lacrymoid), hyaline, smooth, 4.5–6 by 3–4 micrometres (μm), inamyloid, and contain several oil droplets. Basidia (spore-bearing cells) are club‑shaped, four‑spored, 20–25 by 6–7.5 μm, often with a slight ventral constriction. No cystidia are present. The cap cuticle (pileipellis) is a xerocutis composed of loosely interwoven, protruding hyphae encrusted with brown pigment, 3–16 μm wide. Clamp connections occur at most septa.

== Habitat and distribution ==
Infundibulicybe mediterranea grows scattered or in groups (gregariously), frequently in arc formations or in small tufts on leaf litter and humus beneath broadleaf trees, especially Quercus suber and Quercus ilex (holm oak). Fruit bodies have been recorded from February through December. Apart from its core distribution in Sardinia, it has also been reported from southern France, Corsica, and Morocco. In Cyprus, it has been recorded from high-elevation forests of Pinus nigra subsp. pallasiana and in meso- and supra-Mediterranean P. brutia forests.
