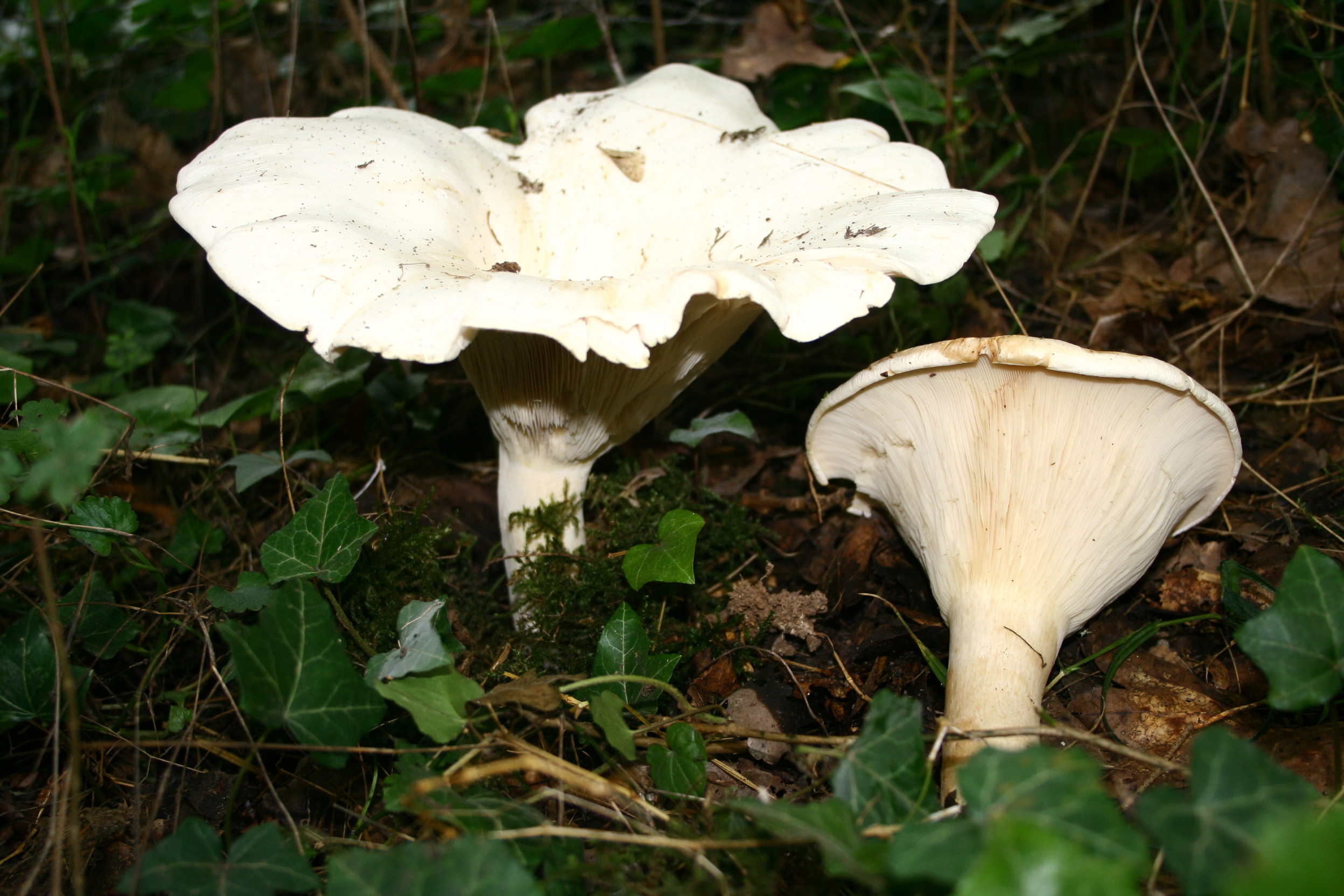

Scientific classification
- Kingdom: Fungi
- Division: Basidiomycota
- Class: Agaricomycetes
- Order: Agaricales
- Family: Pseudoclitocybaceae
- Genus: Aspropaxillus
- Species: A. giganteus

Binomial name
- Aspropaxillus giganteus (Sowerby) Kühner & Maire (1934)

Synonyms
- List: Agaricus giganteus Sowerby (1799); Clitocybe gigantea (Sowerby) Quél. (1872); Paxillus giganteus (Sowerby) Fr. (1874); Omphalia geotropa var. gigantea (Sowerby) Quél. (1886); Leucopaxillus giganteus (Sowerby) Singer (1939); Clitocybe candida Bres. (1882); Leucopaxillus candidus (Bres.) Singer (1939); Aspropaxillus candidus (Bres.) M.M. Moser (1953); Leucopaxillus septentrionalis Singer & A.H. Sm. (1948); Clitocybe septentrionalis (Singer & A.H. Sm.) H.E. Bigelow (1959); Aspropaxillus septentrionalis (Singer & A.H. Sm.) Vizzini (2012)

= Aspropaxillus giganteus =

Species of fungus

Aspropaxillus giganteus
- Mycological characteristics
- Gills on hymenium
- Cap is infundibuliform or flat
- Hymenium is decurrent
- Stipe is bare
- Spore print is white
- Ecology is saprotrophic
- Edibility is choice or edible, but unpalatable

Aspropaxillus giganteus is a saprobic species of fungus in the order Agaricales. As its name implies, the fruit body, or mushroom, can become quite large—the cap reaches diameters of up to 50 cm (20 in). It has a white or pale cream cap, and is funnel-shaped when mature, with the gills running down the length of the stem.

The species has a cosmopolitan distribution and is typically found growing in groups or rings in grassy pastures, roadside hedges, or woodland clearings. It is considered by some to be a choice edible when young, and has been shown to contain a bioactive compound with antibiotic properties.

== Taxonomy ==
The species was first described as Agaricus giganteus by English naturalist James Sowerby in 1809, who illustrated it in his book Coloured Figures of English Fungi. Other historical synonyms include Clitocybe gigantea (Quélet, 1872), Paxillus giganteus (Fries, 1874), and Omphalia geotropa var. gigantea (Quélet, 1886). In 1934, Robert Kühner and Réné Maire created the genus Aspropaxillus to contain species of Leucopaxillus with smooth spores, and they set L. giganteus as its type species. American mycologist Rolf Singer transferred it to genus Leucopaxillus in 1938, but recognized the value of maintaining a distinction of the smooth-spored species, and so made L. giganteus the type species of section Aspropaxilli. In 2012, Vizzini et al. showed that Leucopaxillus in its then-current definition was polyphyletic. Part of this discovery was that Leucopaxillus giganteus does not belong to the core clade of Leucopaxillus. As a result, Leucopaxillus giganteus was moved back to genus Aspropaxillus.

Aspropaxillus candidus was described as somewhat resembling A. giganteus yet having a darker coloring and being found more commonly in montane regions. as well as that A. candidus tends to be smaller, with a cap diameter ranging from 6 to 30 cm (2.4 to 11.8 in) broad. Aspropaxillus candidus is conspecific with Aspropaxillus giganteus.

Aspropaxillus septentrionalis was described as while being also large and resembling A. giganteus at some points during its development yet being distinguished by its nauseous odor, the tan color of the cap, and the adnate (gill squarely attached to the stem) to slightly adnexed (narrowly attached) gills. Aspropaxillus septentrionalis is conspecific with Aspropaxillus giganteus.

Aspropaxillus giganteus is commonly known as the 'giant funnel', the 'giant leucopax' or the 'giant clitocybe'.

== Description ==
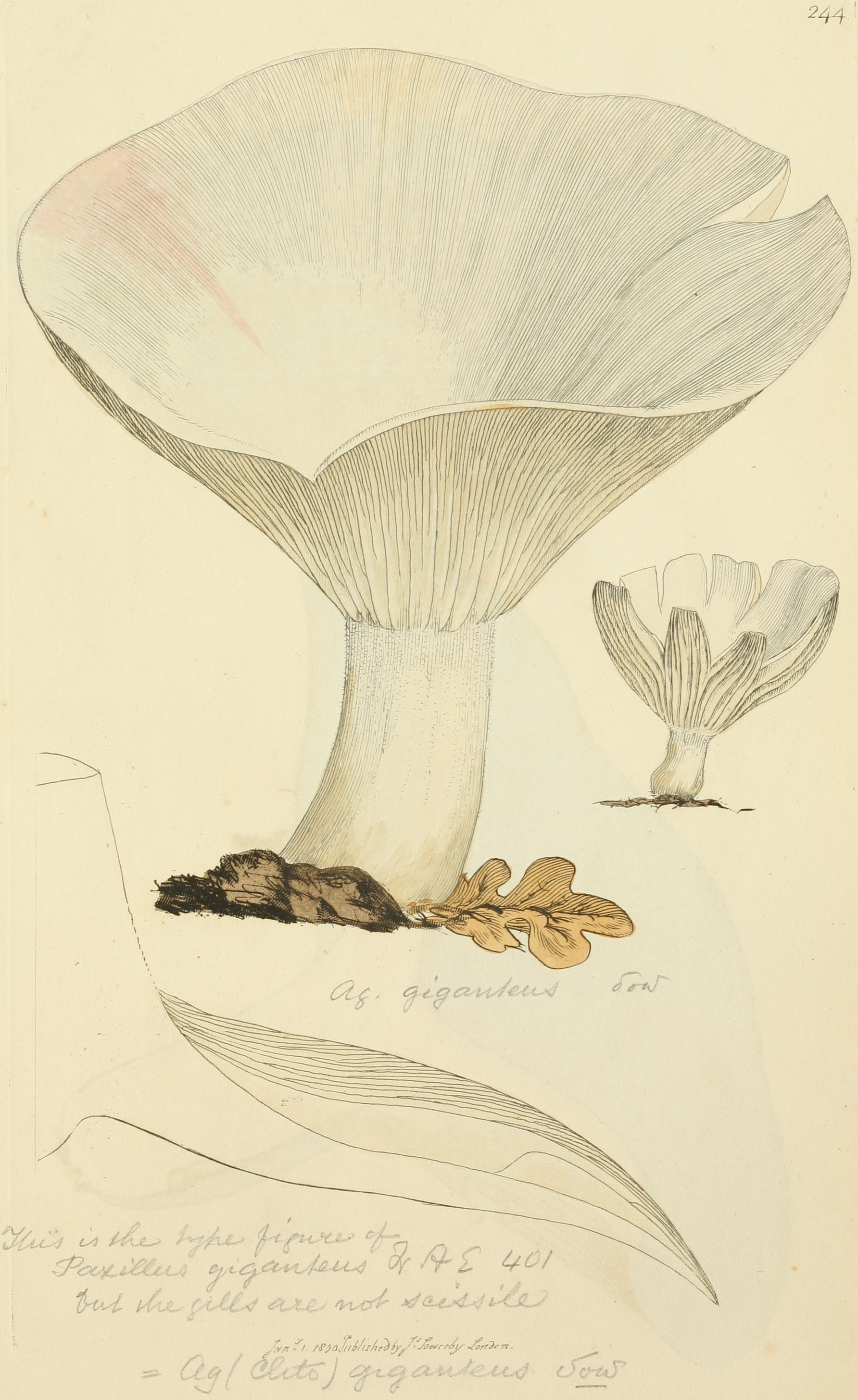
Illustration of the type figure of A. giganteus (originally Agaricus giganteus) (1803)

The cap can become rather large, ranging from 10–50 cm (3.9–19.7 in), rarely even 70 cm (28 in) in diameter with a thickness of 1 to 1.4 cm (0.4 to 0.6 in) at half the radius. The cap is initially convex with an inrolled margin, then flattens out and becomes shallowly funnel-shaped. The cap is smooth and creamy white in color, but may develop brown stains and circular cracks with age.

The cream-colored gills are narrow, crowded close together, and have a decurrent attachment—running down the length of the stem; in age the gills will darken to a buff color. The stem is off-white with reddish-brown fibers and has dimensions, when mature, of 3 to 10 cm (1.2 to 3.9 in) tall and 2 to 5 cm (0.8 to 2.0 in) thick. There is no ring on the stem. At the base of the stem there is typically a dense, white mycelium that may form a mat. The flesh is firm, and also is white. Mature specimens are fragile, and difficult to remove from the ground without breaking.

=== Microscopic characteristics ===
When viewed in deposit, such as with a spore print, the spores appear white. When viewed with a light microscope, the spores are ovoid to ellipsoid, translucent (hyaline), have a smooth surface, and possess a broadly rounded apex and base; the spore dimensions are 6–8 by 3.5–5 μm. The spores of A. giganteus are amyloid—meaning that they will absorb iodine when stained with Melzer's reagent—however, the extent of the stain may be variable. The spore-bearing cells, the basidia, are 25–40 by 4.5–8 μm, narrowly club-shaped, and are attached to either 2 or 4 spores. The hyphae of this species invariably have clamp connections.

=== Similar species ===
Leucopaxillus albissimus, Leucopaxillus gentianeus, Lactifluus vellereus, and Infundibulicybe gibba have been suggested as lookalike species. Young specimens of A. giganteus may be confused with Lepista irina, Clitocybe praemagna or C. robusta. White Lactarius and Russula species may also appear superficially similar, but they have brittle flesh that breaks cleanly, unlike the fibrous flesh of A. giganteus.

== Habitat and distribution ==
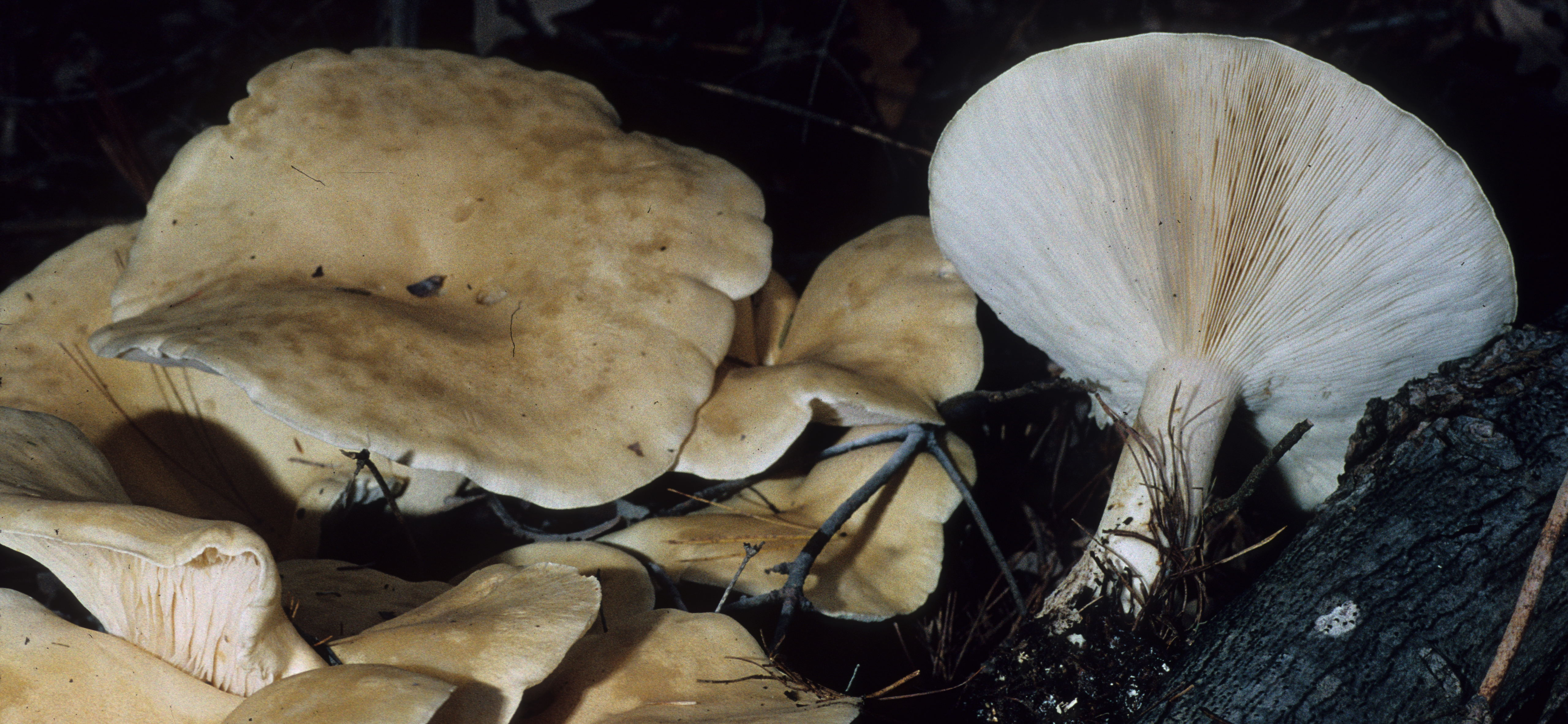
These mature specimens have brown stains on the cap.

Aspropaxillus giganteus can form fairy rings in grassy areas like pastures, and is also found along roadsides; it produces fruiting bodies in summer and autumn. It is a saprobic species, and so derives nutrients by decomposing organic matter.

The fungus has a cosmopolitan distribution, and occurs throughout the temperate zone of the northern hemisphere. It is found in North America, Britain, and Europe. David Arora reports that in North America, it is most common in the Pacific Northwest and the Rocky Mountains.

== Edibility ==
=== Consumption soundness ===
It is described as "edible" or "nonpoisonous" by various sources. It is described that "[o]ccasionally consumption results in stomach cramps and diarrhea" by Hall et al. (2003).

=== Palatability ===
It is a "choice edible mushroom when young", as described by Schalkwijk-Barendsen (1991). It "can be mild and pleasant but is sometimes truly disgusting", said Hall et al. (2003). It is "with poor flavor", as recorded by Miller and Miller (2006). It has "a pleasant mealy odor and a good, sweet taste", as noticed by Ribeiro et al. (2008). It "has delicate aroma and tender texture", as denoted by Liu et al. (2019).

=== Other aspects ===
The odor has been said to be farinaceous or similar to fish meal.

Burrows suggests preparing specimens by cutting them up and boiling the pieces, and disposing of the water; then they may be used in dishes such as stews and casseroles. Because of its large size, one specimen can be enough to be consumed by several individuals.

The species is also a favorite food for species of the fruit fly genus Drosophila.

== Bioactive compounds ==
Aspropaxillus giganteus contains a bioactive compound named clitocine that has antibiotic activity against a number of bacteria that are pathogenic to humans, such as Bacillus cereus and Bacillus subtilis; an earlier (1945) study showed antibiotic activity against Mycobacterium tuberculosis, Salmonella typhi, and Brucea abortus. Clitocine has also been shown to promote apoptosis (cell death) in human cervical cancer cells in vitro (HeLa). The mycelia of A. giganteus, when grown in liquid culture, has been shown to produce phenols and flavonoids that have antioxidant activity.
