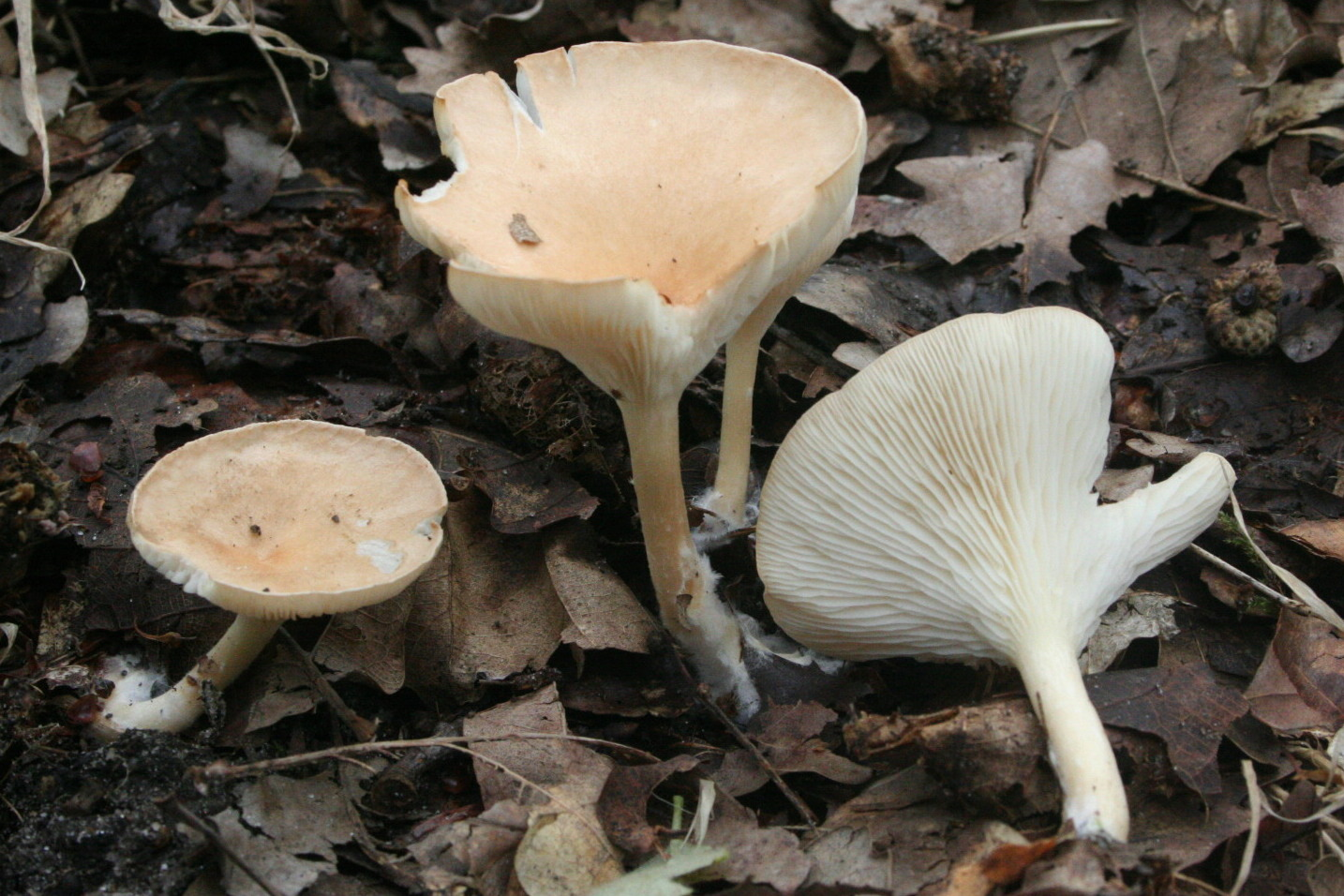

Scientific classification
- Domain: Eukaryota
- Kingdom: Fungi
- Division: Basidiomycota
- Class: Agaricomycetes
- Order: Agaricales
- Family: incertae sedis
- Genus: Infundibulicybe
- Species: I. gibba

Binomial name
- Infundibulicybe gibba (Pers.) Harmaja (2003)

Synonyms
- Agaricus gibbus Pers. (1801); Clitocybe gibba (Pers.) P. Kumm. (1871); Agaricus maximus P.Gaertn., B.Mey. & Scherb. (1802)

= Infundibulicybe gibba =

Species of gilled mushroom

Infundibulicybe gibba Mycological characteristics
- Gills on hymenium
- Cap is infundibuliform
- Hymenium is decurrent
- Stipe is bare
- Spore print is white
- Ecology is saprotrophic
- Edibility is edible but not recommended

Infundibulicybe gibba (also known as Clitocybe gibba), and commonly known as the common funnel or funnel cap, is a species of gilled mushroom which is common in European woods.

== Taxonomy ==
The epithet gibba comes from the Latin adjective "gibbus", meaning "humped" or "gibbous".

This species was originally described by the mycologist Christiaan Hendrik Persoon in 1801 as Agaricus gibbus, at a time when gilled mushrooms were generally all assigned to genus Agaricus. In 1871, Paul Kummer allocated the species to the genus Clitocybe, which previously (according to the system of Elias Magnus Fries) had only been a tribe within genus Agaricus.

In 2003 Harri Harmaja created the new genus Infundibulicybe for some of the larger members of the former Clitocybe and he included I. gibba as the type species.

=== Clitocybe catinus ===
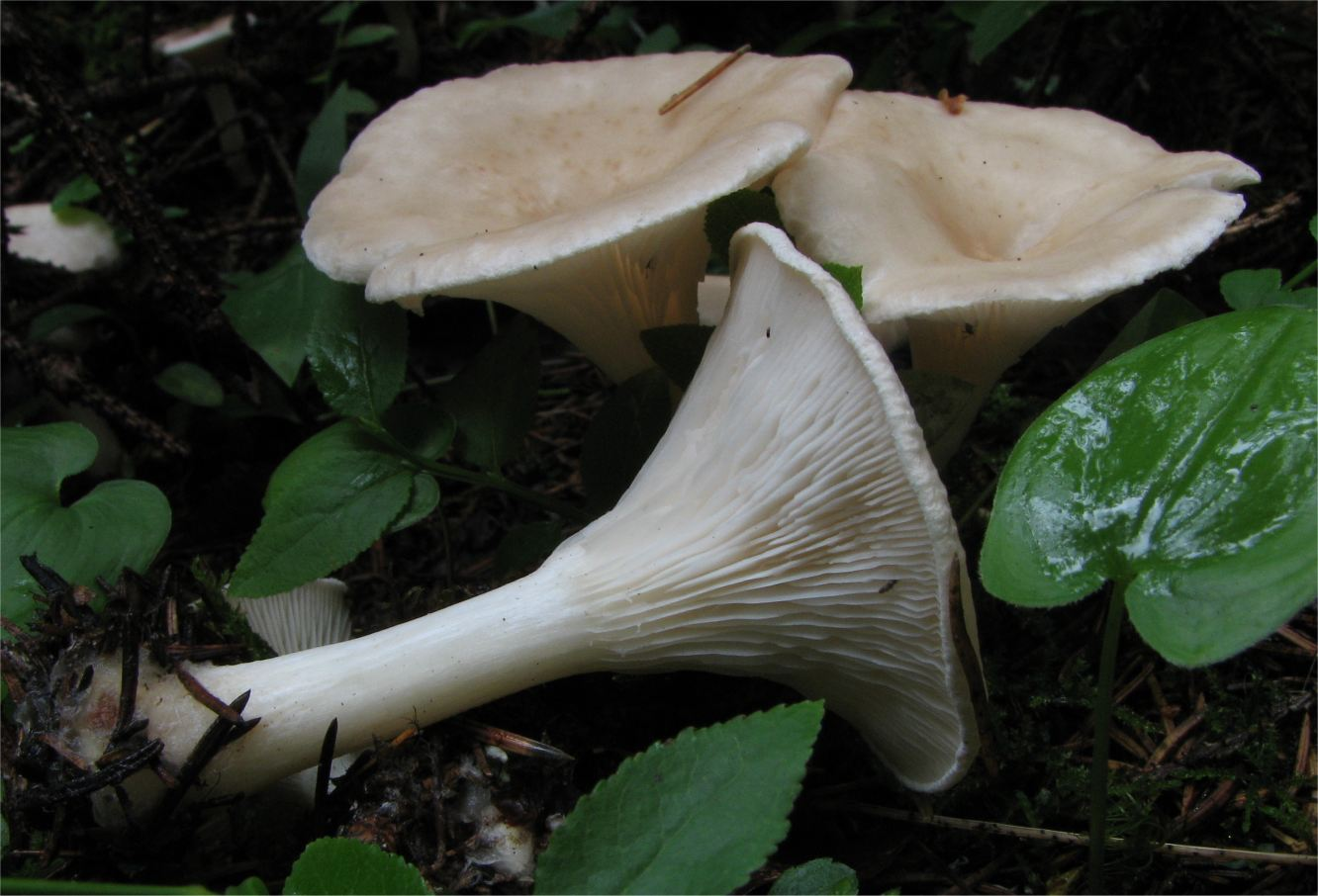
Infundibulicybe catinus

Clitocybe catinus is described as differing from C. gibba by having white cap with occasionally some pink tonality and its slight smell of flour.

Harmaja (2003) gave it a new name, Infundibulicybe catinus.

Vizzini et al. (2011) listed it a color variant of Infundibulicybe gibba.

=== Clitocybe infundibuliformis ===
The older name Clitocybe infundibuliformis is often identified as a synonym of I. gibba, but according to Species Fungorum that use was incorrect and the original C. infundibuliformis was a different taxon.

=== Etymology ===
The name infundibuliformis derives from the Latin "infundibulum", a funnel, with the suffix "-formis" - so it means "funnel-shaped".

== Description ==
The matt slightly felted cap grows from about 3 to 9 centimetres (1 1/4 to 3 1/2 in), and is beige to tan, also sometimes with a pink tinge. It may have a small depression in the centre and soon becomes funnel-shaped.

There is no ring or other veil remnant. The stem is white or whitish and about 2–8 cm long and 1 cm in diameter.

The white gills are crowded and very decurrent (running down the stem).

It has a faint "cyanic" smell, like new-mown hay, and the flavour is mild, but the central European variety adstringens has an unpleasant taste.

The tear-shaped spores are white and around 5.5–8 μm by 4–5 μm. The spore print is white.

=== Similar species ===
The species resembles Infundibulicybe squamulosa, Pseudoclitocybe cyathiformis, Bonomyces sinopicus, and Singerocybe adirondackensis.

== Distribution and habitat ==
This gregarious saprobic mushroom grows on soil in deciduous or (less commonly) coniferous woods and may be found from summer to autumn. It sometimes forms fairy rings.

It is very common throughout Europe, and occurs in North America and Japan.

== Uses ==
It is edible when young, but said to be of mediocre quality. It can be fried or used in risottos or soups etc. The stems are tough and may be discarded. The species resembles some which are poisonous.

An extract of I. gibba exhibits inhibitory activity on thrombin.
