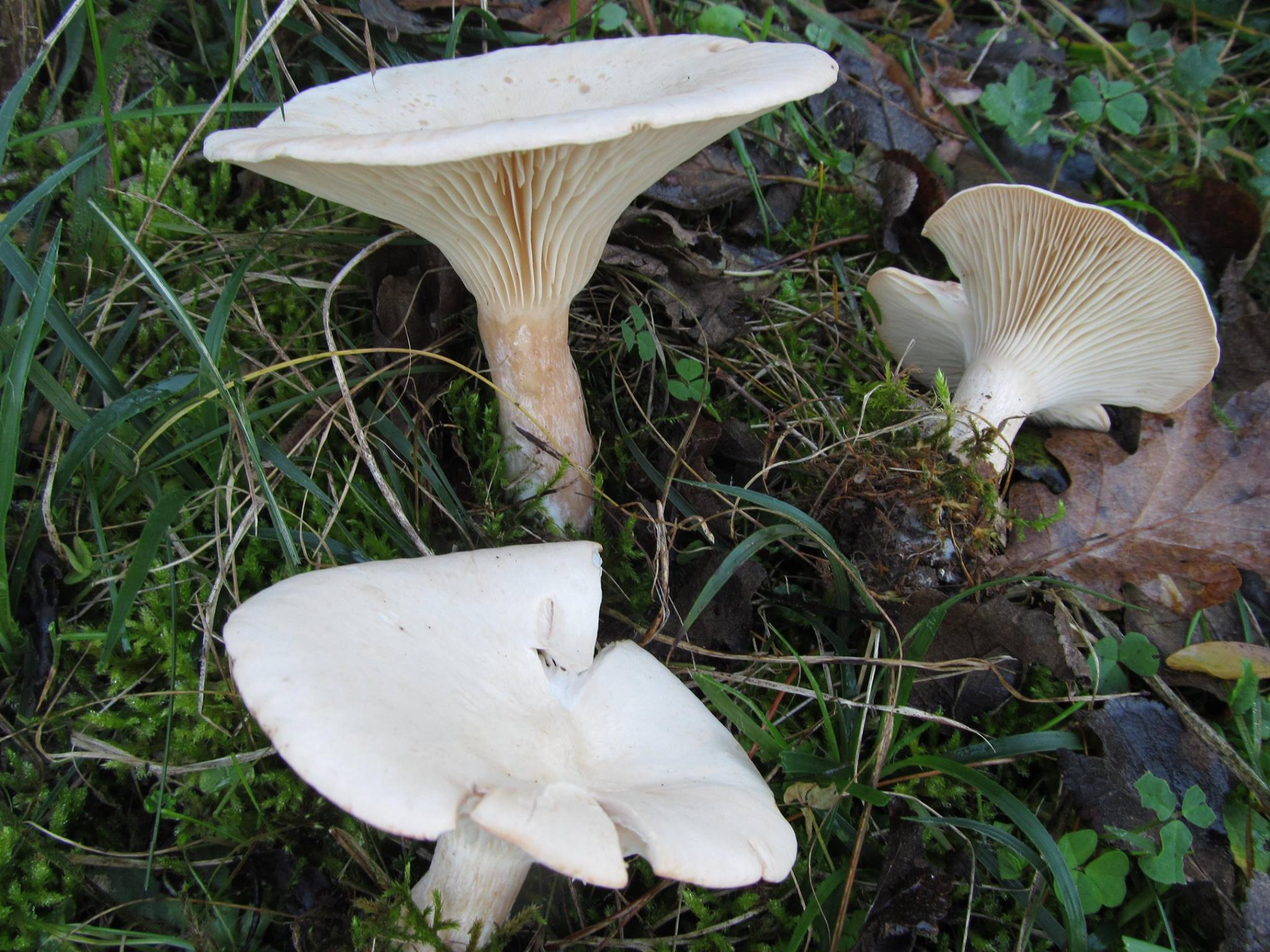
- Infundibulicybe geotropa

Scientific classification
- Domain: Eukaryota
- Kingdom: Fungi
- Division: Basidiomycota
- Class: Agaricomycetes
- Order: Agaricales
- Family: incertae sedis
- Genus: Infundibulicybe; Harmaja (2003)

Type species
- Infundibulicybe gibba (Pers.) Harmaja (2003)

Species
- 20, see text

= Infundibulicybe =

Genus of fungi

Infundibulicybe is a genus of fungi that is robustly placed incertae sedis as sister group to the Tricholomatoid clade. It has previously been part of the family of Tricholomataceae, but recent molecular phylogeny has shown it to take an isolated position within the Agaricales.

== Description ==
The fruitingbody of Infundibulicybe is clitocyboid and not hygrophanous. The cap diameter can vary from 1,5 to 25 cm, with some growing as large as 40 cm. Its shape can be depressed to funnel-like with a velvety to finely scaly surface. The colouration of the basidiocarp is white to pale buff to buff, pinkish buff, yellowish, yellowish brown, orange brown, reddish brown or greyish brown. The gills are decurrent to deeply decurrent. This basidiomycete smells faint, from cyanic to sweet aromatic and faintly camphor-like when fresh. The spore deposit is whitish and spores are dikaryoid, smooth, hyaline and without iodine reactions. The basidia are 4-spored, cheilocystidia are absent and clamp connections present. They grow saprotrophic on litter of leaves and needles or soil in forests, grassland and alpine habitats.

Infundibulicybe shares some characteristics with Omphalina, like the cream-reddish brown tinges of pileus and stipe, the deeply decurrent lamellae and strongly encrusting pigment. Another member of the group, I. lateritia is a rare alpine-arctic species strictly associated with Dryas octopetala (Rosaceae).

== Taxonomy ==
- - Infundibulicybe
  - - Lyophyllaceae
    - - Entolomataceae
      - Tricholomataceae

Agaricales Phylogeny

The group was formerly included in the genus Clitocybe, but in 2003 was erected to genus level to accommodate species for which mycelium cannot reduce nitrate and basidiospores do not adhere in tetrads, but exhibit a lacrymoid (tear-shaped) morphology, a confluent base and a cyanophobic basidiospore wall. The genus contains 19 widespread species according to the Index Fungorum and one new species I. rufa, only known from high altitude localities in southwestern China, described in 2016.

The type species of the genus, as defined by the author Harmaja, is I. gibba.

== Species ==
- I. alkaliviolascens
- I. altaica
- I. bresadolana
- I. catinus
- I. costata
- I. dryadum
- I. geotropa
- I. gibba
- I. gigas
- I. glareosa
- I. lapponica
- I. lateritia
- I. mediterranea
- I. meridionalis
- I. montana
- I. rufa
- I. sinopicoides
- I. splendoides
- I. squamulosa
- I. trulliformis

== See also ==
- List of Tricholomataceae genera
