= Nebularine =

Naturally occurring purine nucleoside

- Molecular structure of nebularine

Names
- IUPAC name (2R,3S,4R,5R)-2-(hydroxymethyl)-5-purin-9-yloxolane-3,4-diol

Identifiers
CAS Number	550-33-4
3D model (JSmol)	Interactive image
ChEBI	CHEBI:18255
ChEMBL	ChEMBL1399702
ChemSpider	61656
DrugBank	DB04440
ECHA InfoCard	100.008.166
EC Number	208-981-9
KEGG	C01736
PubChem CID	68368
UNII	B8B604PS4P
CompTox Dashboard (EPA)	DTXSID701015580
- InChI: InChI=1S/C10H12N4O4/c15-2-6-7(16)8(17)10(18-6)14-4-13-5-1-11-3-12-9(5)14/h1,3-4,6-8,10,15-17H,2H2/t6-,7-,8-,10-/m1/s1 Key: MRWXACSTFXYYMV-FDDDBJFASA-N
- SMILES: C1=C2C(=NC=N1)N(C=N2)[C@H]3[C@@H]([C@@H]([C@H](O3)CO)O)O

Properties
Chemical formula	C_{10}H_{12}N_{4}O_{4}
Molar mass	252.230 g·mol^{−1}
- Except where otherwise noted, data are given for materials in their standard state (at 25 °C [77 °F], 100 kPa). Infobox references

Nebularine is an organic compound with the chemical formula C_{10}H_{12}N_{4}O_{4}, belonging to the purine family. In biochemical nomenclature, the short abbreviation symbol for nebularine is P. It is a ribonucleoside, with adenosine as its precursor.

== Origins ==
In 1953, Swedish chemists Nils Löfgren and Björn Lüning, alongside veterinary bacteriologist Harry Hedström isolated nebularine from a secondary metabolite of the fungus Clitocybe nebularis, from which nebularine gets its name. Subsequently, it was also found in the bacterium Streptomyces yokosukanensis and certain mesophilic bacteria of the Microbispora genus. Since the amount of nebularine in the fungus is too low to allow for sufficient extraction via mycelial culture, the compound is produced biotechnologically from the bacterium S. yokosukanensis or by chemical synthesis.

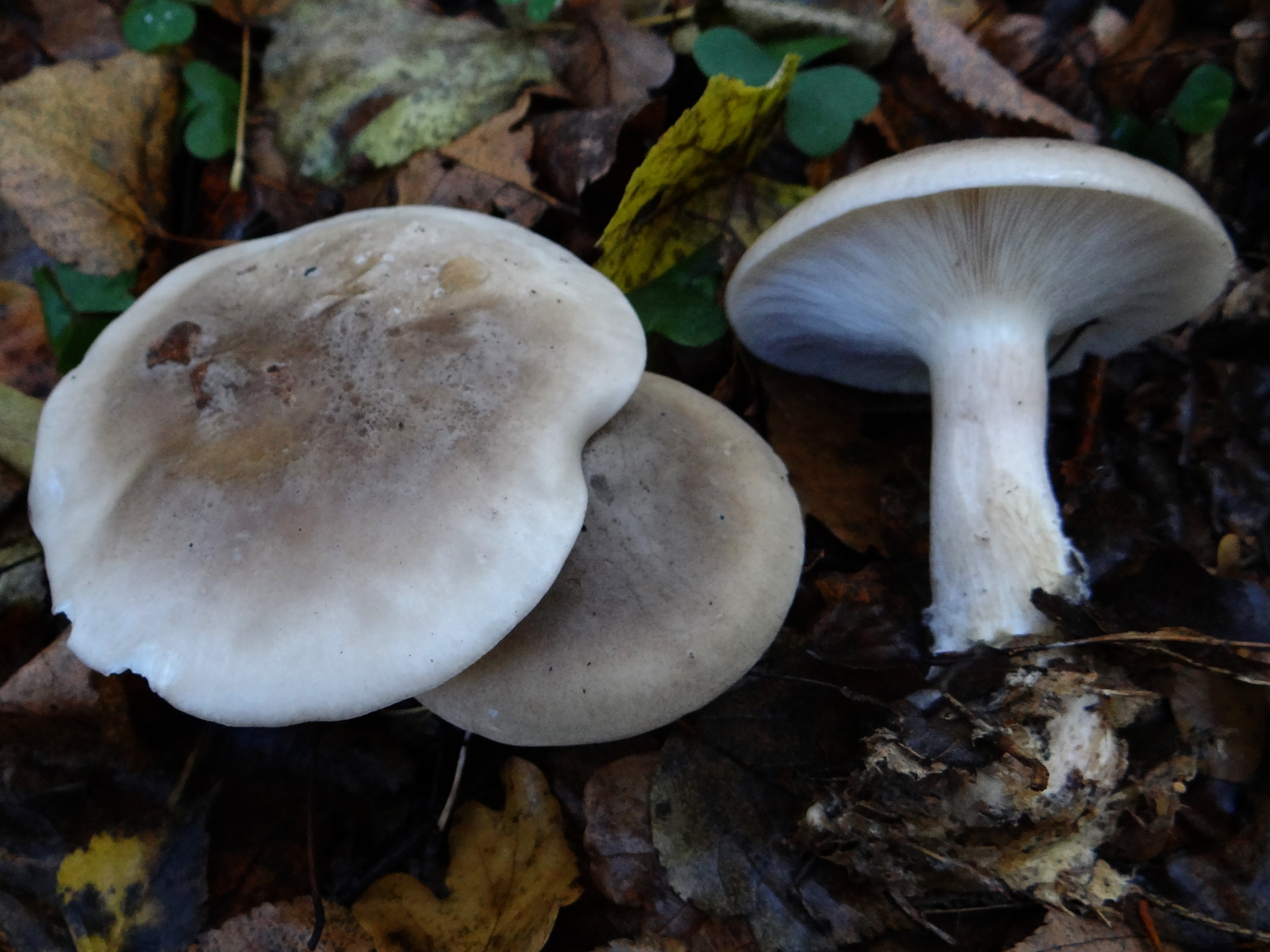
Clitocybe nebularis

== Properties ==
Nebularine exhibits antiviral activity against influenza B; antibiotic activity against bacteria of the genera Mycobacterium and Brucella melitensis; antiparasitic activity against Entamoeba histolytica and Schistosoma mansoni; and oncoststic activity. It also has moderate antifungal activity.

Nebularine also has a very strong inhibitory effect on the growth of wheat, lettuce, spinach, and carrot seedlings. It is a potent antagonist of cytokinin activity, as demonstrated by biological assays on Amaranthus and leaf senescence. It has also been shown to be a noncompetitive inhibitor of xanthine oxidase.
