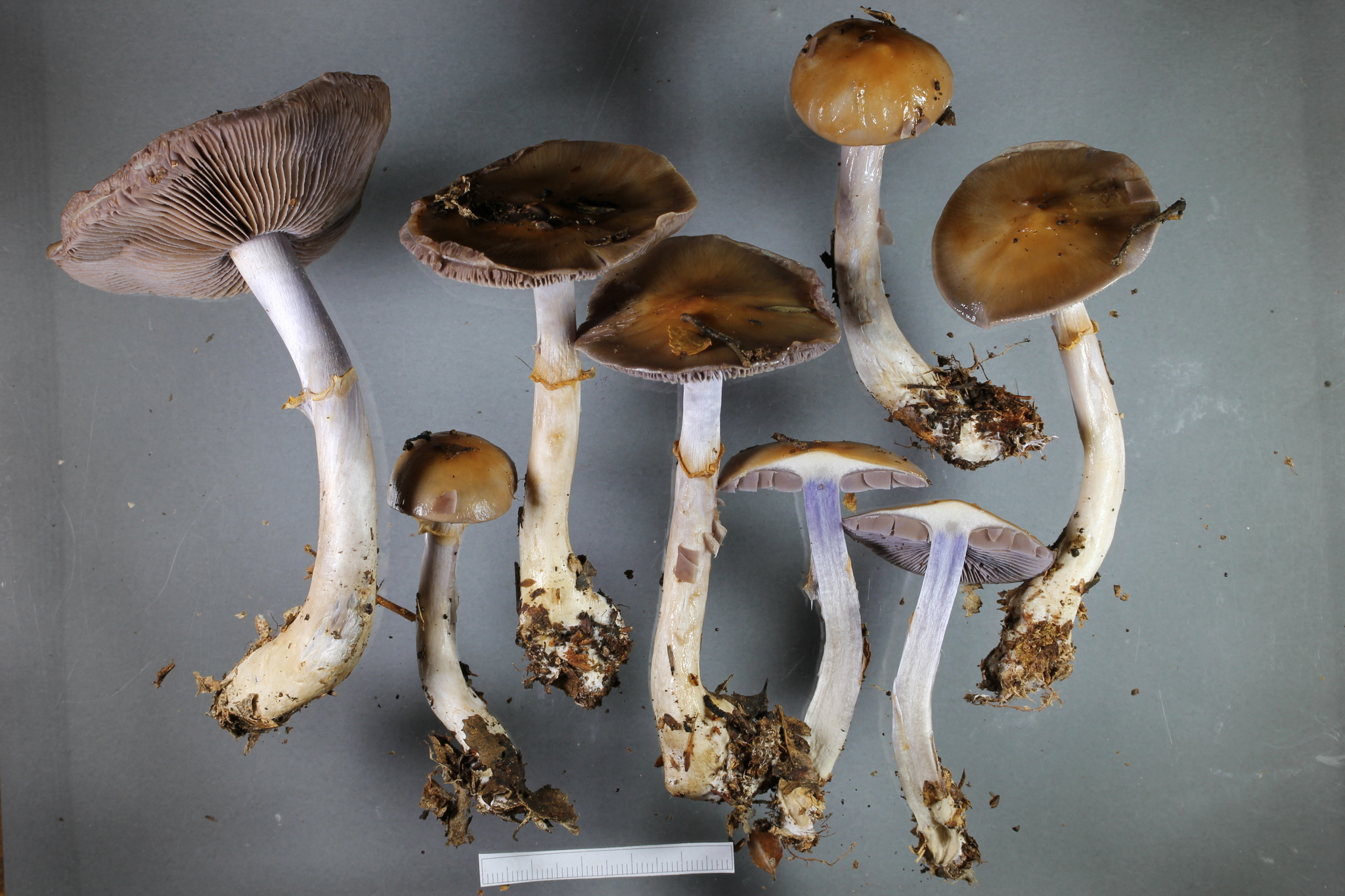

Scientific classification
- Kingdom: Fungi
- Division: Basidiomycota
- Class: Agaricomycetes
- Order: Agaricales
- Family: Cortinariaceae
- Genus: Cortinarius
- Species: C. bellus

Binomial name
- Cortinarius bellus E. Horak 1990

= Cortinarius bellus =

Species of fungus

Cortinarius bellus is a basidiomycete fungus of the genus Cortinarius native to New Zealand, where it grows under Nothofagus and produces purple mushrooms that can grow in fairy rings.

== See also ==
- List of Cortinarius species
