= C10H12N4O4 =

The molecular formula C_{10}H_{12}N_{4}O_{4} (molar mass: 252.23 g/mol) may refer to:

- Nebularine
- 5,6-Dihydro-5(α-thyminyl)thymine
