= Björn Lüning =

Swedish chemist, botanist, and filmmaker (1929–2024)

- Born: 18 June 1929; Stockholm, Sweden
- Died: 25 September 2024 (aged 95); Gustav Vasa District, Sweden
- Citizenship: Sweden
- Occupation: Chemist
- Employer: Stockholm University
- Spouse: Inga Lüning (married 1955-2007)
- Parent(s): Bertil Lüning; Julia Lüning
- Relatives: Örjan Lüning (brother)

Björn Eric Gustav Bertilsson Lüning (18 June 1929 – 25 September 2024) was born in Stockholm, Sweden to Bertil and Julia Lüning. Lüning's professional title was Docent and Senior Lecturer in Organic Chemistry at Stockholm University. He was also a filmmaker, botanist, and a railway preservationist.

== Chemistry ==
After graduating from high school in 1947, Lüning earned a Bachelor of Arts degree in 1955, a Licentiate of Philosophy in 1957, a Doctor of Philosophy in Stockholm in 1960 and became a docent (associate professor) of organic chemistry at Stockholm University in 1962. He served as a research and teaching assistant at Stockholm University from 1951 to 1960, as an assistant professor from 1960 to 1966 and as a senior lecturer in organic chemistry at Stockholm University beginning in 1966. He has authored works on chemistry, particularly in organic natural product chemistry.

In 1953, Björn Lüning, alongside Nils Löfgren and Harry Hedström, isolated the purine nucleoside, nebularine, from Clitocybe nebularis.

== Botany ==
Lüning was a botanical researcher who specialized in the orchid family. He has been involved in a multi-decade chemical screening series titled Studies on Orchidaceae alkaloids. His work in organic natural product chemistry established a connection between structural chemistry and structural plant biology.

He served as the chairman of the Swedish Orchid Society and authored localized reference materials, including an analysis of Carl Linnaeus's historical transit through Öland's Böda parish. In 1969, Lüning notably introduced a rare autumn-flowering orchid variety, the autumn lady's-tresses from British botanical stock onto a site in northern Öland; the planting successfully established a stable, self-sustaining wild population that grew to several hundred plants.

== Film and art ==
Lüning was an early proponent of the mid-century Swedish avant-garde film movement. Between 1946 and 1953, he experimented with 9.5mm and 16mm film formats, operating alongside the Svensk Experimentfilmstudio (later known as Arbetsgruppen för Film) in Stockholm. Lüning approached the moving image as a rhythmic medium designed to interact with music and poetry, rather than traditional narrative storytelling. His cinematic work from this period was screened withing networks of contemporary Swedish independent filmmakers.

Lüning's filmography and historical biographical timeline are formally archived by Filmform, the Swedish Art Film and Video Archive. His experimental short films continue to be screened internationally in retrospectives focusing on early European vanguard cinema.

== Railway preservation ==
Lüning was a dedicated railway enthusiast. He acquired the historic steam locomotive, Karolina. Lüning's private collection helped spur the creation of the Sollentuna Enskilda Järnväg (SEJ) and his locomotive was loaned out to preserve the Böda Forest Railway museum line on Öland.
