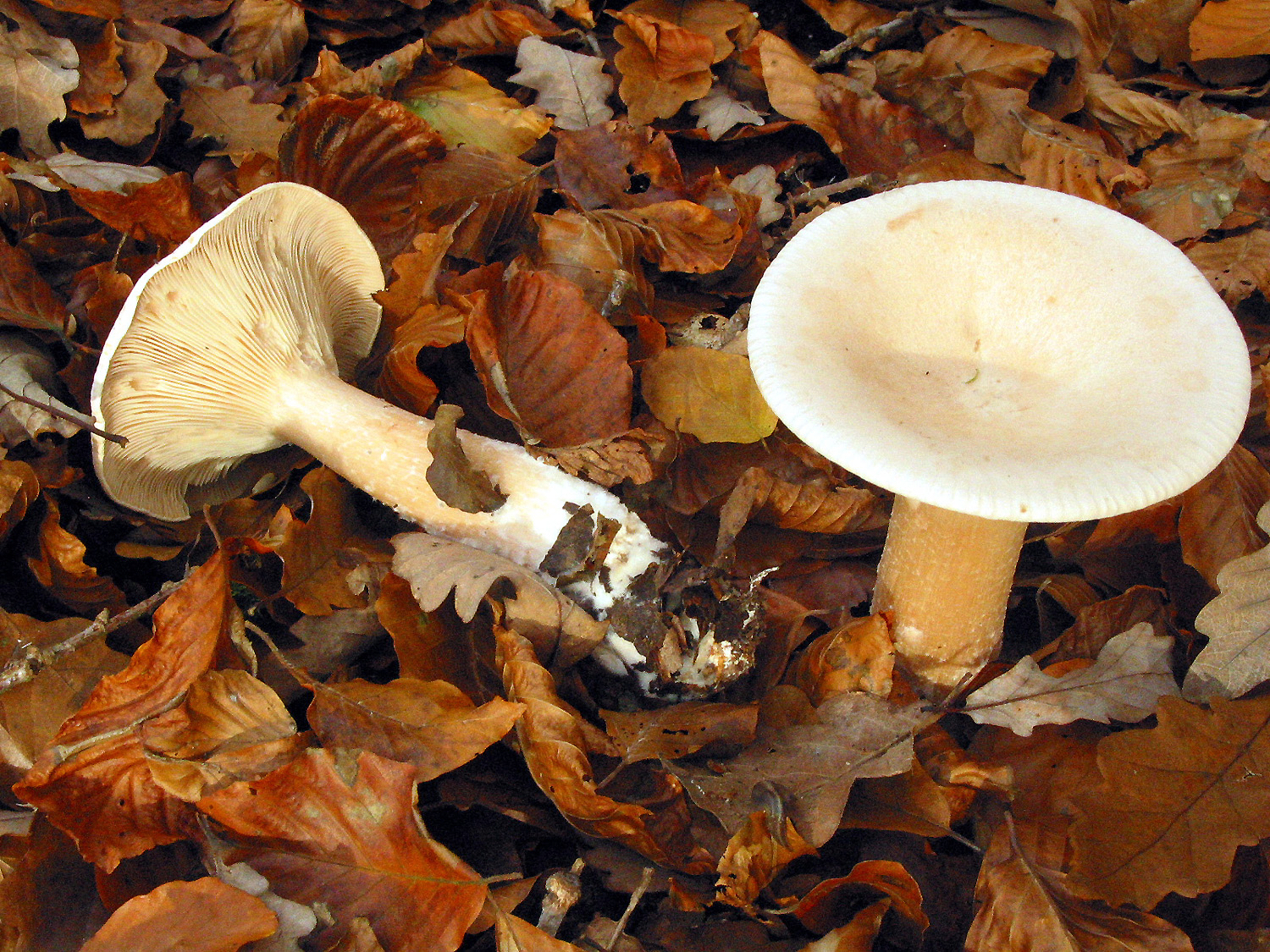

Scientific classification
- Kingdom: Fungi
- Division: Basidiomycota
- Class: Agaricomycetes
- Order: Agaricales
- Family: Omphalinaceae
- Genus: Infundibulicybe
- Species: I. geotropa

Binomial name
- Infundibulicybe geotropa (Bull.) Harmaja

Synonyms
- Clitocybe geotropa (Bull.) Quél.

= Infundibulicybe geotropa =

Infundibulicybe geotropa Mycological characteristics
- Gills on hymenium
- Cap is depressed
- Hymenium is decurrent
- Stipe is bare
- Spore print is white
- Ecology is saprotrophic
- Edibility is choice

Infundibulicybe geotropa, also known as the trooping funnel or monk's head, is a large funnel-shaped mushroom with a sturdy cream or buff colour. It grows widely in Europe and (less commonly) in North America in mixed woodlands, often in troops or fairy rings, one of which is over half a mile wide. Although edible, it could be confused with some poisonous species of similar colouration and size.

== Taxonomy ==
French mycologist Pierre Bulliard initially described the trooping funnel as Agaricus geotropus in 1792, before Lucien Quélet renamed it Clitocybe geotropa (a name by which it was long known) in 1872. Its specific epithet derived from the Ancient Greek words γῆ/gē "earth", and τρόπος/tropos "turn".

Finnish mycologist Harri Harmaja proposed I. geotropa and twelve other Clitocybe species be split off into a new genus Infundibulicybe, thus the new binomial name is Infundibulicybe geotropa.

== Description ==
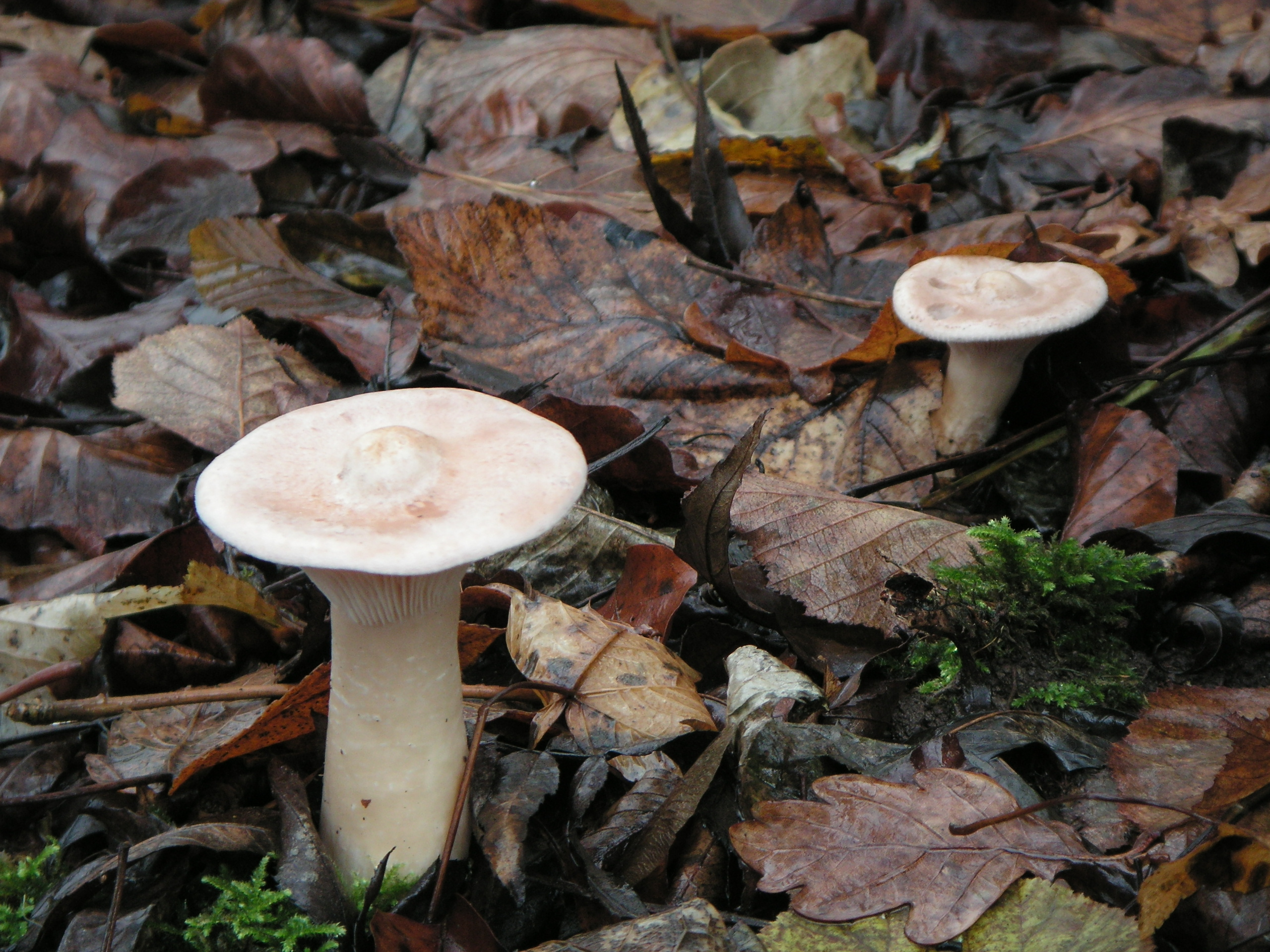
Young specimens with distinctly bossed small caps

A cream- or buff-coloured mushroom, the cap may reach 20 cm (8 in) in diameter. It has a prominent boss and looks small in relation to the large stem in young specimens. As the mushroom ages, the cap changes from convex with inrolled margins to more funnel shaped. The decurrent gills are the same colour as the cap. The stipe is bulbous, larger at the base and 10–20 cm (4–8 in) high. The spore print is white. There is a sweet smell, which has been likened to the odour of bitter almonds. The white flesh is firm in young specimens.

=== Similar species ===
It can be mistaken for the similar-coloured and also edible miller (Clitopilus prunulus), but the latter species has pink spores. However, there are a number of similar white or pale mushrooms which are poisonous; young specimens of Entoloma sinuatum can be distinguished by their sinuate gills and mealy smell. The unpleasant-tasting Melanoleuca grammopodia is similar, but has a more pale brownish cap and musky odour.

== Distribution and habitat ==
Trooping funnel is found in mixed woodlands, especially grassy clearings, in autumn. Often gregarious, it can form fairy rings, and has a complex mycelium. It is abundant and widespread in Europe (August to November), and less common in North America.

One fairy ring in Belfort, eastern France, has been reported at over half a mile in diameter and estimated at 800 years of age. It is thought to be the largest known fairy ring.

== Edibility ==
Only young mushrooms are recommended for eating, as older ones lose their pleasant taste, and the flesh becomes leathery in consistency. The stipes of all aged specimens are generally discarded. The fungus is popular in northern Italy, where it is roasted or cooked in stews and frittatas, or preserved in oil.
