= Clitocine =

Names
- Preferred IUPAC name (2R,3R,4S,5R)-2-[(6-Amino-5-nitropyrimidin-4-yl)amino]-5-(hydroxymethyl)oxolane-3,4-diol

Identifiers
CAS Number	105798-74-1
3D model (JSmol)	Interactive image
ChEBI	CHEBI:178144
ChEMBL	ChEMBL304179
ChemSpider	114380
PubChem CID	129111
UNII	9Z4QXQ98QW
CompTox Dashboard (EPA)	DTXSID30909739
- InChI: InChI=1S/C9H13N5O6/c10-7-4(14(18)19)8(12-2-11-7)13-9-6(17)5(16)3(1-15)20-9/h2-3,5-6,9,15-17H,1H2,(H3,10,11,12,13)/t3-,5-,6-,9-/m1/s1 Key: OHEMBWZZEKCBAS-UUOKFMHZSA-N
- SMILES: C1=NC(=C(C(=N1)N[C@H]2[C@@H]([C@@H]([C@H](O2)CO)O)O)[N+](=O)[O-])N

Properties
Chemical formula	C_{9}H_{13}N_{5}O_{6}
Molar mass	287.232 g·mol^{−1}
- Except where otherwise noted, data are given for materials in their standard state (at 25 °C [77 °F], 100 kPa). Infobox references

Clitocine is a mushroom nucleoside isolate with anticancer activity in vitro.
