= Fairy ring =

Naturally occurring ring or arc of mushrooms

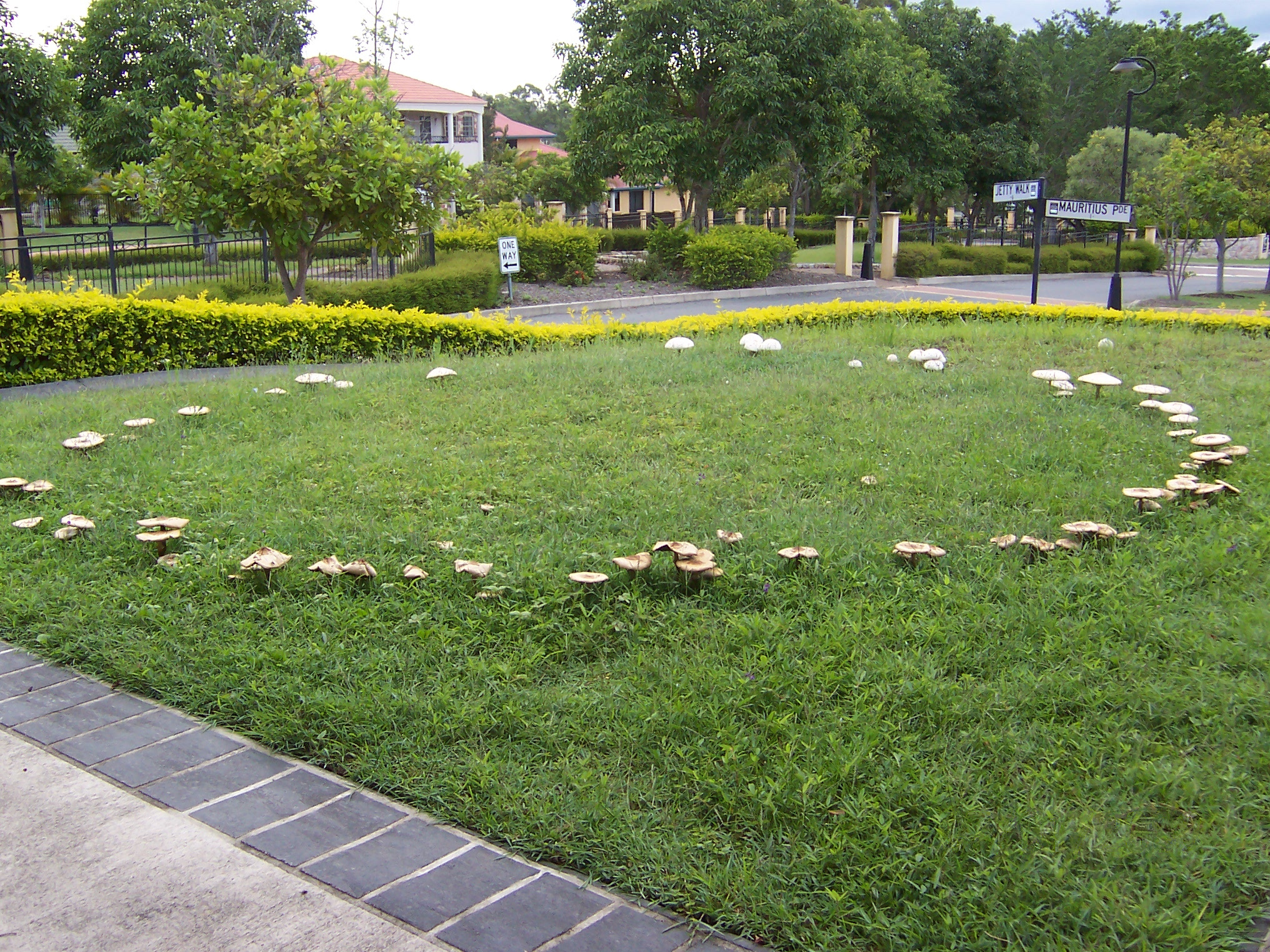
A fairy ring (possibly Chlorophyllum molybdites) on a suburban lawn in Brisbane, Queensland, Australia.

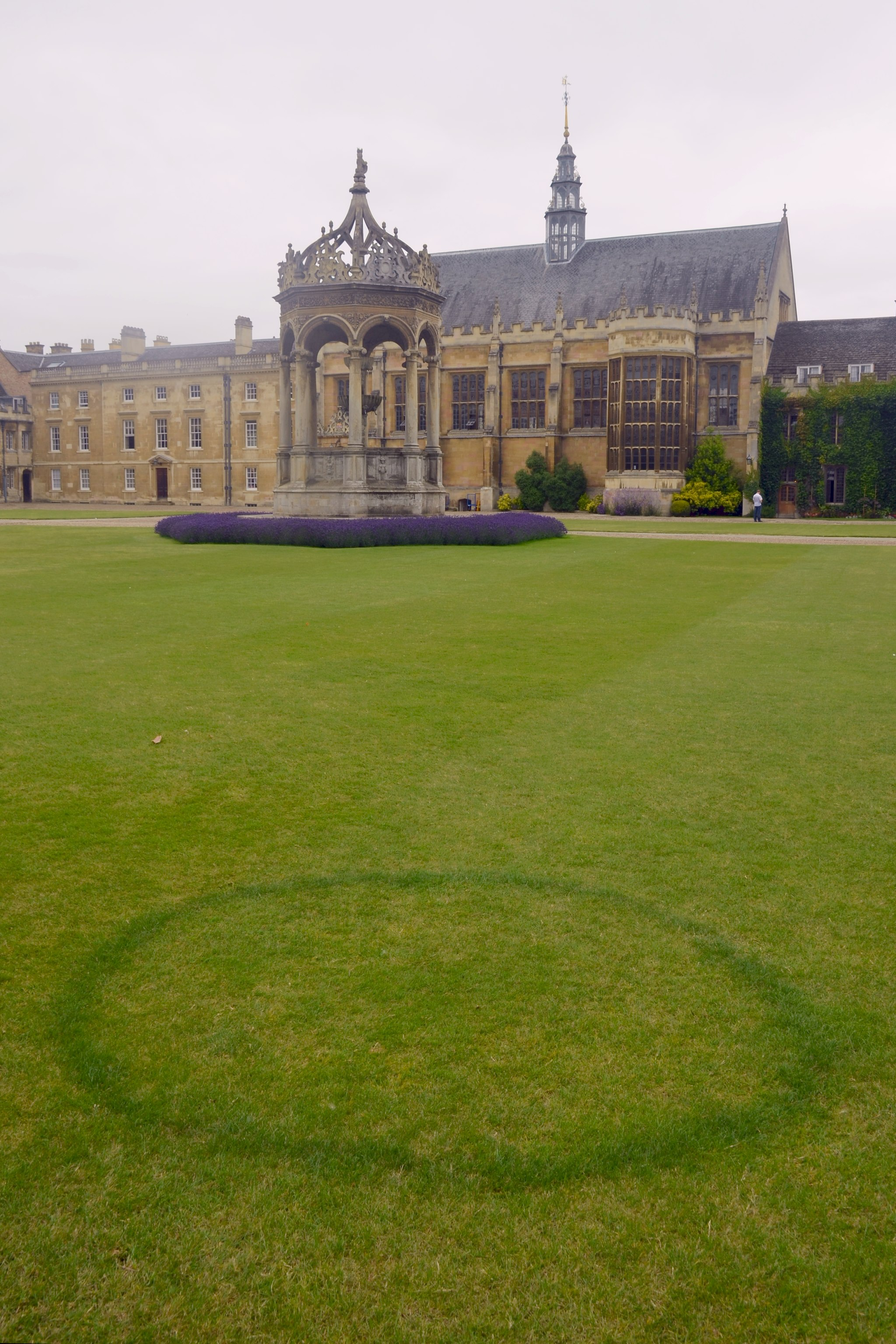
Fairy ring in a courtyard (Trinity Great Court).

A fairy ring, also known as fairy circle, elf circle, elf ring or pixie ring, is a naturally occurring ring or arc of mushrooms. They are found mainly in forested areas, but also appear in grasslands or rangelands. Fairy rings are detectable by sporocarps (fungal spore pods) in rings or arcs, as well as by a necrotic zone (dead grass), or a ring of dark green grass. Fungus mycelium is present in the ring or arc underneath. The rings may grow to over 10 metres (33 ft) in diameter, and they become stable over time as the fungus grows and seeks food underground.

Fairy rings are the subject of much folklore and myth worldwide, particularly in Western Europe. They are variously seen as hazardous or dangerous places linked with witches or the Devil, or as signs of good fortune.

== Genesis ==
The mycelium of a fungus growing in the ground absorbs nutrients by secretion of enzymes from the tips of the hyphae (thread-like branching filaments making up the mycelium). This breaks down larger molecules in the soil into smaller molecules that are absorbed through the hyphae walls near their growing tips. The mycelium moves outward from the center, and when the nutrients in the center are exhausted, the center dies, forming a living ring, from which the fairy ring arises.

There are two theories regarding the process involved in creating fairy rings. One states that the fairy ring is begun by a spore from the sporocarpus. The underground presence of the fungus can also cause withering or varying colour or growth of the grass above. The second theory, which is presented in the investigations of Japanese scientists on the Tricholoma matsutake species, shows that fairy rings could be established by connecting neighbouring oval genets of these mushrooms. If they make an arc or a ring, they continuously grow about the centre of this object.

== Necrotic or rapid growth zones ==
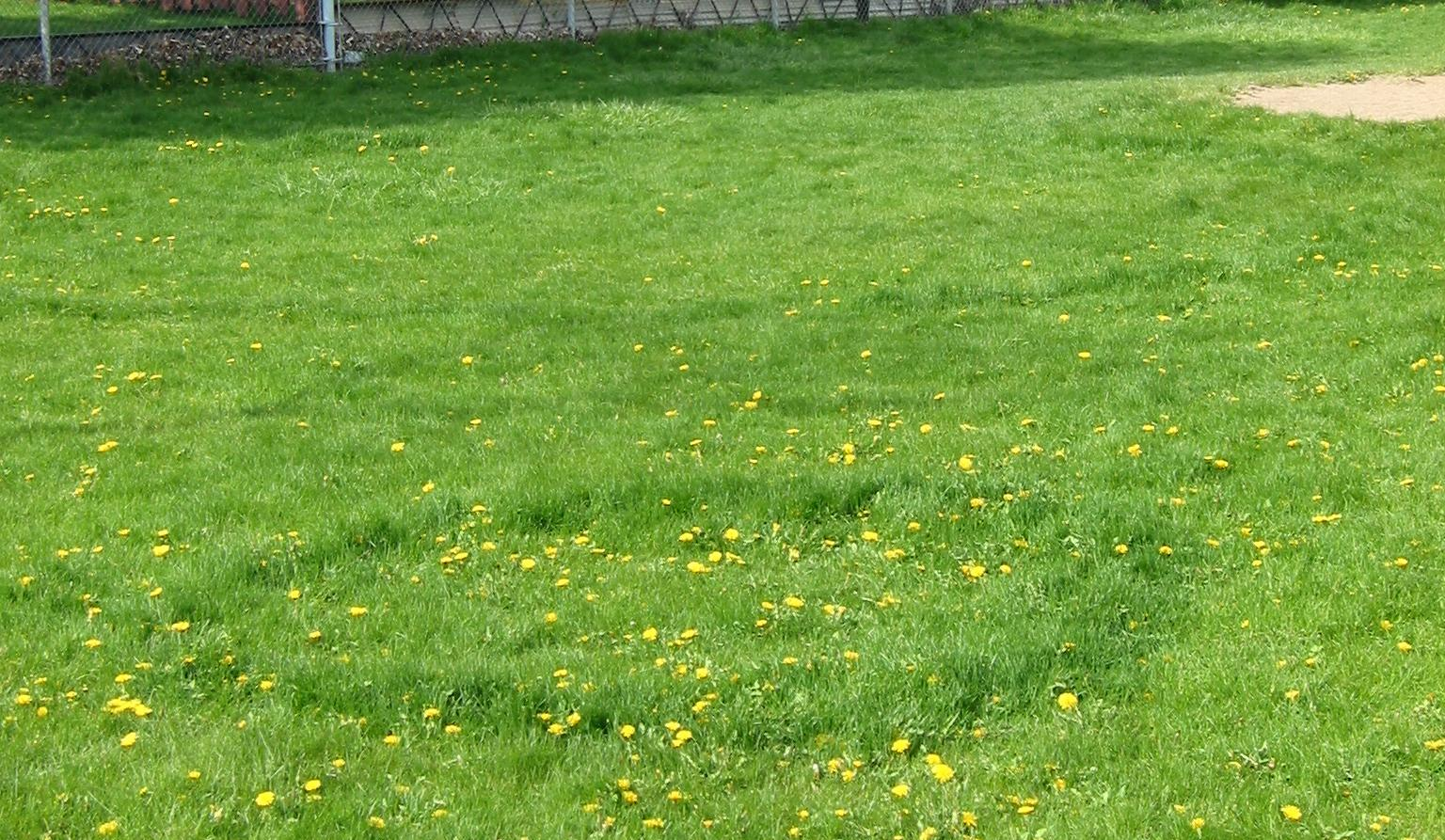
Two fairy rings marked by uneven grass growth (small one in foreground, much bigger one in the background). The lush green arcs of grass betray the presence of underground fungal mycelia.

One of the manifestations of fairy ring growth is a necrotic zone—an area in which grass or other plant life has withered or died. During a dry year, these zones are caused by the mycelia, which coat the roots of grasses and other herbs in meadows. After some time, they are removed by biotic factors from the ground; at this stage, a zone on the surface soil becomes visible. Patterns other than the basic ring or arc are also possible: circles, doubled arcs, sickle-shaped arcs, and other complicated formations are also formed by this process. Fungi can deplete the soil of readily available nutrients such as nitrogen, causing plants growing within the circle to be stressed, which leads to plant discoloration. Some fungi also produce chemicals that act like hormones called gibberellins, which affect plant growth, causing rapid luxuriant growth.

Long-term observations of fairy rings on Shillingstone Hill in Dorset, England, further suggested that the cycle depended on the continuous presence of rabbits. Chalky soils on higher elevations in the counties of Wiltshire and Dorset in southern England used to support many meadow-type fairy rings. Rabbits crop grass short in open areas and produce nitrogen-rich droppings. Mushrooms need more soil nitrogen than grass does. A ring can start from only a few spores from which the mycelium develops; the fruiting bodies of the mushrooms appearing only later when sufficient mycelial mass has been generated to support them. Subsequent generations of fungi grow only outward because the parent generations have depleted their local nitrogen levels. Meanwhile, rabbits keep cropping the grass, but do not eat the fungi, allowing them to grow through their competition to tower, relatively, above the grass. By the time a circle of mushrooms reaches about 6 metres (20 ft) in diameter, rabbit droppings have replenished the nitrogen levels near the centre of the circle, and a secondary ring may start to grow inside the first.

Soil analysis of soil containing mycelium from a wood blewit (Clitocybe nuda) fairy ring under Norway spruce (Picea abies) and Scots pine (Pinus sylvestris) in southeast Sweden yielded fourteen halogenated low molecular weight organic compounds, three of which were brominated and the others chlorinated. It is unclear whether these were metabolites or pollutants. Brominated compounds are unknown as metabolites from terrestrial fungi.

== Types ==
There are two generally recognised types of fairy ring fungus. Those found in the woods are called tethered because they are formed by mycorrhizal fungi living in symbiosis with trees. Meadow fairy rings are called free because they are disconnected from other organisms. These mushrooms are saprotrophic. The effects on the grass depend on the type of fungus that is growing; when Calvatia cyathiformis is growing in the area, grass grows more abundantly; however, Leucopaxillus giganteus causes the grass to wither.

== Species involved ==
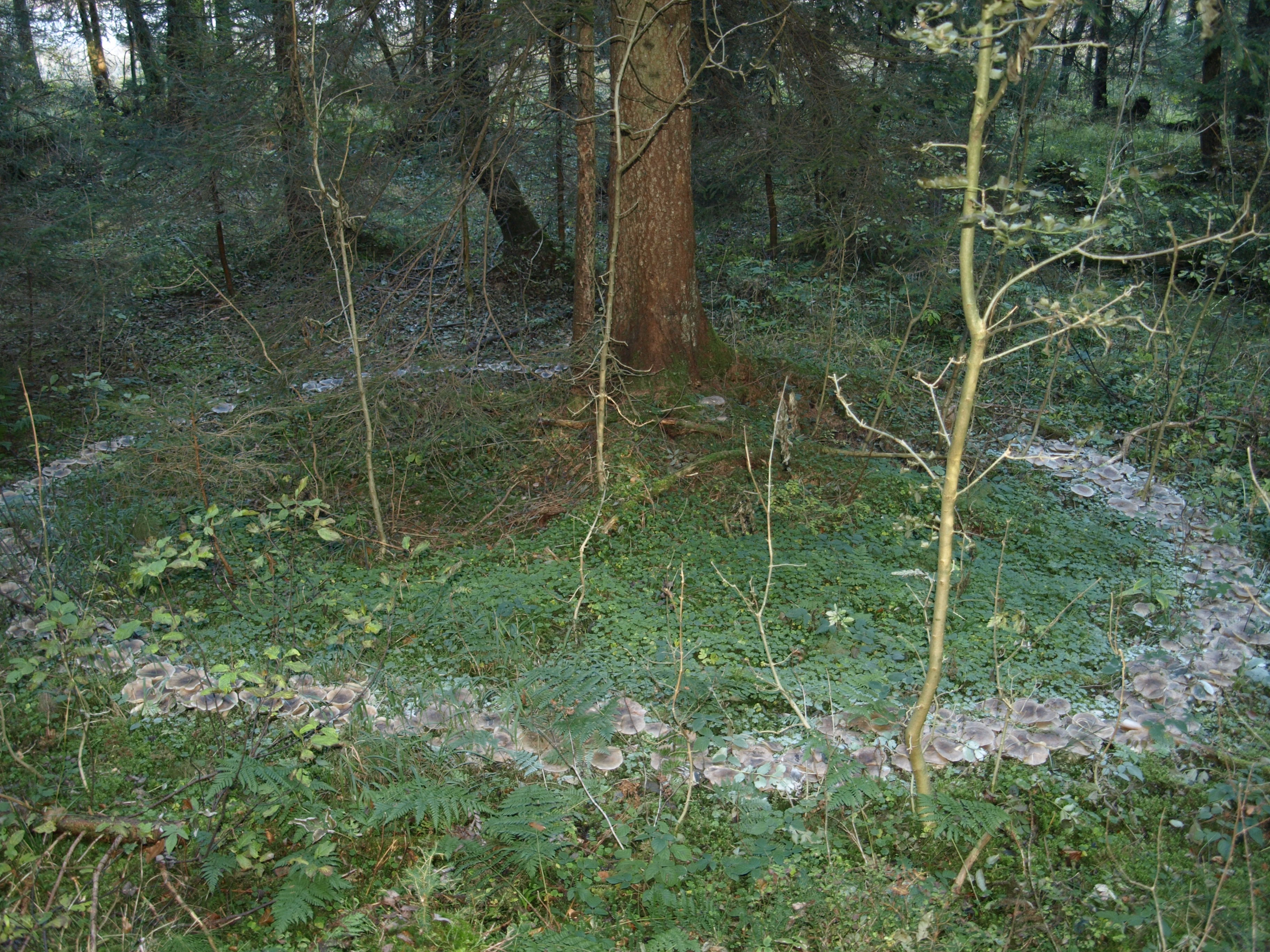
Profuse ring of Clitocybe nebularis.

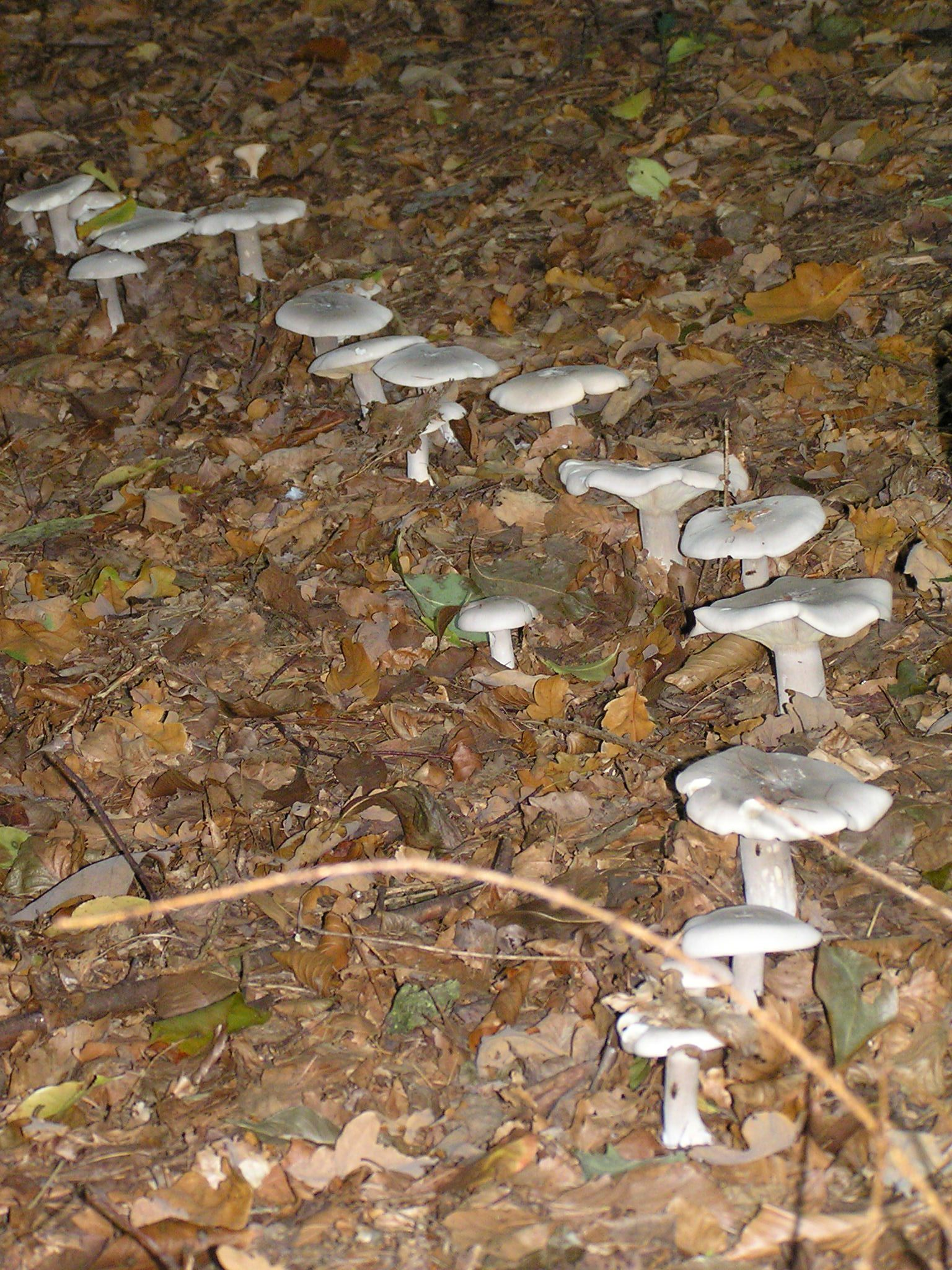
Clitocybe nebularis in part of ring.

About 60 mushroom species can grow in the fairy ring pattern. The best known is the edible Scotch bonnet (Marasmius oreades), commonly known as the fairy ring champignon.

One of the largest rings ever found is near Belfort in northeastern France. Formed by Infundibulicybe geotropa, it is thought to have a radius of about 300 metres (980 ft) and to be over 700 years old. On the South Downs in southern England, Calocybe gambosa has formed huge fairy rings that also appear to be several hundred years old.

=== List of species ===
- Agaricus arvensis
- Agaricus campestris
- Agaricus praerimosus
- Agrocybe praecox
- Amanita muscaria
- Amanita phalloides
- Amanita rubescens
- Bovista dermoxantha
- Calocybe gambosa
- Calvatia cyathiformis
- Calvatia gigantea
- Cantharellus cibarius
- Clitocybe dealbata
- Clitocybe nebularis
- Clitocybe nuda
- Clitocybe rivulosa
- Chlorophyllum molybdites
- Chlorophyllum rhacodes
- Cortinarius bellus
- Cortinarius glaucopus
- Cortinarius violaceus
- Cyathus stercoreus
- Disciseda subterranea
- Entoloma sinuatum
- Gomphus clavatus
- Hygrophorus agathosmus
- Hygrophorus pudorinus
- Hygrophorus russula
- Infundibulicybe geotropa
- Lepista sordida
- Leucopaxillus giganteus
- Lycoperdon curtisii
- Lycoperdon perlatum
- Macrolepiota procera
- Marasmius oreades
- Paralepista flaccida
- Sarcodon imbricatus
- Saproamanita thiersii
- Suillus luteus
- Tricholoma album
- Tricholoma orirubens
- Tricholoma pardinum
- Tricholoma matsutake
- Tricholoma terreum
- Tuber melanosporum

== Cultural references ==
=== Oral tradition and folklore ===
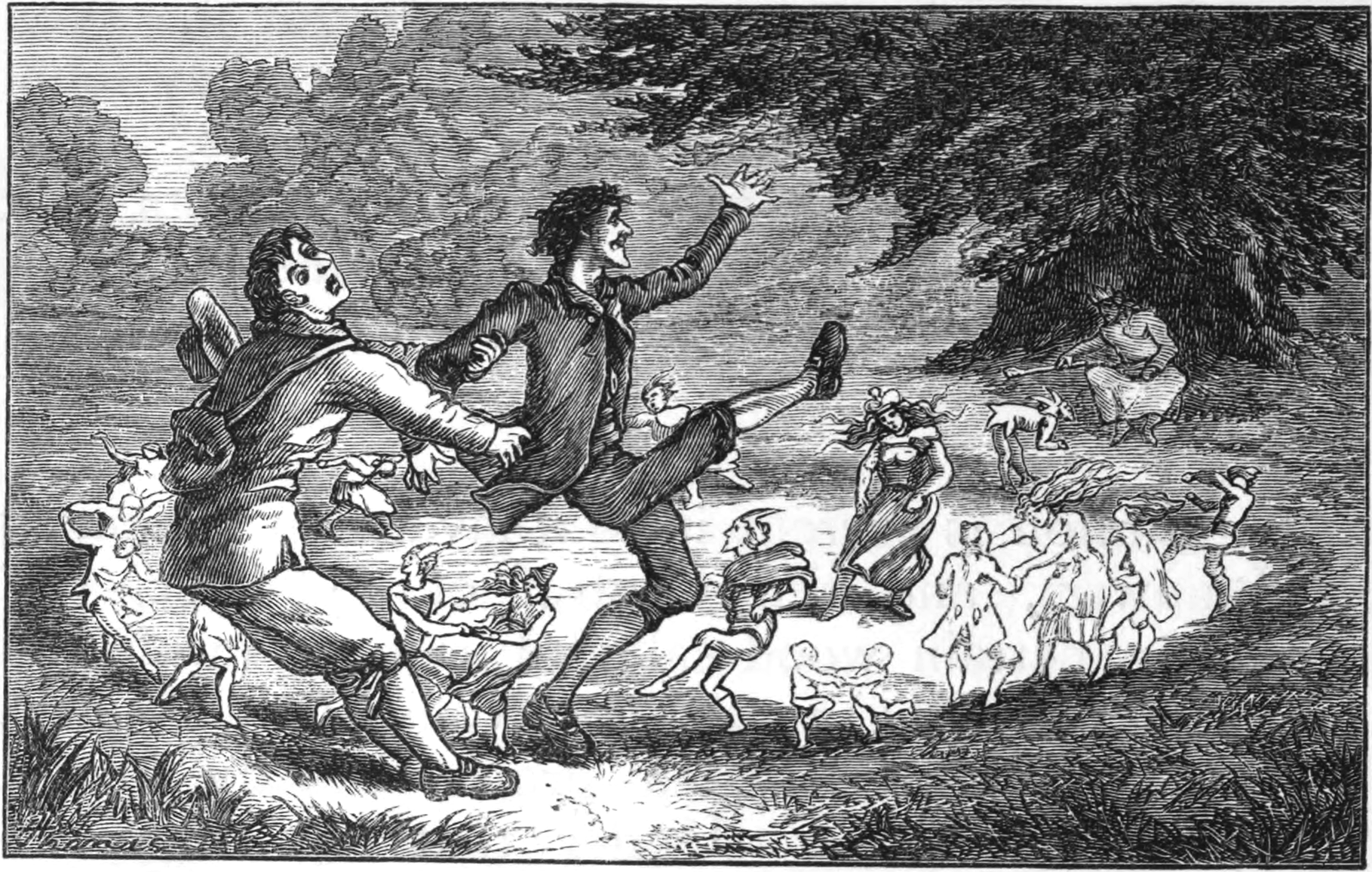
"Plucked from the Fairy Circle" A man saves his friend from the grip of a fairy ring.

A great deal of folklore surrounds fairy rings. Their names in European languages often allude to supernatural origins; they are known as ronds de sorcières ("witches' circles") in French, and Hexenringe ("witches' rings") in German. In German tradition, fairy rings were thought to mark the site of witches' dancing on Walpurgis Night, and Dutch superstition claimed that the circles show where the Devil set his milk churn. In Tyrol, folklore attributed fairy rings to the fiery tails of flying dragons; once a dragon had created such a circle, nothing but toadstools could grow there for seven years. European superstitions routinely warned against entering a fairy ring. French tradition reported that fairy rings were guarded by giant bug-eyed toads that cursed those who violated the circles. In other parts of Europe, entering a fairy ring would result in losing an eye. Fairy rings are associated with diminutive spirits in the Philippines.

Western European traditions, including English, Scandinavian, and Celtic, claimed that fairy rings are the result of elves or fairies dancing. Such ideas dated to at least the mediæval period; the Middle English term elferingewort ("elf-ring"), meaning "a ring of daisies caused by elves' dancing" dates to the 12th century. In his History of the Goths (1628), Swedish writer Olaus Magnus makes this connection, saying that fairy rings are burned into the ground by the dancing of elves. British folklorist Thomas Keightley noted that in Scandinavia in the early 19th century, beliefs persisted that fairy rings (elfdans) arose from the dancing of elves. Keightley warned that while entering an elfdans might allow the interloper to see the elves—although this was not guaranteed—it would also put the intruder in thrall to their illusions. (Note: The term for fairy ring in modern Norwegian is alvedans.)

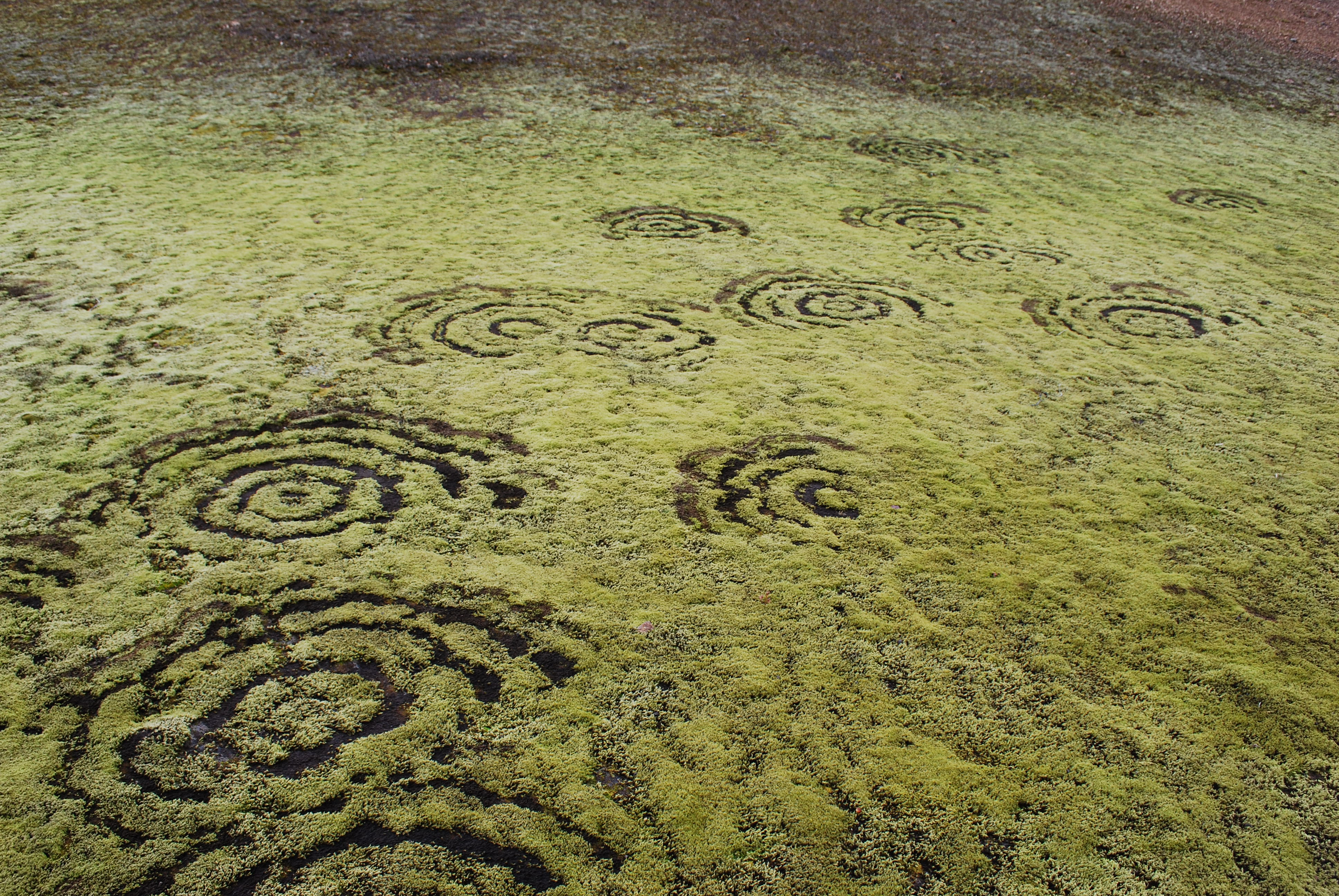
Fairy rings in moss in Iceland.

The folklores of Britain and Ireland contain a wealth of fairy lore, including the idea from which fairy rings take their name: the phenomena result from the dancing of fairies. In 19th-century Wales, where the rings are known as cylch y Tylwyth Teg, fairies were almost invariably described as dancing in a group when encountered, and in Scotland and Wales in the late 20th century, stories about fairy rings were still common; some Welshmen even claimed to have joined a fairy dance. Victorian folklorists regarded fairies and witches as related, based in part on the idea that both were believed to dance in circles. These revels are particularly associated with moonlit nights, the rings becoming visible to mortals only the following morning. Local variants add other details. An early 20th-century Irish tradition says that fairies enjoy dancing around the hawthorn tree so that fairy rings often centre on one. One resident of Balquhidder, Scotland, said that the fairies sit on the mushrooms and use them as dinnertables, and a Welsh woman claimed that fairies used the mushrooms as parasols and umbrellas. Olaus Magnus in Historia de Gentibus Septentrionalibus wrote that the brightness of the fairy ring comes not from the dancing of the fairies, who harm it with their feet, but from Puck, who refreshes the grass. A Devon legend says that a black hen and chickens sometimes appear at dusk in a large fairy ring on the edge of Dartmoor. A Welsh and Manx variant current in the 1960s removes dancing from the picture and claims that fairy rings spring up over an underground fairy village. These associations have become linked to specific sites. For example, "The Pixies' Church" was a rock formation in Dartmoor surrounded by a fairy ring, and a stone circle tops Cader Idris in northern Wales, believed to be a popular spot for fairy dances.

Many folk beliefs generally paint fairy rings as dangerous places, best avoided. American writer Wirt Sikes traces these stories of people trespassing into forbidden territory and being punished for it to the tale of Psyche and Eros. In it, Psyche is forbidden to view her lover; when she does so, her palace disappears, and she is left alone. Superstition calls fairy circles sacred and warns against violating them lest the interloper (such as a farmer with a plough) anger the fairies and be cursed. In an Irish legend recorded by Wilde, a farmer builds a barn on a fairy ring despite the protests of his neighbours. He is struck senseless one night, and a local "fairy doctor" breaks the curse. The farmer says that he dreamed that he must destroy the barn. Even collecting dew from the grass or flowers of a fairy ring can bring bad luck. Destroying a fairy ring is unlucky and fruitless; superstition says it would simply grow back.

A traditional Scottish rhyme sums up the danger of such places:

He wha tills the fairies' green
Nae luck again shall hae :
And he wha spills the fairies' ring
Betide him want and wae.
For weirdless days and weary nights
Are his till his deein' day.
But he wha gaes by the fairy ring,
Nae dule nor pine shall see,
And he wha cleans the fairy ring
An easy death shall dee.

Numerous legends focus on mortals entering a fairy ring—and the consequences. One superstition is that anyone who steps into an empty fairy ring will die at a young age. A 20th-century tradition from Somerset calls the fairy ring a "galley-trap" and says that a murderer or thief who walks in the ring will be hanged. Most often, someone who violates a fairy perimeter becomes invisible to mortals outside and may find it impossible to leave the circle. Often, the fairies force the mortal to dance to the point of exhaustion, death, or madness. In Welsh tales, fairies actively try to lure mortals into their circles to dance with them. A tale from the Cambrian Mountains of Wales, current in the 19th century, describes a mortal's encounter with a fairy ring:

... he saw the Tylwyth Teg, in appearance like tiny soldiers, dancing in a ring. He set out for the scene of revelry, and soon drew near the ring where, in a gay company of males and females, they were footing it to the music of the harp. Never had he seen such handsome people, nor any so enchantingly cheerful. They beckoned him with laughing faces to join them as they leaned backward almost falling, whirling round and round with joined hands. Those who were dancing never swerved from the perfect circle; but some were clambering over the old cromlech, and others chasing each other with surprising swiftness and the greatest glee. Still others rode about on small white horses of the most beautiful form ... All this was in silence, for the shepherd could not hear the harps, though he saw them. But now he drew nearer to the circle, and finally ventured to put his foot in the magic ring. The instant he did this, his ears were charmed with strains of the most melodious music he had ever heard.

Entering the ring on May Eve or Halloween night was especially dangerous. One source near Afon fach Blaen y Cae, a tributary of the Dwyfach, tells of a shepherd accidentally disturbing a ring of rushes where fairies are preparing to dance; they capture him and hold him captive, and he even marries one of them. In variants from Scotland recorded by Edwin Sidney Hartland in 1891, the ring is replaced by a cavern or an old mill.

Freedom from a fairy ring often requires outside intervention. A tactic from early 20th-century Wales is to cast wild marjoram and thyme into the circle and befuddle the fairies; another asks the rescuer to touch the victim with iron. Other stories require that the enchanted victim simply be plucked out by someone on the outside, although even this can be difficult: A farmer in a tale from the Llangollen region has to tie a rope around himself and enlist four men to pull him from the circle as he goes in to save his daughter. Other folk methods rely on Christian faith to break the enchantment: a stick from a rowan tree (thought to be the wood from which the cross of Jesus Christ was built) can break the curse, as can a simple phrase such as "what, in Heaven's name", as in a 19th-century tale from Carmarthenshire. A common element to these recoveries is that the rescuer must wait a year and a day from when the victim entered the ring.

Mortals who have danced with the fairies are rarely safe after being saved from their enthrallment. They often find that what seemed to be but a brief foray into fairyland was much longer in the mortal realm, possibly weeks or years. The person rescued from the fairy ring may have no memory of their encounter with the sprites, as in a story from Anglesey recorded in 1891. In most tales, the saved interlopers face a grim fate. For example, in a legend from Carmarthenshire, recorded by Sikes, a man is rescued from a fairy ring only to crumble to dust. In a tale from Mathavarn, Llanwrin Parish, a fairy-ring survivor moulders away when he eats his first bite of food. Another vulnerability seems to be iron; in a tale from the Aberystwyth region, a touch from the metal causes a rescued woman to disappear.

Some legends assert that the only safe way to investigate a fairy ring is to run around it nine times. This affords the ability to hear the fairies dancing and frolicking underground. According to a 20th-century tradition of Northumberland, this must be done under a full moon, and the runner must travel in the direction of the sun; to go widdershins allows the fairies to place the runner under their sway. To circle the ring a tenth time is foolhardy and dangerous. Keightley recorded a similar tradition from Northumberland in 1828: "The children constantly run this number [nine times], but nothing will induce them to venture a tenth run." A story from early 20th century England says that a mortal can see the sprites without fear if a friend places a foot on that of the person stepping beyond the circle's perimeter. Another superstition says that wearing a hat backward can confuse the fairies and prevent them from pulling the wearer into their ring.

Although they strongly associate doom, some legends paint fairy circles as places of fertility and fortune. Welsh folk believe that mountain sheep that eat the grass of a fairy ring flourish, and crops sown from such a place prove more bountiful than those from normal land. A folk belief recorded in the Athenian Oracle claims that a house built on a fairy circle brings prosperity to its inhabitants. Likewise, a legend from Pont y Wern says that in the 13th or 14th century, the inhabitants of the town of Corwrion watched fairies dancing in a ring around a glow worm every Sunday after church at a place called Pen y Bonc. They even joined the sprites in their revels. The legend survives in a rhyme: "With the fairies nimbly dancing round / The glow-worm on the Rising Ground." John Rhys recorded a Welsh tale in 1901 that tells of a man who supposedly lived on the side of the Berwyn, above Cwm Pennant, in the early 19th century. The man destroyed a nest of rooks in a tree surrounded by a fairy ring. In gratitude, the fairies gave him a half crown every day but stopped when he told his friend, "for he had broken the rule of the fair folks by making their liberality known". Nevertheless, fairy boons are not without their curses, and tales often tell of the sprites exacting their revenge.

=== Literature ===
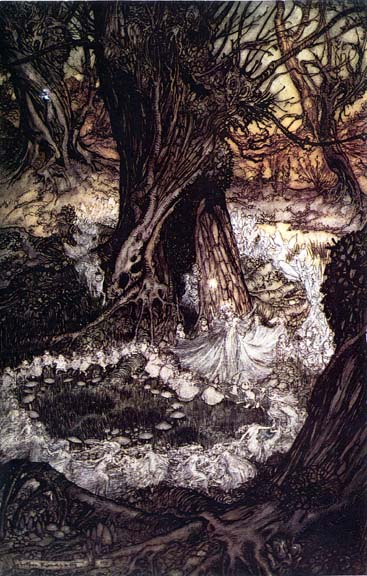
"Come, now a roundel." One of Arthur Rackham's illustrations to Shakespeare's A Midsummer Night's Dream.

Fairy rings have been featured in the works of European authors, playwrights, and artists since the 13th century. In his Arthurian romance Meraugis de Portlesguez, Raoul de Houdenc describes a scene clearly derived from Celtic fairy-ring lore: The title character visits the Château des Caroles and sees a circle of women and a knight dancing around a pine in the castle courtyard. Meraugis is unable to fight the intense desire to join in, thus freeing the previous knight from the spell. Meraugis is helpless to leave the dance until, ten weeks later, another knight joins it and frees him. Fairy circles feature in works by several Elizabethan poets and playwrights. William Shakespeare alludes to them in A Midsummer Night's Dream, Act II, Scene I ("And I serve the fairy queen, / To dew her orbs upon the green" and "To dance our ringlets to the whistling wind"), and The Tempest, Act V, Scene I:

... you demi-puppets that
By moonshine do the green sour ringlets make,
Whereof the ewe not bites, and you whose pastime
Is to make midnight mushrooms, that rejoice
To hear the solemn curfew ...

Shakespeare's contemporary Thomas Randolph speaks of fairy rings in his Amyntas, or the Impossible Dowry (1638), and Michael Drayton describes one in Nymphidia: The Court of Fairy:

And in their courses make that round
In meadows and in marshes found,
Of them so called the Fairy Ground,
Of which they have the keeping.

Fairy imagery became especially popular in the Victorian era. Thomas Hardy uses a fairy ring as a symbol of lost love in The Mayor of Casterbridge (1886); the character Michael Henchard passes a fairy ring and remembers that he last saw his wife Susan there when he sold her to a sailor in a drunken rage. Victorian poets who have referred to fairy rings in their works include Elizabeth Barrett Browning, Eliza Cook, Robert Stephen Hawker, Felicia Hemans, Gerald Massey, and Alfred, Lord Tennyson. (Note: See Browning, "The Deserted Garden"; Cook, "'Don't You Remember?'"; Hawker, "The Fairy Vision" and "Chorus of Fairies"; Hemans, "Canto III"; Massey, "Love's Fairy-ring"; and Tennyson, "Guinevere".) W. H. Cummings composed the cantata The Fairy Ring, and William Butler Yeats wrote of them in The Land of Heart's Desire (1894).

=== Art ===
Fairy circles have appeared in European artwork since at least the 18th century. For example, William Blake painted Oberon, Titania and Puck with Fairies Dancing, depicting a scene from Shakespeare's A Midsummer Night's Dream, around 1785, and Daniel Maclise painted Faun and the Fairies around 1834. Images of fairies dancing in circles became a favourite trope of painters in the Victorian period. On the one hand, artists were genuinely interested in the culture such imagery represented, and on the other, fairies could be depicted as titillating nudes and semi-nudes without offending Victorian mores, which made them a popular subject of art collectors. Examples of Victorian fairy-ring paintings include Come unto these Yellow Sands (1842) by Richard Dadd and Reconciliation of Titania and Oberon (1847) by Joseph Noel Paton.

Fairy rings in art

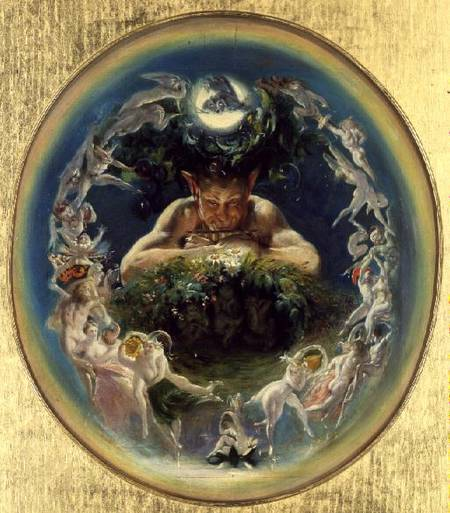
Faun and the Fairies (1834) by Daniel Maclise

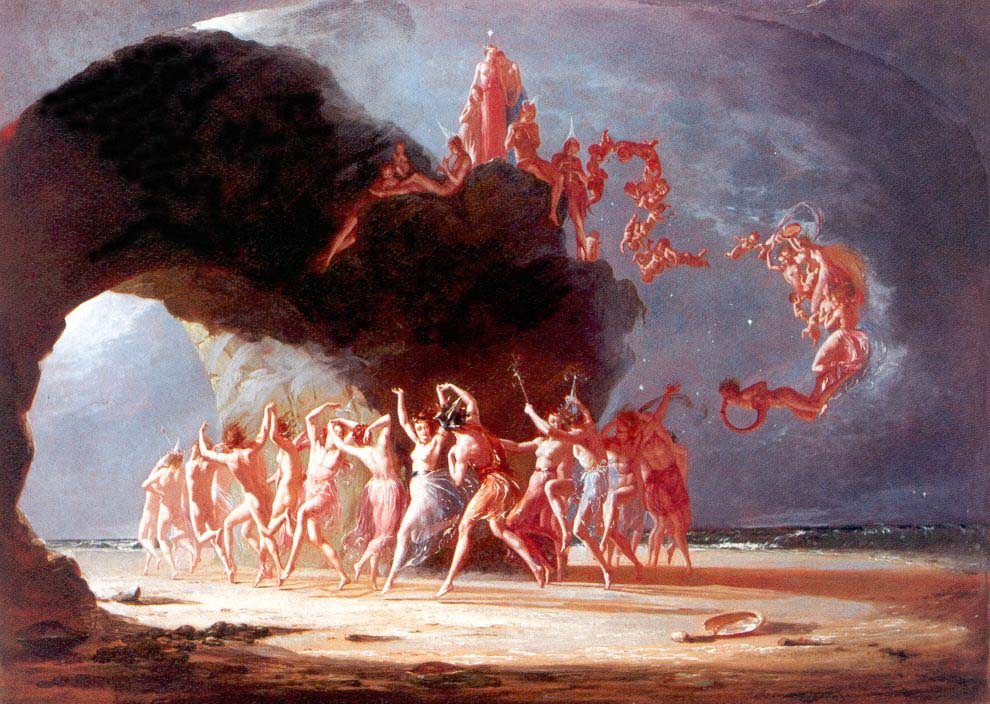
Come unto These Yellow Sands (1842) by Richard Dadd. Images of nude and semi-nude fairies dancing in rings became popular during the Victorian era.

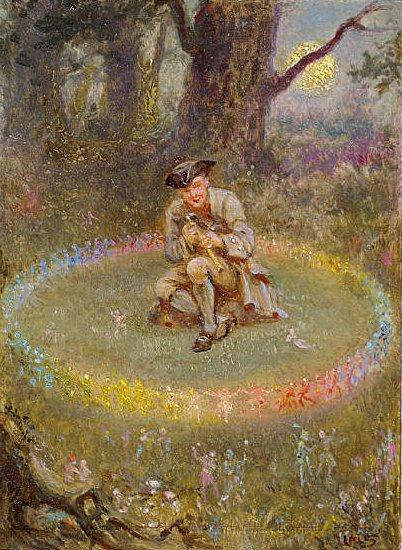
The Fairy Ring; the Enchanted Piper (c. 1880) by William Holmes Sullivan

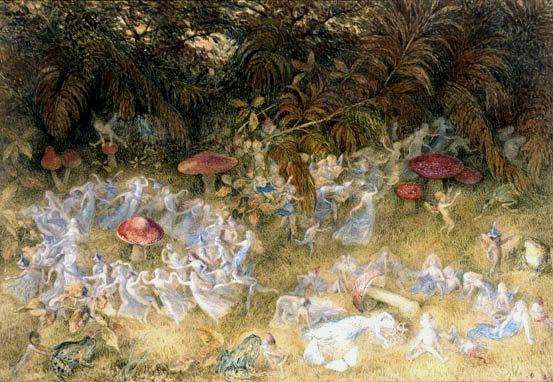
Although the fairy realm may be seen as benevolent, on the other hand, according to many folk tales, an invasion of the Fairy ring is perilous for men. Fairy Rings by Richard Doyle, 1875.

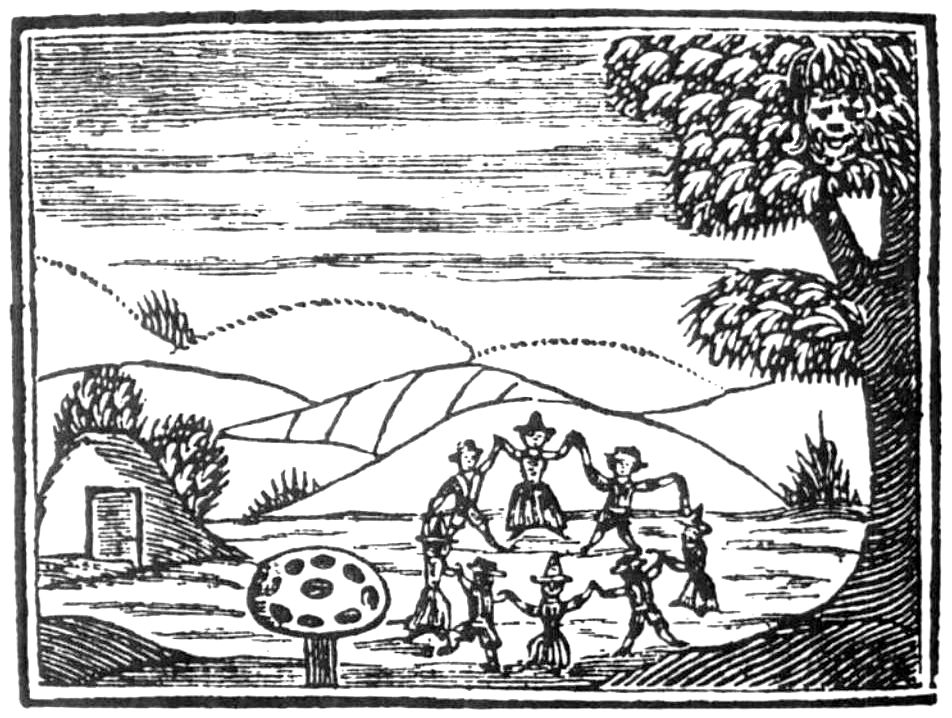
Woodcut of a fairy-circle from a 17th-century chapbook

=== Video games and film ===
In The Spiderwick Chronicles (2008) film a giant fairy ring surrounds and protects the house from goblins.

=== Television ===
In what the showrunner Russell T. Davies describes as "Welsh folk horror," 2024's 73 Yards, the fourth episode of the fourteenth season of the long-running BBC's sci-fi series Doctor Who, shows disaster when The Fifteenth Doctor accidentally steps on a fairy circle and his companion, Ruby Sunday, reads one of the messages on it.

== See also ==
- Fairy path
- Fairy fort
- Fairy circle – circular patches of barren land found in grasslands of the Namib desert and Australia
- Forest ring – Patterns of low tree density in northern Canada
