= Hesperentomon dianicum =

Scientific classification
- Kingdom: Animalia
- Phylum: Arthropoda
- Class: Entognatha
- Order: Protura
- Family: Hesperentomidae
- Genus: Hesperentomon
- Species: H. dianicum

Binomial name
- Hesperentomon dianicum Yin, Xie & Imadaté, 1994

Species of insect-like animal

Hesperentomon dianicum is a species of proturan in the family Hesperentomidae. It is found in Southern Asia.
