= Hesperentomon macswaini =

Scientific classification
- Kingdom: Animalia
- Phylum: Arthropoda
- Class: Entognatha
- Order: Protura
- Family: Hesperentomidae
- Genus: Hesperentomon
- Species: H. macswaini

Binomial name
- Hesperentomon macswaini Price, 1960

Species of insect-like animal

Hesperentomon macswaini is a species of proturan in the family Hesperentomidae. It is found in North America.
