= Hesperentomon martynovae =

Scientific classification
- Domain: Eukaryota
- Kingdom: Animalia
- Phylum: Arthropoda
- Order: Protura
- Family: Hesperentomidae
- Genus: Hesperentomon
- Species: H. martynovae

Binomial name
- Hesperentomon martynovae Szeptycki, 1988

Species of insect-like animal

Hesperentomon martynovae is a species of proturan in the family Hesperentomidae. It is found in Europe and Northern Asia (excluding China).
