= Ionescuellum montanum =

Scientific classification
- Domain: Eukaryota
- Kingdom: Animalia
- Phylum: Arthropoda
- Order: Protura
- Family: Hesperentomidae
- Genus: Ionescuellum
- Species: I. montanum

Binomial name
- Ionescuellum montanum (Gisin, 1945)

Species of insect-like animal

Ionescuellum montanum is a species of proturan in the family Hesperentomidae. It is found in Europe and Northern Asia (excluding China).
