= Ionescuellum haybachae =

Scientific classification
- Kingdom: Animalia
- Phylum: Arthropoda
- Class: Entognatha
- Order: Protura
- Family: Hesperentomidae
- Genus: Ionescuellum
- Species: I. haybachae

Binomial name
- Ionescuellum haybachae (Nosek, 1967)

Species of insect-like animal

Ionescuellum haybachae is a species of proturan in the family Hesperentomidae. It is found in Europe and Northern Asia (excluding China).
