= Ionescuellum carpaticum =

Scientific classification
- Domain: Eukaryota
- Kingdom: Animalia
- Phylum: Arthropoda
- Order: Protura
- Family: Hesperentomidae
- Genus: Ionescuellum
- Species: I. carpaticum

Binomial name
- Ionescuellum carpaticum (Ionesco, 1930)

Species of insect-like animal

Ionescuellum carpaticum is a species of proturan in the family Hesperentomidae. It is found in Europe and Northern Asia (excluding China).
