= List of mushrooms of Hawaii =

The mushroom species of Hawaii inhabit the Hawaiian archipelago in the central North Pacific Ocean, southwest of the continental United States, southeast of Japan, and northeast of Australia. The islands are part of the State of Hawaii, United States. The state encompasses nearly the entire volcanic Hawaiian Island chain, comprising hundreds of islands spread over 1,500 miles (2,400 km).

At the southeastern end of the archipelago, the eight "main islands" are (from the northwest to southeast) Niʻihau, Kauaʻi, Oʻahu, Molokaʻi, Lānaʻi, Kahoʻolawe, Maui, and Hawaiʻi. The Northwestern Hawaiian Islands include many atolls, and reefs. Due to Hawaii's isolation many mushroom species are endemic (unique to the island chain).

In total the Hawaiian Islands comprise a total of 137 islands and atolls, with a total land area of 6,423.4 square miles (16,636.5 km^{2}). This archipelago and its oceans are physiographically and ethnologically part of the Polynesian subregion of Oceania.

The climate of Hawaii is typical for a tropical area, although temperatures and humidity tend to be a bit less extreme than other tropical locales due to the frequent trade winds blowing from the east.

== Species of mushrooms ==
Mushrooms of Hawaii
Hawaiian language Name	Common name	Genus	Scientific name	Family	Common family name	Endemic	Habitat
	Conocybe	Conocybe lactea					Lawn
	Leucoco	Leucoco fragillismus					Lawn
	Coprinus	Coprinus plicatillus					Lawn
	Chlorophyllum	Chlorophyllum molybdites					Lawn
	Lepista	Lepista tarda					Lawn, Compost piles/wood chips
	Agaricus	Agaricus comptuloides					Lawn
	Agrocybe	Agrocybe retigera					Lawn
	Agrocybe	Agrocybe pediades					Lawn
	Entiloma	Entiloma umbiciliforme					Lawn
	Hygrocybe	Hygrocybe conicoides					Lawn
	Dictyophora	Dictyophora cinnabarina					Lawn, Compost piles/wood chips
	Vascellum	Vascellum floridanum					Lawn
	Amanita	Amanita marmorata					Lawn
	Suilles	Suilles brevipesfragillismus					Lawn
	Suilles	Suiles salmonicolor					Lawn
	Coprinus	Coprinus lagopus					Compost piles/wood chips
	Coprinus	Coprinus cinereus					Compost piles/wood chips
	Coprinus	Coprinus curtus					Compost piles/wood chips
	Agaricus	Agaricus subrufescens					Compost piles/wood chips
	Bolbitis	Bolbitus coprophilus					Compost piles/wood chips
	Leucoagaricus	Leucoagaricus meleagris					Compost piles/wood chips
	Leucoagaricus	Leucoagaricus hortensis					Compost piles/wood chips
	Stropharia	Stropharia variicolor					Compost piles/wood chips
	Volvariella	Volvariella volvacae					Compost piles/wood chips
	Hypholoma	Hypholoma fasciculare					Compost piles/wood chips
	Pseudoculus	Pseudoculus fusiformis					Compost piles/wood chips
	Phallus	Phallus rubicundus					Compost piles/wood chips
	Mutinus	Mutinus bambusinus					Compost piles/wood chips
	Mutinus	Mutinus elegans					Compost piles/wood chips
	Cyathus	Cyathus pallidus					Compost piles/wood chips, Flowpots
	Peziza	Peziza arvernensis					Compost piles/wood chips
	Agaricus	Agaricus rotalis					Compost piles/wood chips
	Gymnopus	Gymnopus menehune					Compost piles/wood chips
	Gymnopus	Gymnopus luxurians					Compost piles/wood chips
	Lepiota	Lepiota besseyi					Compost piles/wood chips
	Leucocoprinus	Leucocoprinus birnbaumii					Compost piles/wood chips, Flowerpots
	Leucocoprinus	Leucocoprinus lilacinogranulosus					Flowerpots
	Conocybe	Conocybe fragilus					
	Hygrocybe	Hygrocybe mexicana					
		Galerina velutipes					
	Gymnopilus	Gymnopilus subtropicus					
