= Hesperentomon dunhuaense =

Scientific classification
- Domain: Eukaryota
- Kingdom: Animalia
- Phylum: Arthropoda
- Order: Protura
- Family: Hesperentomidae
- Genus: Hesperentomon
- Species: H. dunhuaense

Binomial name
- Hesperentomon dunhuaense Bu, Shrubovych & Yin, 2011

Species of insect-like animal

Hesperentomon dunhuaense is a species of proturan in the family Hesperentomidae.
