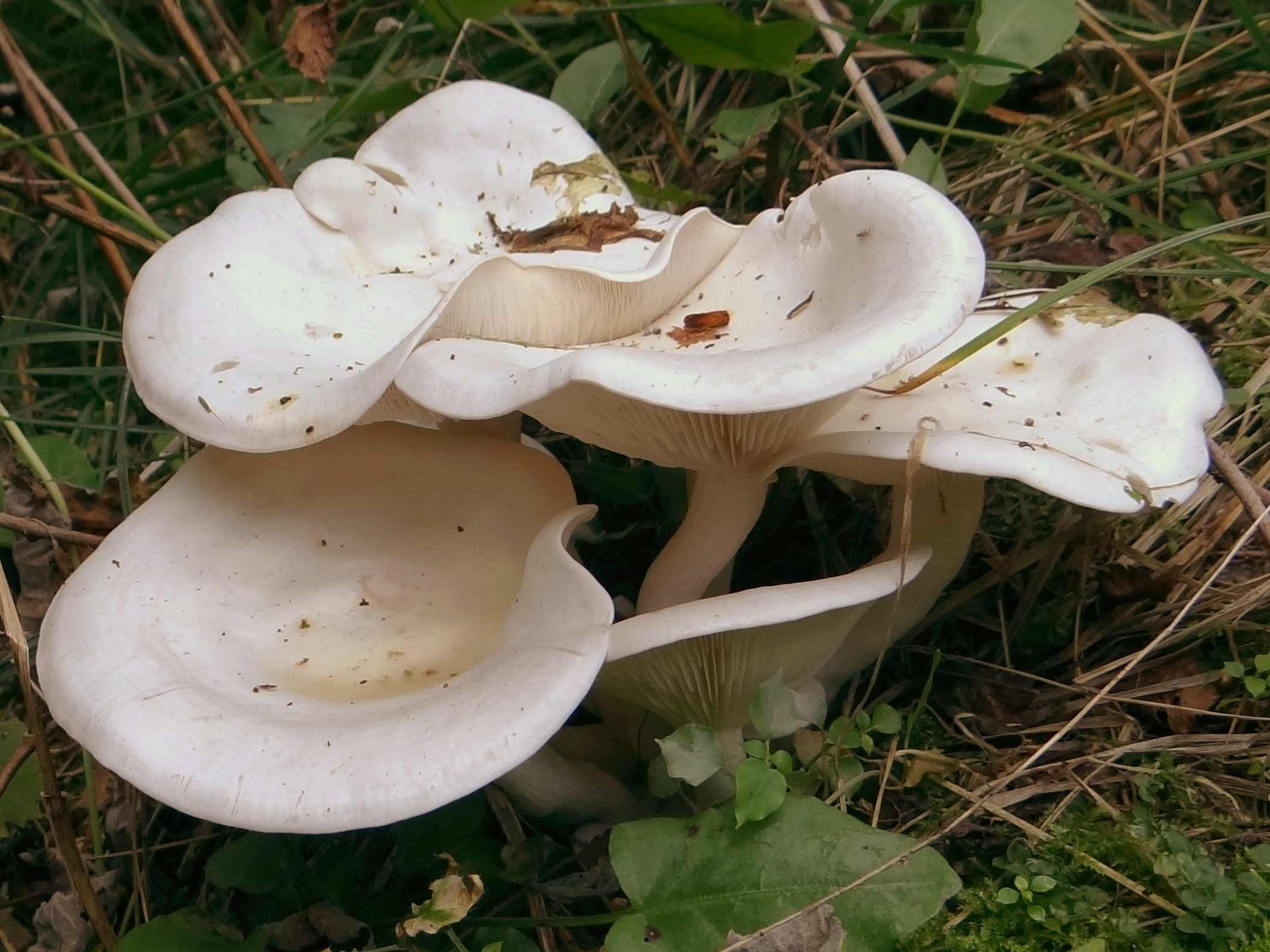

Scientific classification
- Kingdom: Fungi
- Division: Basidiomycota
- Class: Agaricomycetes
- Order: Agaricales
- Family: Clitocybaceae
- Genus: Collybia
- Species: C. phyllophila

Binomial name
- Collybia phyllophila (Pers.) Fr.

Synonyms
- Clitocybe phyllophila; Agaricus cerussatus Fr; Lepista phyllophila (Persoon) Harmaja; Agaricus phyllophilus Persoon; Agaricus pithyophilus Secr. ex Fr.; Omphalia phyllophila (Pers.) Quél.; Clitocybe cerrusata(Fr.) P. Kumm

= Collybia phyllophila =

Collybia phyllophila, commonly known as the frosty funnel or the leaf-loving clitocybe, is a fungus in the family Tricholomataceae. Its epithet, meaning leaf-loving comes from its preference for leaf litter. It is common among forests in the Northern Hemisphere, and is poisonous.

== Taxonomy ==
Collybia phyllophila was first described by Christiaan Hendrik Persoon as Agaricus phyllophilus in his work "Synopsis methodica fungorum" in 1801. In 1871, it was renamed to Clitocybe phyllophila by Paul Kummer in his book "Der Führer in die Pilzkunde" (The Guide to Fungi). However, a study in 2023 moved this species to the genus Collybia after phylogenetic analysis.

== Description ==
=== Macroscopic characteristics ===
Collybia phyllophila forms medium-sized to relatively large fruiting bodies. The cap is up to 3–10 centimetres (1.2–3.9 in) wide. It is initially convex, later flat and slightly depressed in the center, although it does not become funnel-shaped. The cap is white to yellow and has a silvery to chalky white, pruinose coating, especially when young. The cap margins are rolled or curved to broadly wavy, with irregularly raised lobes when mature. When wet, the cap shows pinkish-buff or pale-brown spots.

The gills are initially whitish-yellowish, later cream-colored and with a more or less pronounced pinkish tone. They are dense and are broadly attached to the stalk or slightly decurrent. They are 2-7 mm thick, smooth and not forked. The spore print is cream-colored and often with pink or buff tones.

The stalk is 3–8 centimetres (1.2–3.1 in) long and 0.5–1.2 centimetres (0.20–0.47 in) cm thick. It is cylindrical in shape, though occasionally widening at the base. It is dirty white but becomes more beige-brownish with age. Its surface is fibrillose, and silky at the top. Dense, wooly, white mycelium surrounds the base. The flesh is watery and white, but slightly gray-brownish, especially in the cap.

It has a mild, to later rancid or astringent taste and a strong, spicy odour.

=== Microscopic characteristics ===
Collybia phyllophila
- Mycological characteristics
- Gills on hymenium
- Cap is flat or depressed
- Hymenium is adnate or decurrent
- Stipe is bare
- Spore print is buff to pink
- Ecology is saprotrophic
- Edibility is poisonous

The hyaline spores are elliptical and measure 4-5.5 × 2.5-4 μm. Their surface is smooth and they do not glow under UV light. They are inamyloid and cyanophilous. In exsiccates they are usually connected in tetrahedrons. The basidia are club-shaped and measure 18-25 × 4.5-5.5 μm. They each have four spores. Cystidia are not present. The top layer of the cap consists of irregularly arranged, 2-4 μm wide hyphae. These usually have short nodular outgrowths or short branches. The flesh of the cap is composed of cylindric or inflated hyphae that are 4-13 μm wide. The septa have clamp connections.

== Ecology and distribution ==
Collybia phyllophila is a common saprotrophic species in deciduous and coniferous forests. It grows on the decaying needles of white and red pine, and occasionally on mixed leaf litter pine and birch. Collybia phyllophila fruits in clusters or tufts from September to November. It is widespread in temperate and subtropical zones of the Northern Hemisphere.

== Edibility ==
The fruiting bodies of Collybia phyllophila are poisonous as they, similar to other clitocyboid mushrooms contain muscarine. In one study, the amount of muscarine per kilogram varied between 19 and 86 mg. Symptoms of muscarinic poisoning include vomiting, diarrhea, constricted pupils sweating, bradycardia, hypotension.

== Similar species ==
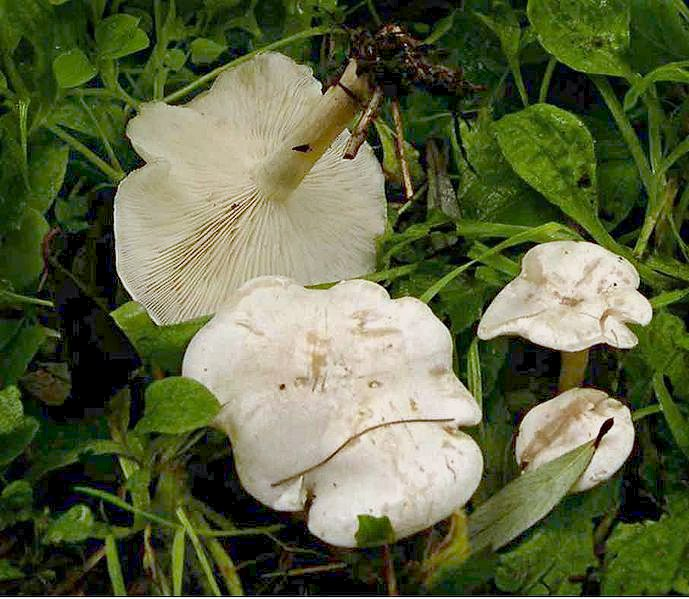
Clitocybe dealbata is a Collybia phyllophila look-a-like

Collybia phyllophila can be confused with other white clitocyboid mushrooms such as Collybia rivulosa, Clitocybe dealbata or Clitocybe candicans. These look-a-likes are usually smaller, have white spore powder, more decurrent gills and a differently structured cap top layer. Collybia rivulosa's spores are not cyanophilous, and are single in exsiccates. Clitopilus prunulus, is also very similar, though it can be distinguished by its strong floury odour, and larger spores, as well as pink gills that separate easily from the cap. Collybia alboclitocyboides can be distinguished from C. phyllophila by the subregular flesh of its gills and by how the hyphae in the top layer of its cap run completely parallel to the cap's surface

Leucocybe connata can also be confused with it, though unlike it, the frosty funnel does not react to ferrous sulfate. Faded fruiting bodies of Clitocybe odora also sometimes look similar to it, but smell distinctly of aniseed. Clitocybe odora also differs through its blue-green tinted cap, and the absence of fine white hairs or wet spots on its cap.
