= Ionescuellum condei =

Scientific classification
- Kingdom: Animalia
- Phylum: Arthropoda
- Class: Entognatha
- Order: Protura
- Family: Hesperentomidae
- Genus: Ionescuellum
- Species: I. condei

Binomial name
- Ionescuellum condei (Nosek, 1965)

Species of insect-like animal

Ionescuellum condei is a species of proturan in the family Hesperentomidae. It is found in Europe and Northern Asia (excluding China).
