= Ionescuellum silvaticum =

Scientific classification
- Kingdom: Animalia
- Phylum: Arthropoda
- Class: Entognatha
- Order: Protura
- Family: Hesperentomidae
- Genus: Ionescuellum
- Species: I. silvaticum

Binomial name
- Ionescuellum silvaticum (Rusek, 1965)

Species of insect-like animal

Ionescuellum silvaticum is a species of proturan in the family Hesperentomidae. It is found in Europe and Northern Asia (excluding China).
