= Hesperentomon chinghaiense =

Scientific classification
- Domain: Eukaryota
- Kingdom: Animalia
- Phylum: Arthropoda
- Order: Protura
- Family: Hesperentomidae
- Genus: Hesperentomon
- Species: H. chinghaiense

Binomial name
- Hesperentomon chinghaiense Yin, 1982

Species of insect-like animal

Hesperentomon chinghaiense is a species of proturan in the family Hesperentomidae. It is found in Southern Asia.
