= Hesperentomon monlunicum =

Scientific classification
- Domain: Eukaryota
- Kingdom: Animalia
- Phylum: Arthropoda
- Order: Protura
- Family: Hesperentomidae
- Genus: Hesperentomon
- Species: H. monlunicum

Binomial name
- Hesperentomon monlunicum Yin, 1984

Species of insect-like animal

Hesperentomon monlunicum is a species of proturan in the family Hesperentomidae. It is found in Southern Asia.
