= Hesperentomon guiyangense =

Scientific classification
- Domain: Eukaryota
- Kingdom: Animalia
- Phylum: Arthropoda
- Order: Protura
- Family: Hesperentomidae
- Genus: Hesperentomon
- Species: H. guiyangense

Binomial name
- Hesperentomon guiyangense Tang & Yin, 1991

Species of insect-like animal

Hesperentomon guiyangense is a species of proturan in the family Hesperentomidae. It is found in Southern Asia.
