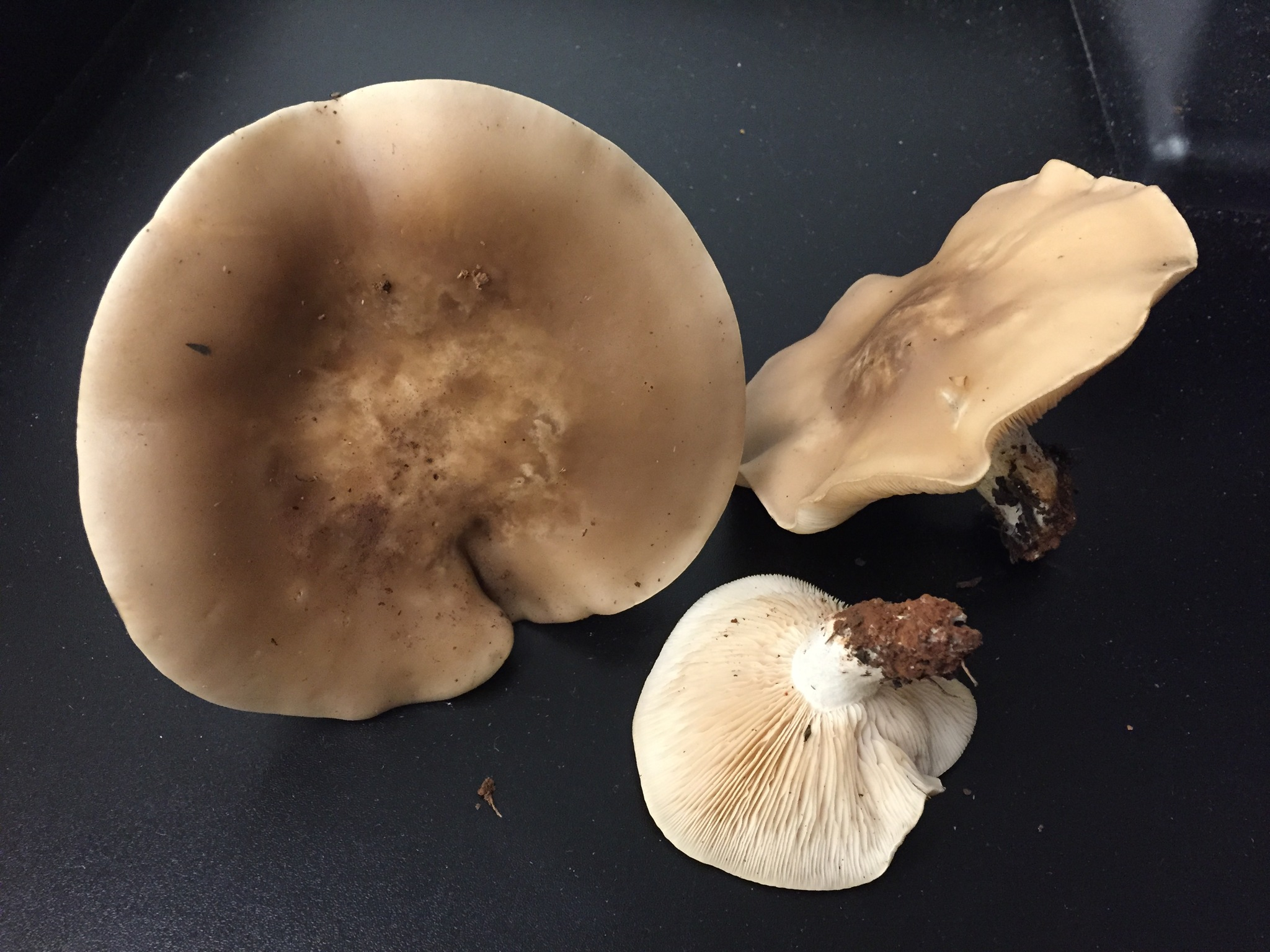
- Placer County, California, 2015

Scientific classification
- Domain: Eukaryota
- Kingdom: Fungi
- Division: Basidiomycota
- Class: Agaricomycetes
- Order: Agaricales
- Family: Clitocybaceae
- Genus: Collybia
- Species: C. brunneocephala

Binomial name
- Collybia brunneocephala H.E. Bigelow, 1982

Synonyms
- Clitocybe brunneocephala Lepista brunneocephala Melanoleuca harperi (Murrill, 1913); Tricholoma harperi

= Collybia brunneocephala =

Species of fungus

Collybia brunneocephala Mycological characteristics
- Gills on hymenium
- Cap is convex or flat
- Hymenium is adnate or decurrent
- Stipe is bare
- Spore print is pink
- Ecology is saprotrophic
- Edibility is choice

Collybia brunneocephala, also known as the brown blewit or brownit, is a species of gilled mushroom. Previously designated Clitocybe brunneocephala, the brownit and its lavender-colored cousin Clitocybe nuda (the wood blewit) were reassigned to the genus Collybia in 2023.

It is found in North America and edible but resembles some poisonous species.

== Taxonomy ==
William Murrill originally described this species in 1913 as a Melanoleuca, based on a specimen collected by R. A. Harper in Alameda County, California. However, based on the minimal information provided, it was not included in later descriptions of Clitocybe species. The brownit was rediscovered by David Arora in Santa Cruz County, California, in the 1970s, and Howard E. Bigelow formally redescribed it in his 1982 Clitocybe monograph using Arora's specimens. There was already a Clitocybe harperi, so the Bigelow gave it a new name suggestive of its brown (brunneo-) head (-cephela). According to recent genetic studies by taxonomists in China, C. brunneocephala belongs to a subgenus designated Leucocalocybe, along with what were formerly designated Lepista personata, Lepista nuda, Lepista fibrosissima, Lepista sordida, and Leucocalocybe mongolica, "forming a strongly supported monophyletic clade (BP = 95%, PP = 1.00)".

== Description ==
As its name implies, the brownit is a brown-capped mushroom with light-beige gills. It is of somewhat stumpy proportions.

The cap is usually described as "lubricious" and often has a rubbery-translucent gloss without being sticky; it is up to 14 centimetres (5 1/2 in) wide. The whitish stem discolors to yellowish where touched; it is up to 6 cm (2 1/4 in) long. The spore print is light pinkish.

=== Similar species ===
The species can be confused with Entoloma lividoalbum, Entoloma sericatum, and Entoloma rhodopolium, all of which are poisonous.

Brownits can also be mistaken for Collybia nuda (which it resembles in both "size and stature") and Clitocybe tarda, but can be distinguished by color and size. Collybia nuda often looks brown in age, but will retain undertones of lilac. Clitocybe tarda mushrooms are smaller than brownits and retain some hint of purple on the cap.

== Distribution and habitat ==
The brownit can be found most frequently from December to March, most commonly in California. Often found in lawns and open meadows, sometimes in fairy rings, it also turns up under California native oaks and Monterey cypress.

== Uses ==
The brownit is considered an excellent edible mushroom.

== See also ==
- Clitocybe violaceifolia
