= Huhentomon =

Scientific classification
- Kingdom: Animalia
- Phylum: Arthropoda
- Class: Entognatha
- Order: Protura
- Family: Hesperentomidae
- Genus: Huhentomon; Yin, 1977

Genus of insect-like animals

Huhentomon is a genus of proturans in the family Hesperentomidae found in China and Japan. There is one species in this genus, Huhentomon plicatunguis.

== Species ==
- Huhentomon plicatunguis Yin, 1977
  - Huhentomon plicatunguis haradai Imadaté, 1989
  - Huhentomon plicatunguis plicatunguis Yin, 1977
