= Blewit =

Two species of edible agarics in the Clitocybe genus

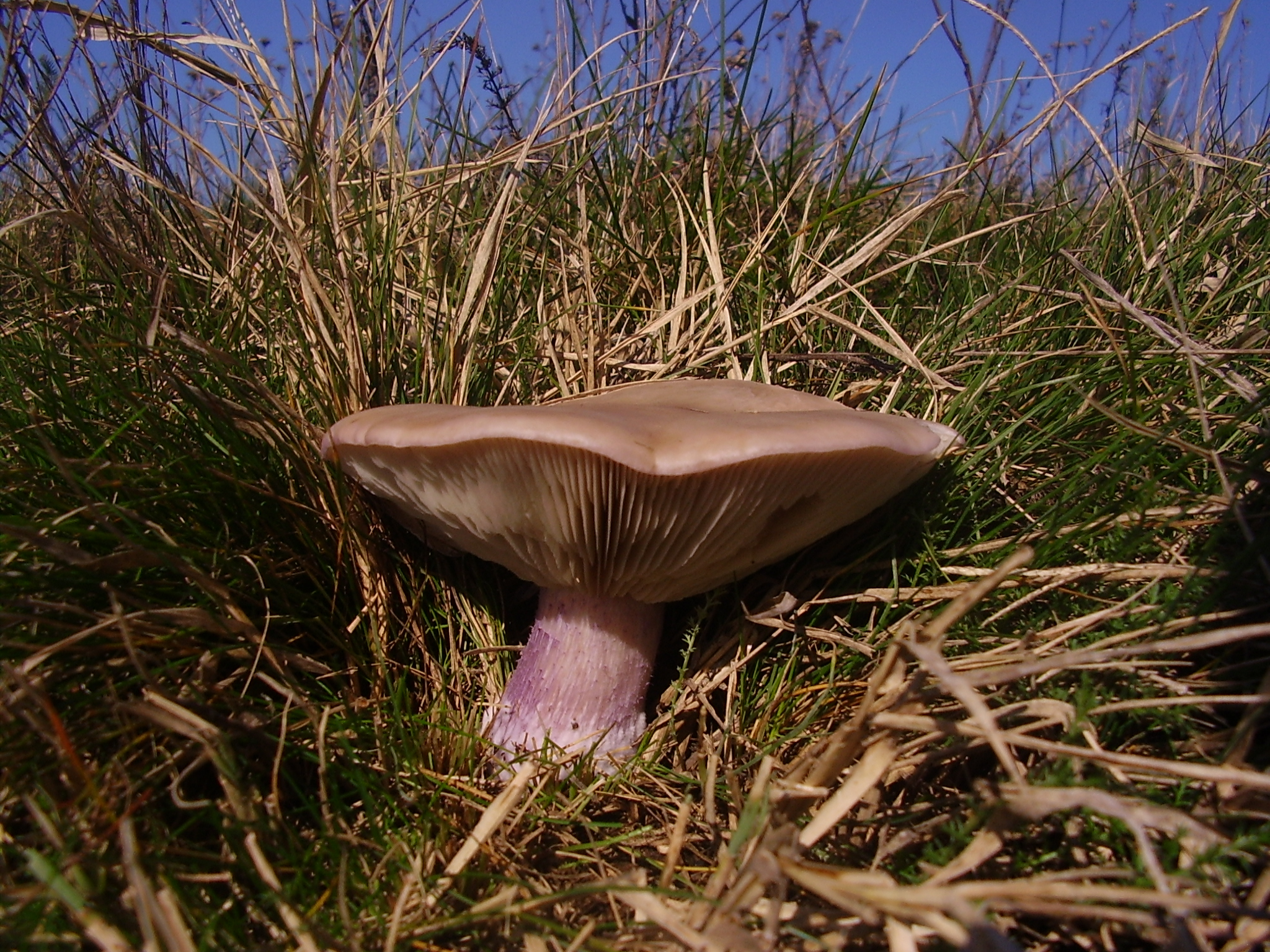
A field blewit

Blewit refers to two closely related species of edible agarics in the genus Collybia, the wood blewit (Collybia nuda, formerly Clitocybe nuda or Lepista nuda) and the field blewit or blue-leg (C. personata, formerly Clitocybe personata, Lepista personata, or Lepista saeva).

== Classification ==
Both species were treated by many authorities as belonging to the genus Lepista. Recent molecular research suggested the genus Lepista is nested within Clitocybe but they were reclassified as Collybia in 2023.

== Edibility ==
Both wood blewits and field blewits are edible.

Field blewits are often infested with fly larvae and do not store very well; they should therefore be used soon after picking. They are also very porous, so they are best picked on a dry day.

The blewits are considered excellent mushrooms, despite their coloration. Blewits can be eaten as a cream sauce or sautéed in butter. They can also be cooked like tripe or as omelette filling, and wood blewits also make good stewing mushrooms.
