= Sinentomon yoroi =

Scientific classification
- Domain: Eukaryota
- Kingdom: Animalia
- Phylum: Arthropoda
- Order: Protura
- Family: Sinentomidae
- Genus: Sinentomon
- Species: S. yoroi

Binomial name
- Sinentomon yoroi Imadaté, 1977

Species of insect-like animal

Sinentomon yoroi is a species of proturan in the family Sinentomidae. It is found in Southern Asia.
