= Fujientomon dicestum =

Scientific classification
- Domain: Eukaryota
- Kingdom: Animalia
- Phylum: Arthropoda
- Order: Protura
- Family: Fujientomidae
- Genus: Fujientomon
- Species: F. dicestum

Binomial name
- Fujientomon dicestum Yin, 1977

Species of insect-like animal

Fujientomon dicestum is a species of proturan in the family Fujientomidae. It is found in Southern Asia.
