= Hesperentomon =

Scientific classification
- Domain: Eukaryota
- Kingdom: Animalia
- Phylum: Arthropoda
- Order: Protura
- Family: Hesperentomidae
- Genus: Hesperentomon; Price, 1960

Genus of insect-like animals

Hesperentomon is a genus of proturans in the family Hesperentomidae.

== Species ==
- Hesperentomon chinghaiense Yin, 1982
- Hesperentomon dianicum Yin, Xie & Imadaté, 1994
- Hesperentomon dunhuaense Bu, Shrubovych & Yin, 2011
- Hesperentomon fopingense Bu, Shrubovych & Yin, 2011
- Hesperentomon guiyangense Tang & Yin, 1991
- Hesperentomon huashanense Yin, 1982
- Hesperentomon kangdingense Tang & Yin, 1988
- Hesperentomon kuratai Imadaté, 1989
- Hesperentomon macswaini Price, 1960
- Hesperentomon martynovae Szeptycki, 1988
- Hesperentomon monlunicum Yin, 1984
- Hesperentomon pectigastrulum Yin, 1984
- Hesperentomon sichuanense Tang & Yin, 1988
- Hesperentomon tianshanicum Martynova, 1970
