= Antelientomon xizangnicum =

Scientific classification
- Domain: Eukaryota
- Kingdom: Animalia
- Phylum: Arthropoda
- Order: Protura
- Family: Antelientomidae
- Genus: Antelientomon
- Species: A. xizangnicum

Binomial name
- Antelientomon xizangnicum Yin, 1990

Species of insect-like animal

Antelientomon xizangnicum is a species of proturan in the family Antelientomidae. It is found in Southern Asia.
