= Fujientomon primum =

Scientific classification
- Domain: Eukaryota
- Kingdom: Animalia
- Phylum: Arthropoda
- Order: Protura
- Family: Fujientomidae
- Genus: Fujientomon
- Species: F. primum

Binomial name
- Fujientomon primum Imadaté, 1964

Species of insect-like animal

Fujientomon primum is a species of proturan in the family Fujientomidae. It is found in Southern Asia.
