= Ionescuellum =

Scientific classification
- Domain: Eukaryota
- Kingdom: Animalia
- Phylum: Arthropoda
- Order: Protura
- Family: Hesperentomidae
- Genus: Ionescuellum; Tuxen, 1960

Genus of insect-like animals

Ionescuellum is a genus of proturans in the family Hesperentomidae, found in Europe.

== Species ==
- Ionescuellum carpaticum (Ionesco, 1930)
- Ionescuellum condei (Nosek, 1965)
- Ionescuellum haybachae (Nosek, 1967)
- Ionescuellum montanum (Gisin, 1945)
- Ionescuellum pseudocarpaticum (Nosek, 1986)
- Ionescuellum schusteri (Nosek, 1977)
- Ionescuellum silvaticum (Rusek, 1965)
- Ionescuellum ulmiacum Rusek & Stumpp, 1989
