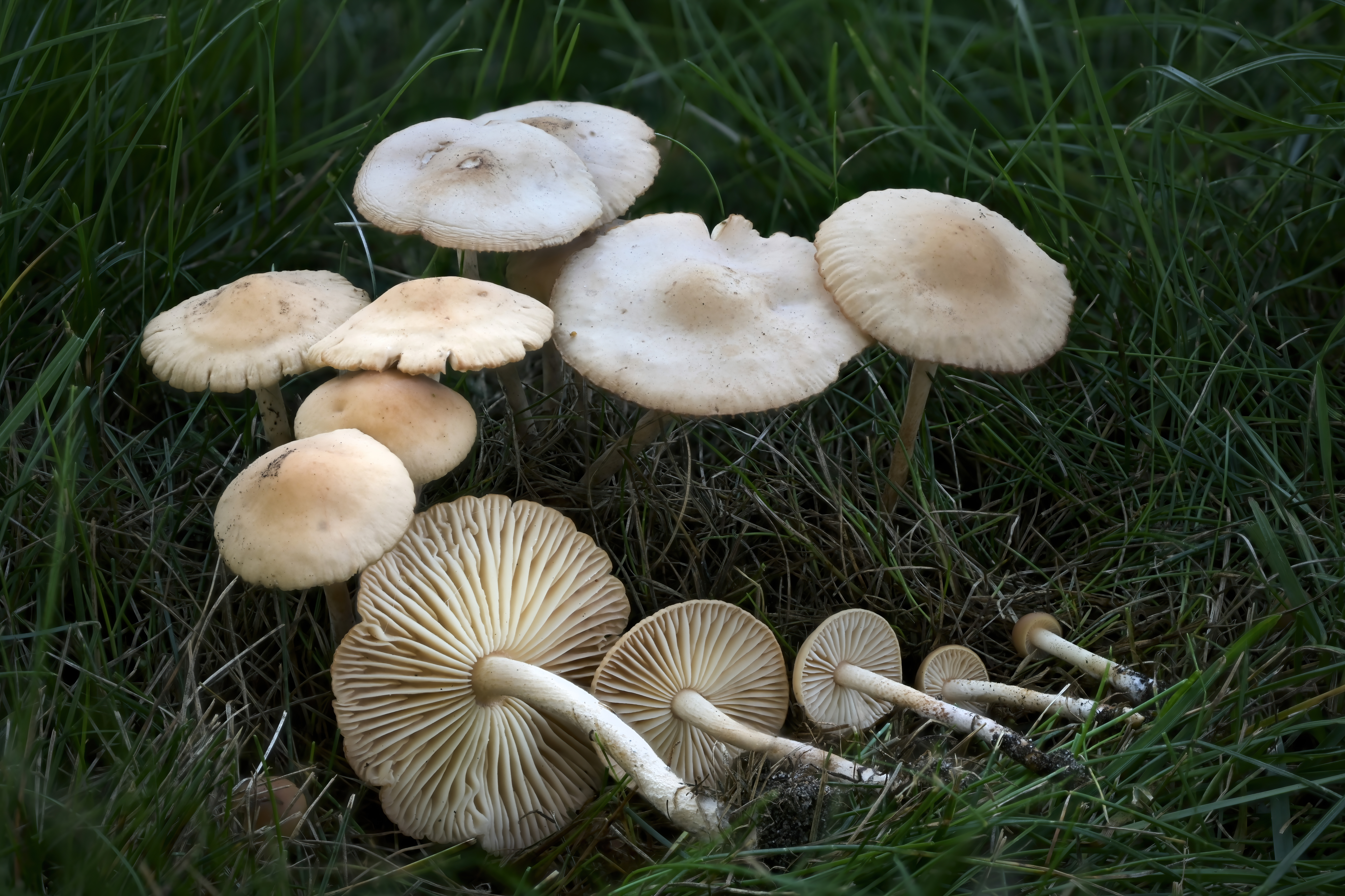

Conservation status
- Secure (NatureServe)

Scientific classification
- Kingdom: Fungi
- Division: Basidiomycota
- Class: Agaricomycetes
- Order: Agaricales
- Family: Marasmiaceae
- Genus: Marasmius
- Species: M. oreades

Binomial name
- Marasmius oreades (Bolton) Fr (1836)

= Marasmius oreades =

Species of fungus

Marasmius oreades
- Mycological characteristics
- Gills on hymenium
- Cap is convex or umbonate
- Hymenium is adnexed
- Stipe is bare
- Spore print is white
- Ecology is saprotrophic
- Edibility is choice

Marasmius oreades, also known as the fairy ring mushroom, fairy ring champignon or Scotch bonnet, is a mushroom native to North America and Europe. Its common names can cause confusion, as many other mushrooms grow in fairy rings, such as the edible Agaricus campestris and the poisonous Chlorophyllum molybdites. It also resembles some toxic species, but is itself a choice edible mushroom.

== Description ==
The cap is 1–5 centimetres (1/2–2 inches) across; it is bell-shaped with a somewhat inrolled margin at first, becoming broadly convex with an even or uplifted margin. It usually retains a slight central bump and is dry, smooth, pale tan or buff (occasionally white), or reddish tan; it usually changes color markedly as it dries out; the margin is sometimes faintly lined.

The bare, pallid, and tough stem grows up to about 2–6 cm (1–2 1/2 in) tall and 2–6 mm (1/16–1/4 in) in diameter.

The gills are attached to the stem or free from it, fairly thick and spaced apart, and white or pale tan, with a cyanide-like odor and producing a white spore print. The spores measure 7–10 μm × 4–6 μm; they are smooth, elliptical, and inamyloid. Cystidia are absent. The pileipellis is hymeniform.

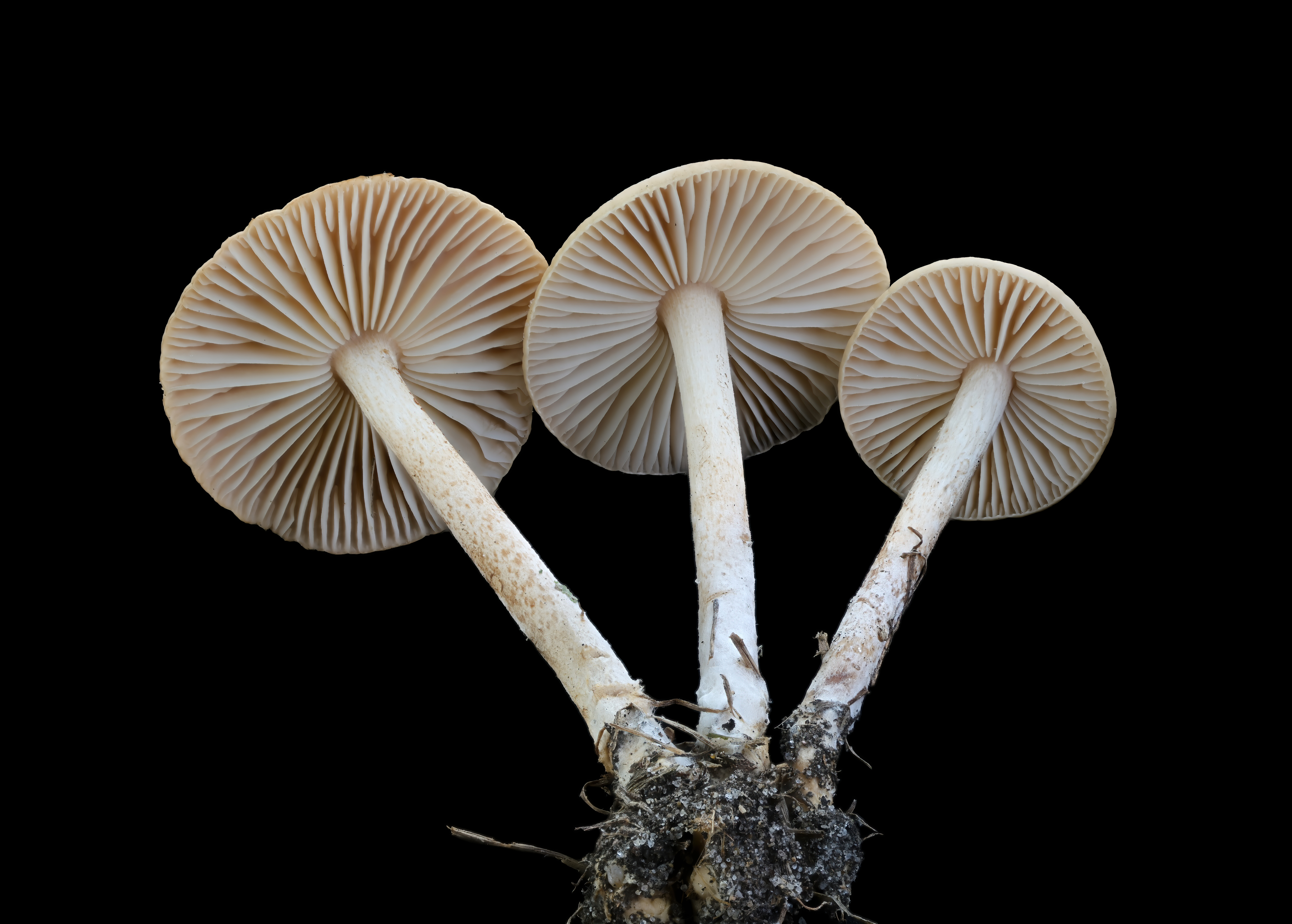
Undersides

=== Similar species ===
It can resemble M. nigrodiscus.

This mushroom can be mistaken for the toxic Clitocybe dealbata or C. rivulosa, which have closely spaced decurrent gills. The latter lacks an umbo and is white to grey in color.

Some species of the Collybia, Marasmiellus, Micromphale, and Strobilurus genera are also similar, sometimes requiring microscopic analysis to differentiate.

== Distribution and habitat ==
Marasmius oreades grows extensively throughout North America, especially the east where they are also more diverse, and Europe in the summer and autumn (May–November in the UK), or year-round in warmer climates. It appears in grassy areas such as lawns, meadows, and even dunes in coastal areas.

It grows in clusters, arcs, or rings. When it grows in rings, it appears as patches of brown grass surrounded by a lush band of darker green grass. The living mycelium at the edge of the ring stimulates grass growth, making it greener, while the dried-out mycelium inside the ring inhibits growth.

== Edibility ==
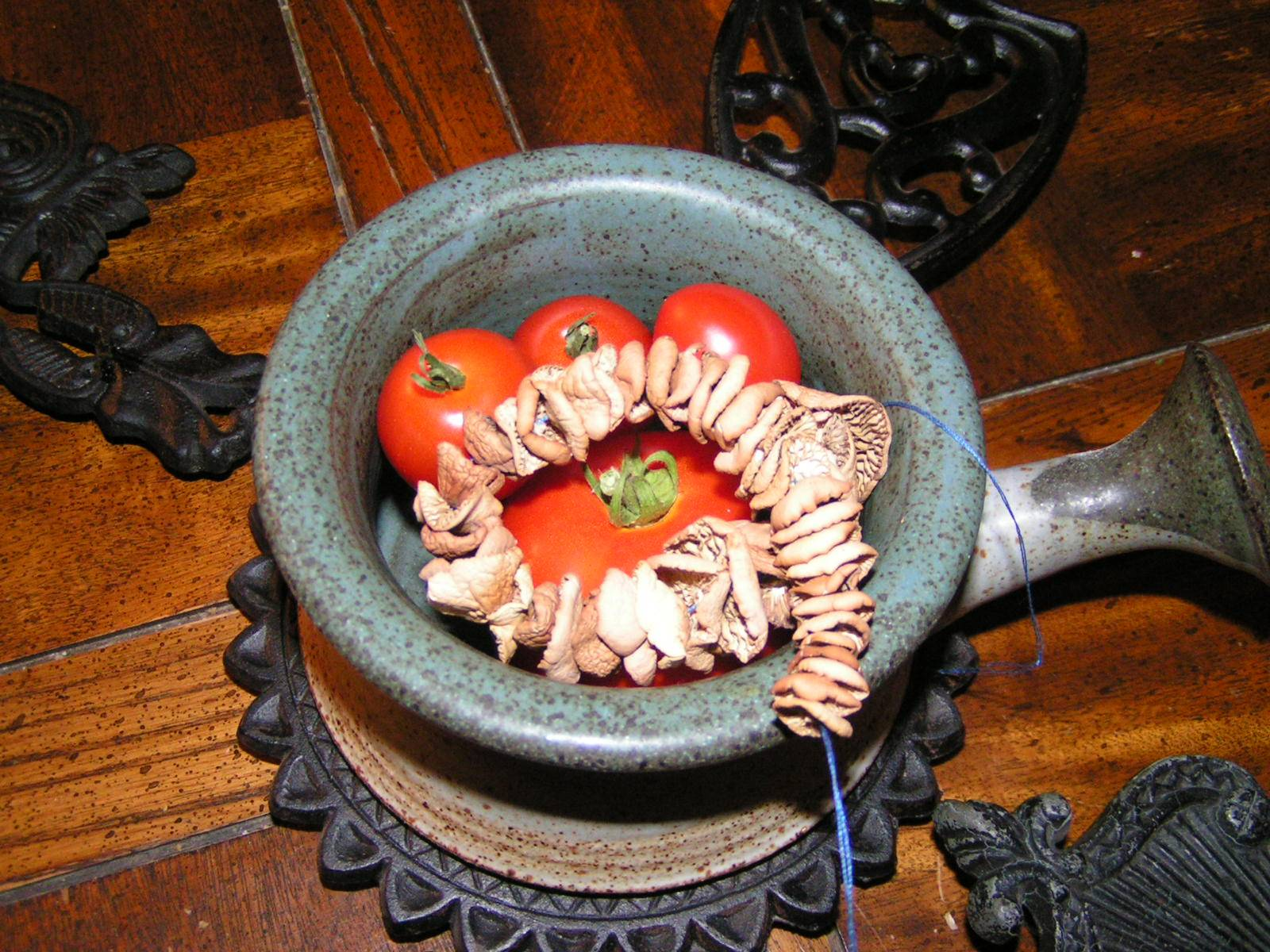
A dried string of the caps

Aside from its similarity to toxic species, M. oreades is a choice edible mushroom. Mycologist David Arora calls it "one of the few [little brown mushrooms] worth learning". The mushroom reportedly has a firm, chewy texture and a meaty, spicy flavor. The mushrooms can be stored dry.

Traditionally, the stems (which tend to be fibrous and unappetizing) are cut off and the caps are threaded and dried in strings. While used in foods such as soups and stews, its sweet taste lends it to baked goods such as cookies. The sweet taste may be due to the presence of trehalose, a type of sugar that allows the mushroom to resist death by desiccation. When exposed to water after being completely dried out, the trehalose is digested as the cells completely revive, causing cellular processes, including the creation of new spores, to begin again.
