= Sinentomon chui =

Scientific classification
- Domain: Eukaryota
- Kingdom: Animalia
- Phylum: Arthropoda
- Order: Protura
- Family: Sinentomidae
- Genus: Sinentomon
- Species: S. chui

Binomial name
- Sinentomon chui Tuxen & Paik, 1982

Species of insect-like animal

Sinentomon chui is a species of proturan in the family Sinentomidae. It is found in Southern Asia.
