= Sinentomon erythranum =

Scientific classification
- Domain: Eukaryota
- Kingdom: Animalia
- Phylum: Arthropoda
- Order: Protura
- Family: Sinentomidae
- Genus: Sinentomon
- Species: S. erythranum

Binomial name
- Sinentomon erythranum Yin, 1965

Species of insect-like animal

Sinentomon erythranum is a species of proturan in the family Sinentomidae. It is found in Southern Asia. Yin (1965) reported it to be widely distributed in the South Chinese provinces of Hainan, Shanghai, Jiangsu, Zhejiang, Anhui, Fujian, Guangxi, Guangdong, Hunan, Guizhou and Yunnan.
