= Antelientomon prodromi =

Scientific classification
- Domain: Eukaryota
- Kingdom: Animalia
- Phylum: Arthropoda
- Order: Protura
- Family: Antelientomidae
- Genus: Antelientomon
- Species: A. prodromi

Binomial name
- Antelientomon prodromi Yin, 1974

Species of insect-like animal

Antelientomon prodromi is a species of proturan in the family Antelientomidae. It is found in Southern Asia.
