= Antelientomon =

Scientific classification
- Domain: Eukaryota
- Kingdom: Animalia
- Phylum: Arthropoda
- Order: Protura
- Family: Antelientomidae; Yin, 1996
- Genus: Antelientomon; Yin, 1974

Genus of arthropods

Antelientomon is a genus of hexapods in the order Protura, and the only genus in the family Antelientomidae. It contains three species.

- Antelientomon guilinicum Zhang & Yin, 1981
- Antelientomon prodromi Yin, 1974
- Antelientomon xizangnicum Yin, 1990
