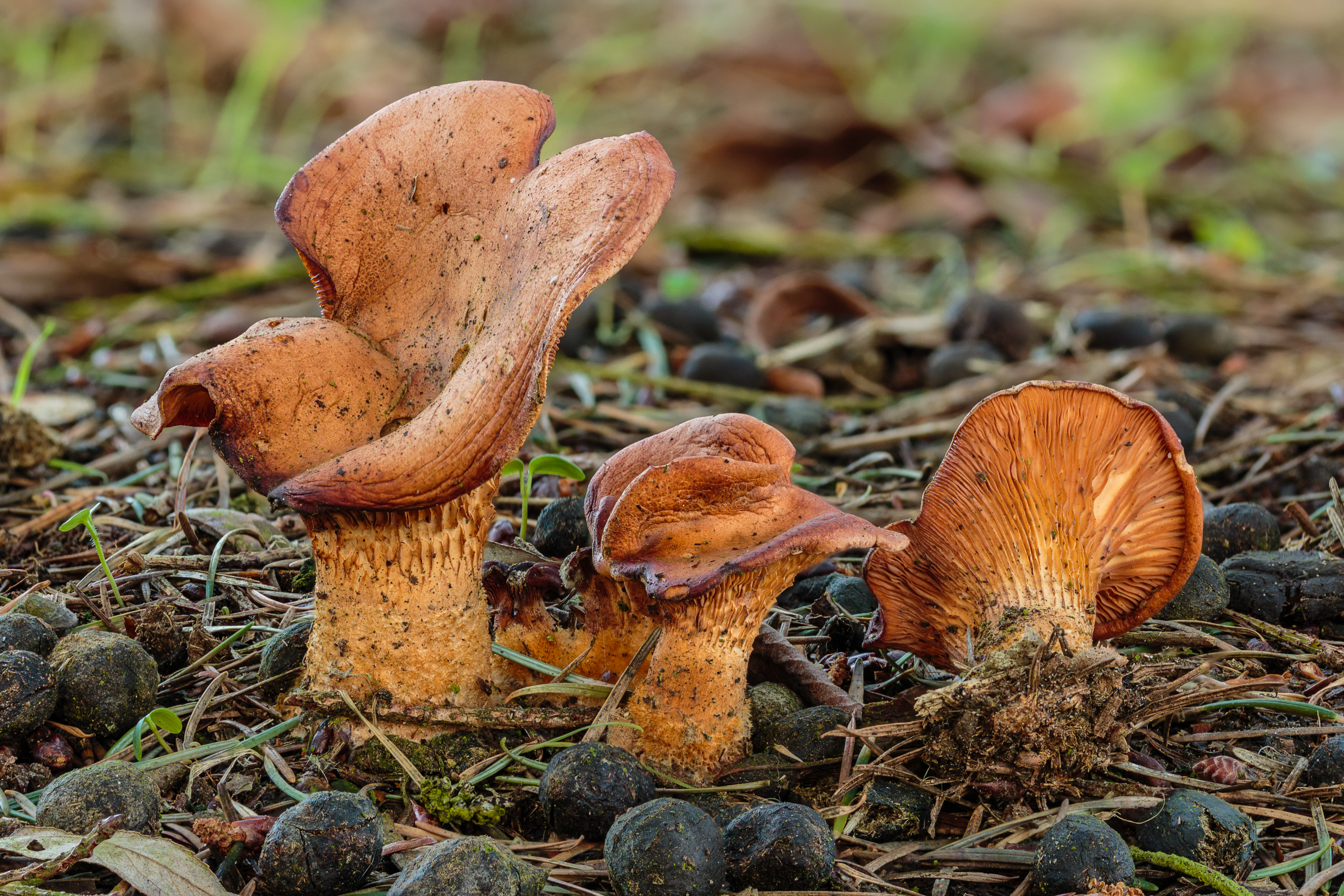
- Lepista flaccida

Scientific classification
- Kingdom: Fungi
- Division: Basidiomycota
- Class: Agaricomycetes
- Order: Agaricales
- Family: Tricholomataceae
- Genus: Lepista (Fr.) W.G.Sm. (1870)

Diversity
- 64 species

= Lepista =

Genus of fungi

Lepista is a genus of mushroom-forming fungi. According to the Dictionary of the Fungi (10th edition, 2008), the widespread genus contains approximately 50 species. In 1969, Howard Bigelow and Alex H. Smith designated the group as subgenus of Clitocybe.

A genetic study conducted in 2015 revealed that the genera Collybia and Lepista were closely related to the core clade of Clitocybe. However, all three genera were found to be polyphyletic, with several members located in lineages distinct from other members within the same genus. Instead, they were more closely related to members of the other two genera. Alvarado and colleagues chose not to define the genera but presented various options and emphasized the necessity for a broader analysis.

== Selected species ==
- Lepista caespitosa
- Lepista glaucocana
- Lepista sordida

=== Former species ===
- Collybia personata, formerly Lepista personata, Lepista saeva, or Clitocybe saeva, field blewit
- Collybia nuda, formerly Lepista nuda or Clitocybe nuda, wood blewit

== See also ==
- List of Tricholomataceae genera
