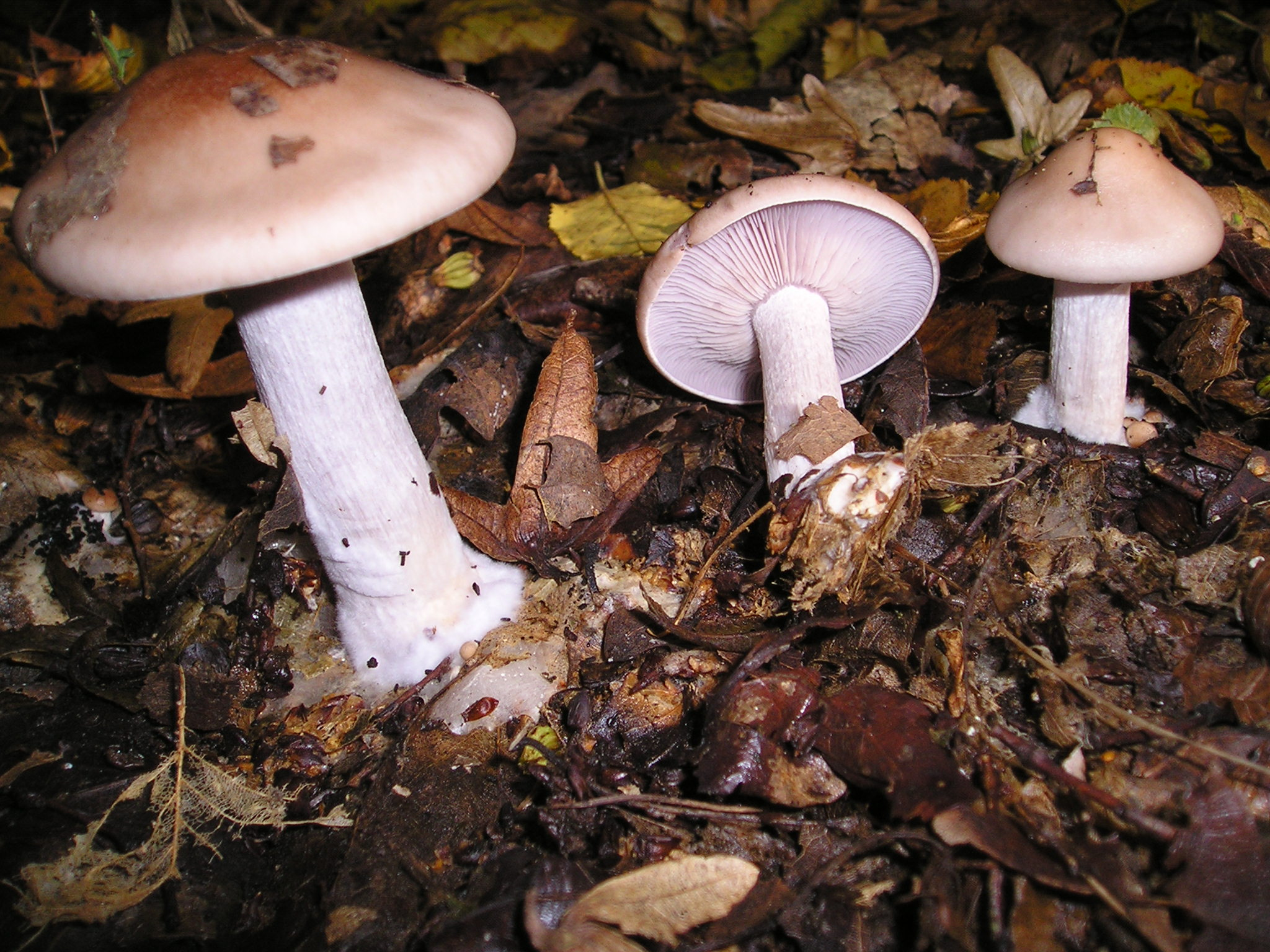

Scientific classification
- Domain: Eukaryota
- Kingdom: Fungi
- Division: Basidiomycota
- Class: Agaricomycetes
- Order: Agaricales
- Family: Tricholomataceae
- Genus: Lepista
- Species: L. glaucocana

Binomial name
- Lepista glaucocana (Bres.) Singer

= Lepista glaucocana =

Species of fungus

Lepista glaucocana is a species of fungus belonging to the family Tricholomataceae.

It is native to Europe and Northern America.
