= Sinentomon =

Scientific classification
- Domain: Eukaryota
- Kingdom: Animalia
- Phylum: Arthropoda
- Order: Protura
- Family: Sinentomidae; Yin, 1965
- Genus: Sinentomon; Yin, 1965

Genus of insect-like animals

Sinentomon is the only genus in the family Sinentomidae, in the hexapod order Protura. It contains three species found in China, Japan, and North Korea.

== Species ==
- Sinentomon chui Tuxen & Paik, 1982
- Sinentomon erythranum Yin, 1965
- Sinentomon yoroi Imadaté, 1977
