= Fujientomon =

Scientific classification
- Domain: Eukaryota
- Kingdom: Animalia
- Phylum: Arthropoda
- Order: Protura
- Family: Fujientomidae; Tuxen & Yin, 1982
- Genus: Fujientomon; Imadaté, 1964

Genus of insect-like animals

Fujientomon is a genus of hexapods in the order Protura, placed in its own family, Fujientomidae. It contains two species found in China and Japan.

Fujientomon was originally described by Imadaté in 1964, and was redescribed by Nakamura in 2014.

== Species ==
- Fujientomon dicestum Yin, 1977
- Fujientomon primum Imadaté, 1964
