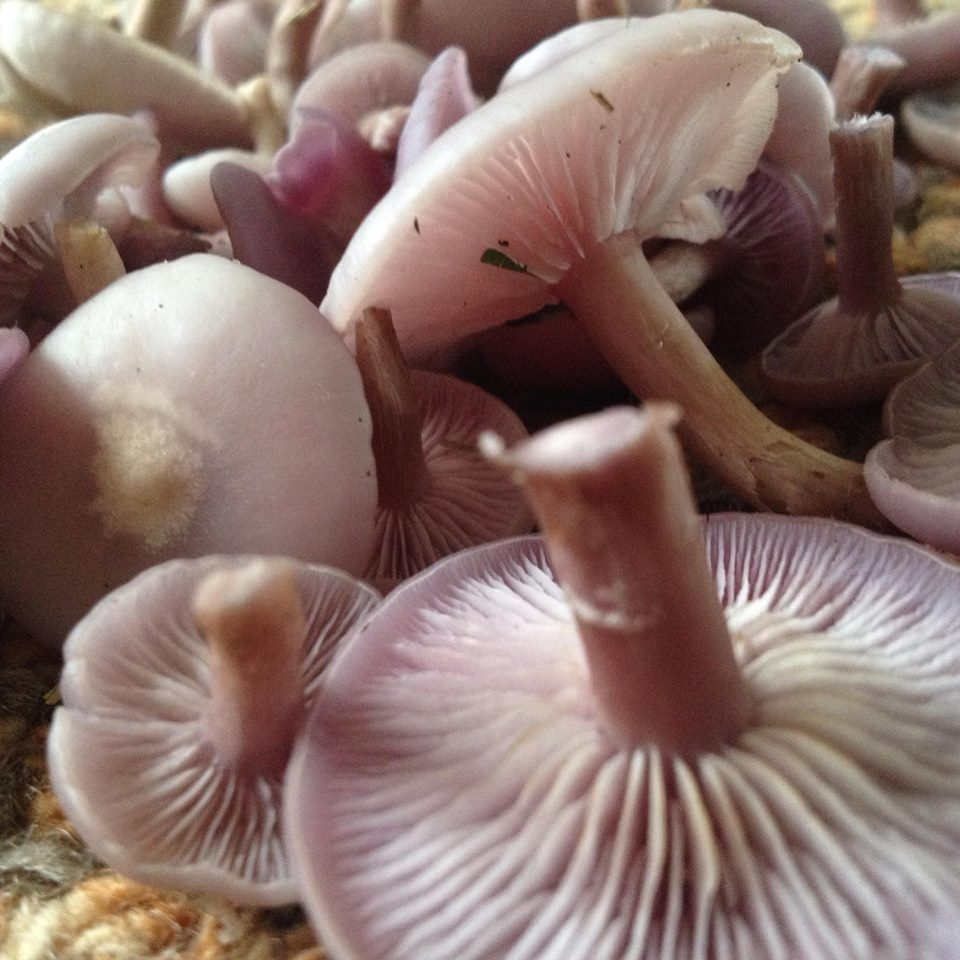

Scientific classification
- Kingdom: Fungi
- Division: Basidiomycota
- Class: Agaricomycetes
- Order: Agaricales
- Family: Clitocybaceae
- Genus: Clitocybe
- Species: C. tarda

Binomial name
- Clitocybe tarda Peck

= Clitocybe tarda =

Species of fungus

Clitocybe tarda
- Mycological characteristics
- Gills on hymenium
- Cap is convex
- Hymenium is adnate or decurrent
- Stipe is bare
- Spore print is pink
- Ecology is saprotrophic
- Edibility is unknown

Clitocybe tarda is a species of mushroom. A 1896 source opined that the mushroom should be called Clitopilus tardus. The species is possibly a synonym of Lepista sordida.

The pinkish caps are 2–8 centimetres (3/4–3 1/4 in) wide and brownish closer to the center. The pale gills usually become more decurrent with age. The stalks are 2–6 cm long and 3–8 mm wide, sometimes with clusters of pale tomentum. The flesh is thin and brittle, and the cap tastes bitter. The spore print is pinkish. It resembles Laccaria sp., Collybia nuda and C. brunneocephala.

Clusters of this species can be found in areas that are used for agriculture or filled with grass. It can be found from July to November in southeastern North America, and October to December on the West Coast.

It has been claimed as edible, but is difficult to identify, is unsubstantial, and does not have a pleasant taste.
