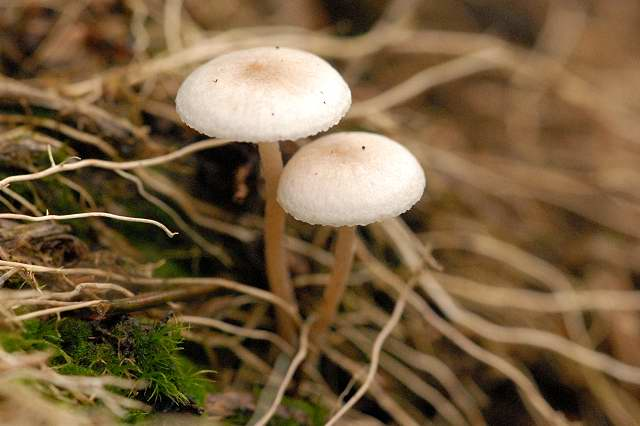
- Collybia cookei

Scientific classification
- Kingdom: Fungi
- Division: Basidiomycota
- Class: Agaricomycetes
- Order: Agaricales
- Family: Clitocybaceae
- Genus: Collybia (Fries) Staude

Type species
- Collybia tuberosa (Bull.) P. Kumm.

Subgenera
- Collybia; Crassicybe; Leucocalocybe; Macrosporocybe

= Collybia =

Genus of fungi

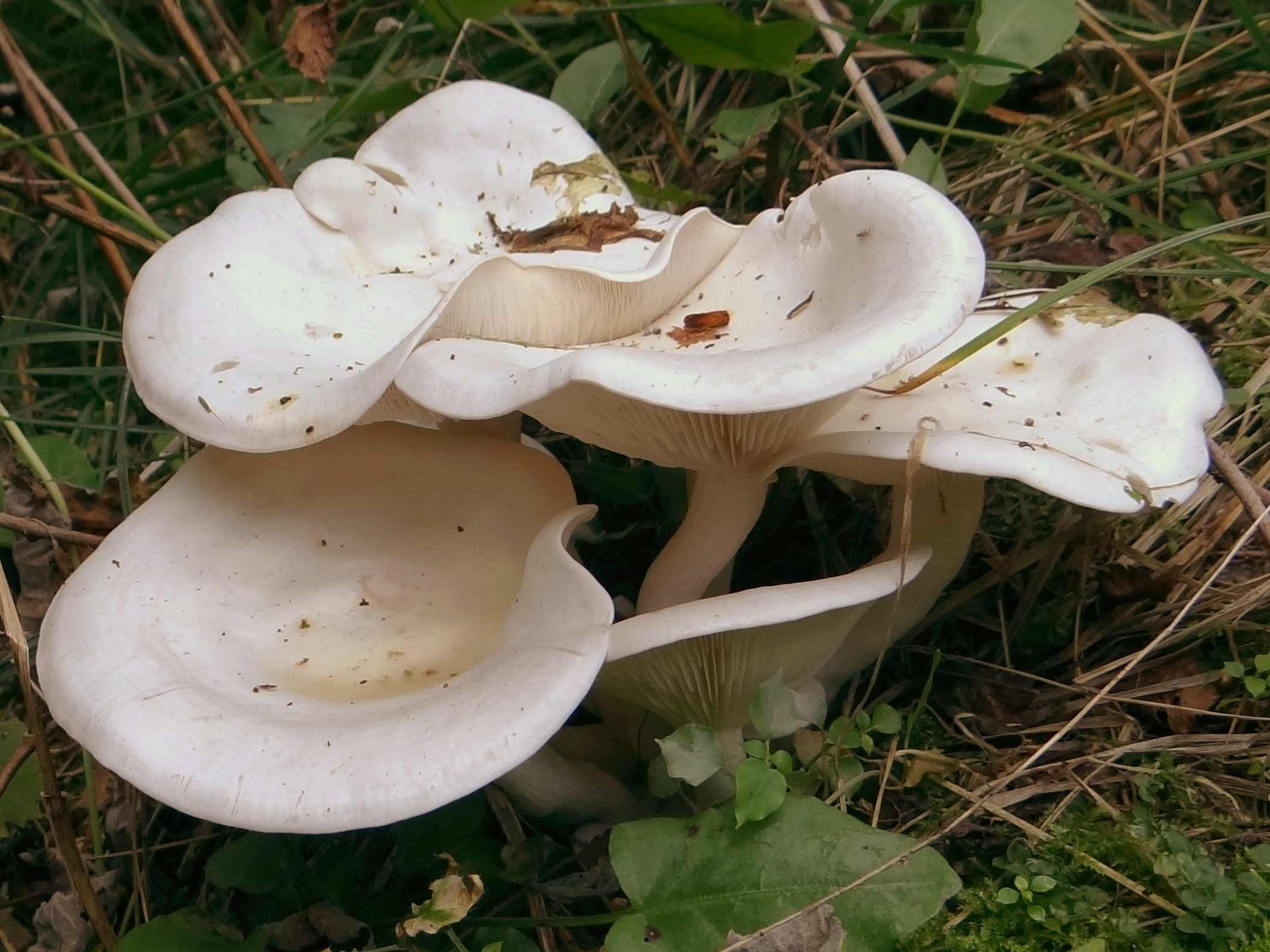
Collybia phyllophila, the frosty funnel

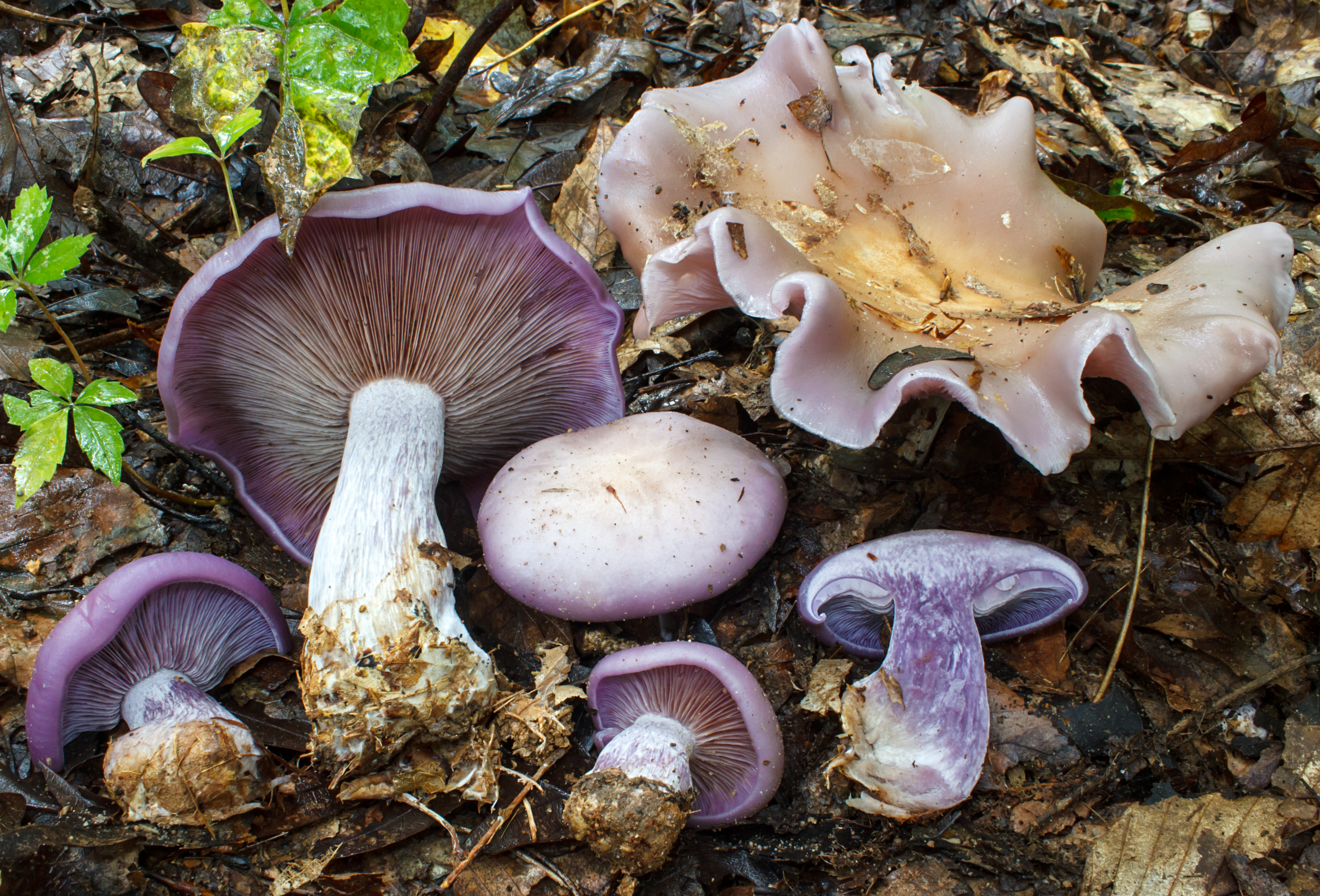
Collybia nuda, the blewit

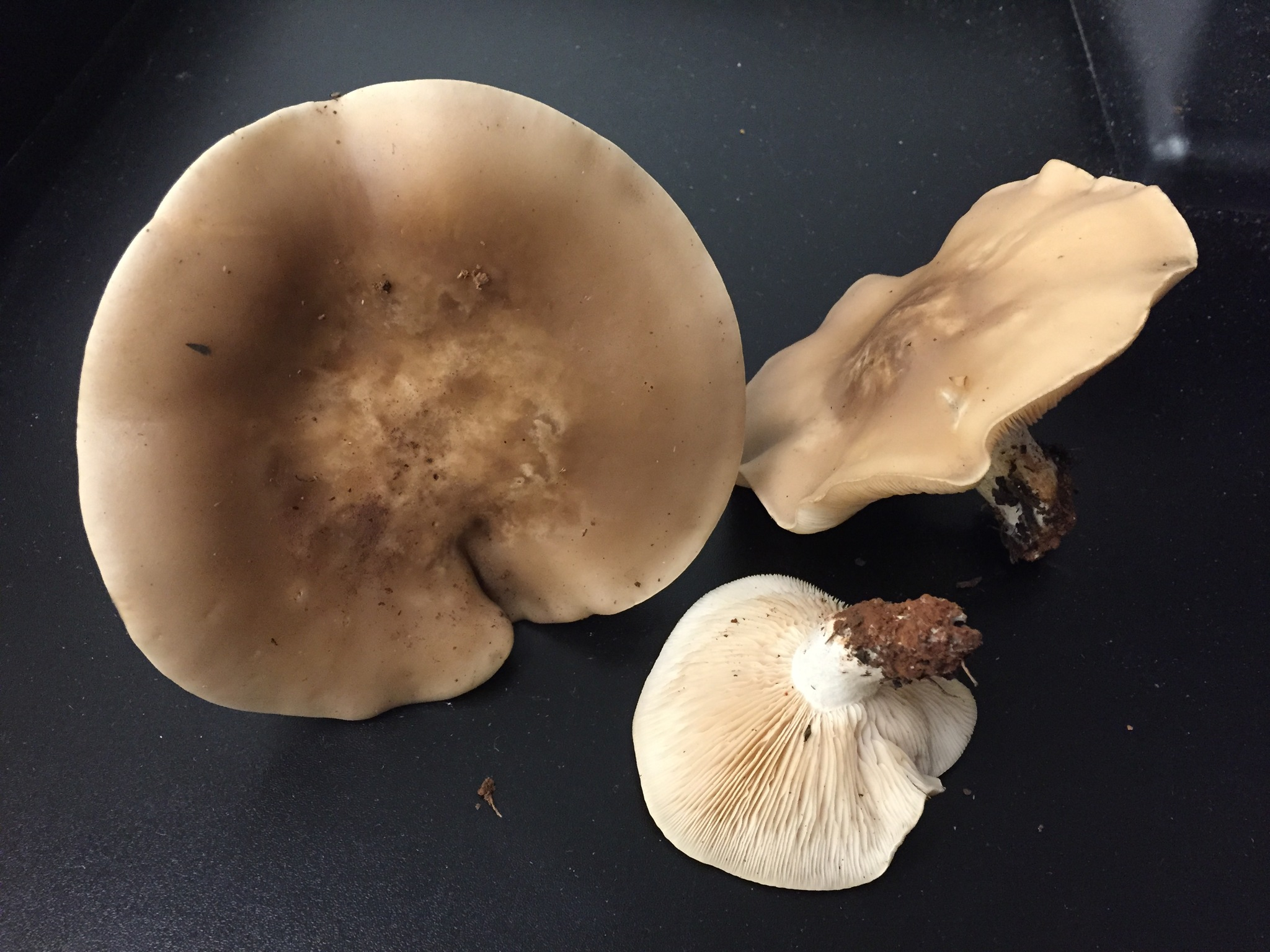
Collybia brunneocephala, the brown blewit

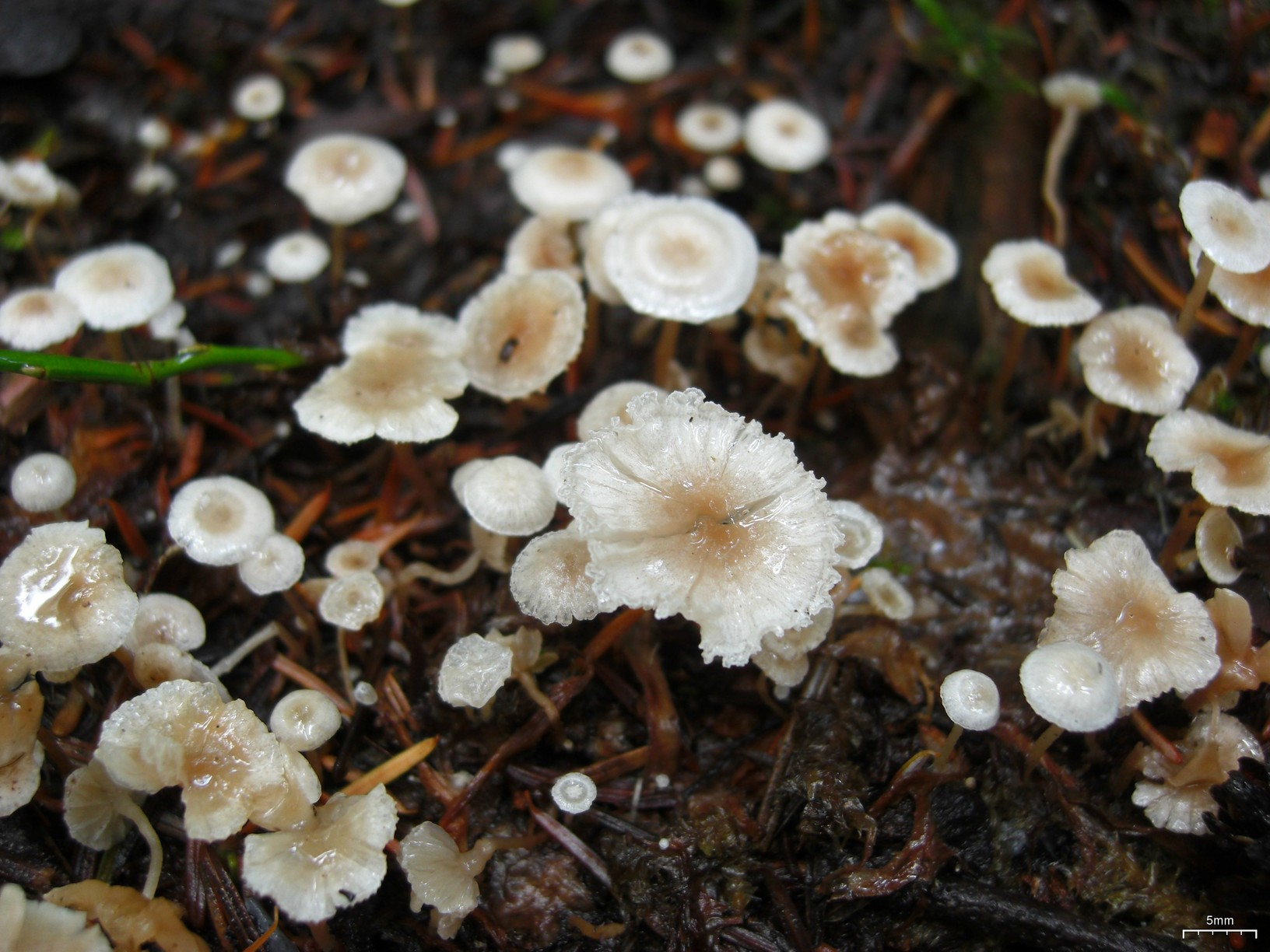
Collybia cirrhata, the piggyback shanklet

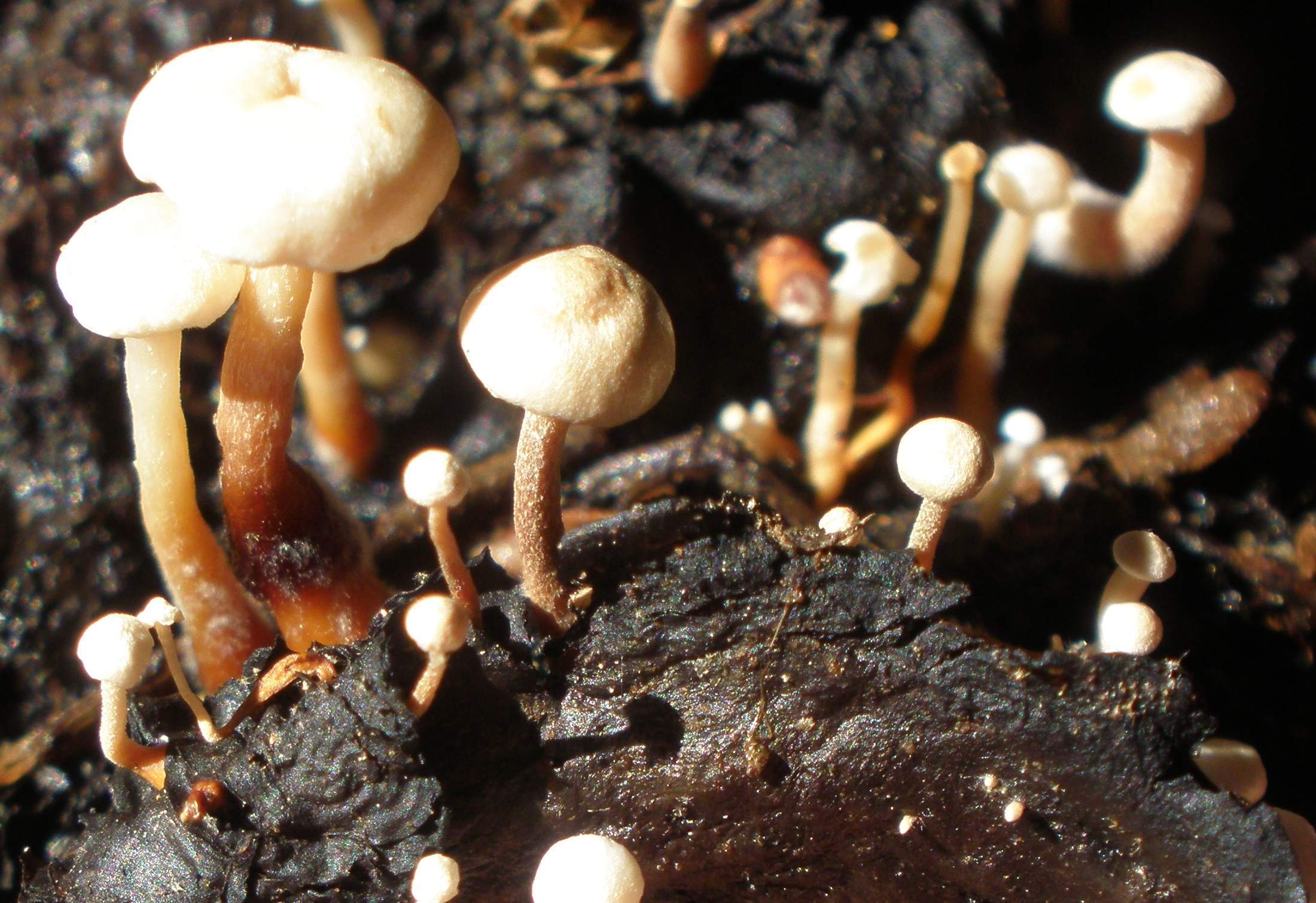
Collybia tuberosa, the lentil shanklet, grows on the decaying remains of other fungi or vegetation

Collybia (in the strict sense) is a genus of mushrooms in the family Clitocybaceae. The genus has a widespread distribution in northern temperate areas, and contains well known species like the blewit, sordid blewit, and frosty funnel, as well as various species that grow on the decomposing remains of other mushrooms. The name Collybia means "small coin".

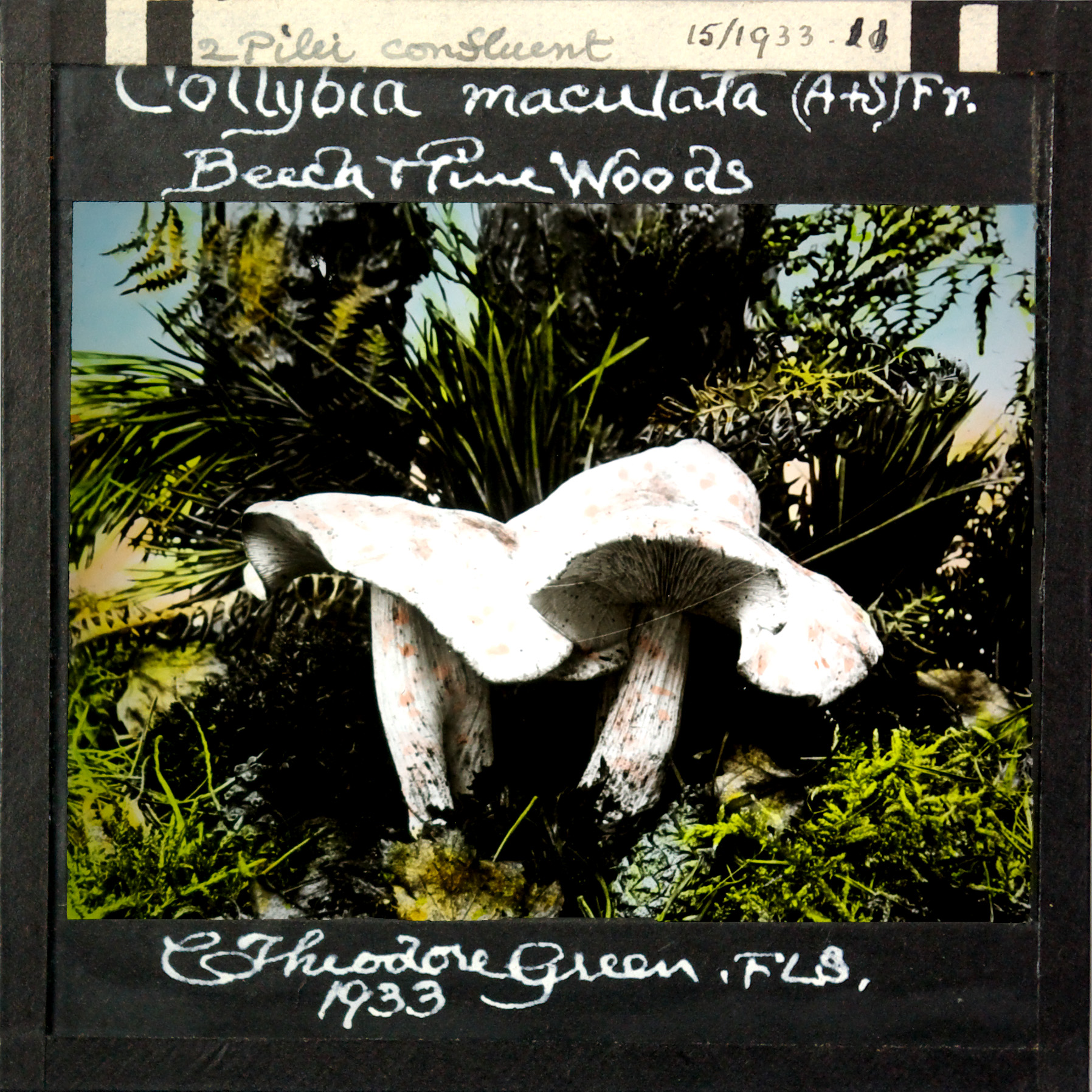
Image of a "Collybia maculata", now Rhodocollybia maculata from 1933

== History of taxonomy ==
Until recently a large number of other white-spored species, some very common, were assigned to this genus, but the majority have been separated into other genera: Gymnopus, Rhodocollybia and Dendrocollybia, leaving the genus with only three species. Later, research published in 2023 reassigned a number of species previously considered to be in the genus Clitocybe to the genus Collybia, including the edible blewit and brownit mushrooms, expanding the genus once again.

=== Collybia sensu lato (1820s to 1990s) ===
Collybia sensu lato is one of the groups of fungi of the order Agaricales that has created taxonomic differences of opinion in the scientific community. The generic name Collybia is due to Elias Magnus Fries and first appeared in 1821. Collybia was originally a tribe from an Agaricus classification. In 1857, Friedrich Staude recognized Collybia as a genus. Later in his systematic work of 1838, Fries characterized Collybia as those species with:

1. white spores,
2. incurved cap margin,
3. central cartilaginous stipe, and
4. fruit bodies which decay easily ("putrescent").

The last criterion divided these mushrooms from those of Marasmius, which had the property of being able to revive after having dried out (called "marcescent"). Although Fries considered this an important characteristic, some later authors like Charles Horton Peck (1897) and Calvin Henry Kauffman (1918) did not agree with Fries's criteria for the classification, and Gilliam (1976) discarded marcescence as a characteristic for the identification and differentiation of these genera.

At that point, the very varied genus encompassed the modern genera Oudemansiella (including Xerula), Crinipellis, Flammulina, Calocybe, Lyophyllum, Tephrocybe, Strobilurus, and others.

Adults of the pleasing fungus beetles Tritoma biguttata biguttata and T.humeralis have been from an unidentified "Collybia", but these records might just as well refer to any of the species now moved elsewhere; in any case, it does not seem to be a regular food source for these beetles.

=== Collybia sensu stricto (1990s to 2023) ===
In 1993, Vladimír Antonín and Machiel Noordeloos published the first part of a monograph of the genera Marasmius and Collybia after conducting a survey of these genera in Europe. In 1997, they published the second part of the monograph that included all Collybia species. In 1997, Antonín and colleagues published a generic concept within these two genera and organized the nomenclature to provide a new combination of genera: Gymnopus, Collybia, Dendrocollybia, Rhodocollybia and Marasmiellus.

The nomenclature and reclassification have since been supported by subsequent molecular analysis. Most of these mushrooms belong to the family Marasmiaceae and have low convex caps and white gills, with adnate attachment to the stem. This general form has given rise to the term collybioid, which is still in use to describe this type of fruit body.

The type species for Collybia sensu stricto is C. tuberosa, a small white parasitic mushroom (with caps up to 1.5 cm (0.6 in)) which develops from a reddish-brown apple seed-shaped sclerotium in and on putrescent fungi or remains in soil after complete decay of the host tissue.

The three species remaining in the genus (C. cirrhata, C. cookei, and C. tuberosa) are small, up to 2 cm (0.8 in). The caps are whitish and often radially wrinkled. All three species are saprobic, and grow on the decomposing remains of other mushrooms. When the genus was split up, the much-reduced genus was moved from Marasmiaceae to Tricholomataceae.

=== Expansion of Collybia in 2023 ===
In 2023, Zheng-Mi He et al. published a molecular phylogenetics and phylogenomics study exploring the phylogenetic relationships and evolutionary history of the family Clitocybaceae, resulting in a large scale expansion of the genus Collybia to include many species previously classified as Clitocybe. He and colleagues also divided the genus into 4 subgenera: Collybia (containing, among others, the three original species of Collybia sensu stricto), Leucocalocybe (containing the well known blewits), Crassicybe, and Macrosporocybe. The genus now includes these species:

- subgenus Collybia
  - Collybia alboclitocyboides
  - Collybia aperta
  - Collybia asiatica
  - Collybia bisterigmata
  - Collybia brunneoumbilicata
  - Collybia cirrhata ― piggyback shanklet
  - Collybia cookei ― split-pea shanklet
  - Collybia dealbata
  - Collybia dryadicola
  - Collybia humida
  - Collybia hunanensis
  - Collybia odora ― aniseed funnel
  - Collybia pannosa
  - Collybia petaloidea
  - Collybia phyllophila ― frosty funnel
  - Collybia piceata
  - Collybia rivulosa
  - Collybia subtropica
  - Collybia tibetica
  - Collybia tomentostipes
  - Collybia tuberosa ― lentil shanklet
  - Collybia xylogena
- subgenus Crassicybe
  - Collybia irina
- subgenus Leucocalocybe
  - Collybia brunneocephala ― brown blewit
  - Collybia fibrosissima
  - Collybia mongolica
  - Collybia nuda ― blewit
  - Collybia personata ― field blewit
  - Collybia sordida ― sordid blewit
- subgenus Macrosporocybe
  - Collybia striaticeps

== See also ==
- List of Tricholomataceae genera
- List of Marasmiaceae genera
