= Pseudoculus =

In biology, pseudoculus (plural pseudoculi, from Greek ψεύδος 'false' and Latin oculus 'eye') is the name applied to various eye-like structures which are nevertheless not eyes. Amongst the organisms possessing pseudoculi are Protura, in which their function is not well-known, and Pauropoda, whose organs are vibration-sensitive.
