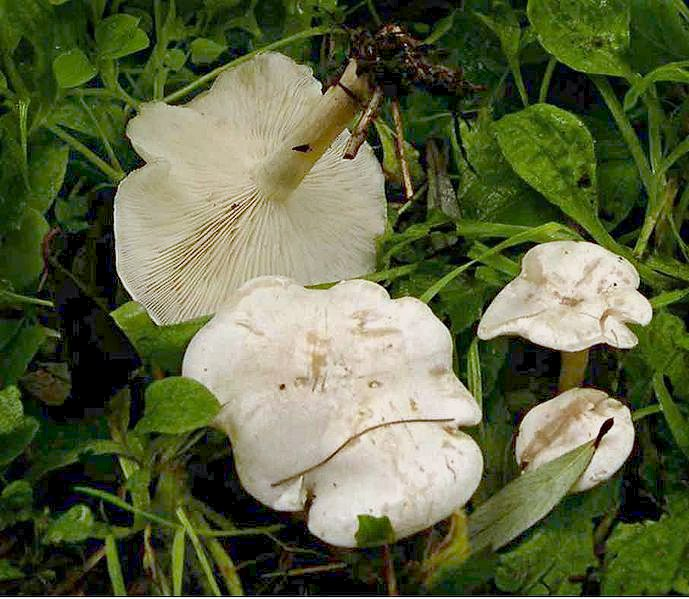

Scientific classification
- Kingdom: Fungi
- Division: Basidiomycota
- Class: Agaricomycetes
- Order: Agaricales
- Family: Clitocybaceae
- Genus: Clitocybe
- Species: C. dealbata

Binomial name
- Clitocybe dealbata (Sowerby) Gillet (1874)

= Clitocybe dealbata =

Species of fungus

Clitocybe dealbata Mycological characteristics
- Gills on hymenium
- Cap is depressed
- Hymenium is adnate
- Stipe is bare
- Spore print is white
- Ecology is saprotrophic
- Edibility is poisonous or deadly

Clitocybe dealbata, also known as the ivory funnel, is a small white funnel-shaped basidiomycete fungus widely found in lawns, meadows and other grassy areas in Europe and North America.

Also known as the sweating mushroom, or sweat producing clitocybe, it derives these names from the symptoms of poisoning. It contains potentially deadly levels of muscarine.

== Taxonomy ==
Clitocybe dealbata was initially described by British naturalist James Sowerby in 1799 as Agaricus dealbatus, its specific epithet derived from the Late Latin verb dealbare 'to whitewash', inexorably calling to mind the Biblical "whited sepulchre", that is outwardly pleasing but inwardly toxic. It gained its current genus name in 1874 when reclassified by French naturalist Claude Casimir Gillet. However, this species is often considered a synonym of Clitocybe rivulosa and according to Bon the name C. dealbata may be invalid (a nomen dubium) as James Sowerby's definition conflicts with Elias Magnus Fries's.

== Description ==
A small white or white dusted with buff-coloured mushroom, the 2–4 cm diameter cap is flattened to depressed with adnate to decurrent crowded white gills. The stipe is 2–4 cm tall and 0.5–1 cm wide. The spore print is white. There is no distinctive taste or smell.

It is one of a number of similar poisonous species such as the false champignon (Clitocybe rivulosa) which can be confused with the edible fairy ring champignon (Marasmius oreades), or miller (Clitopilus prunulus).

== Distribution and habitat ==
The ivory funnel is found in grassy habitats in summer and autumn. Often gregarious, it can form fairy rings. Unfortunately, they often occur in grassy areas where they may be encountered by children or pets. This may increase risk of accidental consumption.

== Toxicity ==
The main toxic component of Clitocybe dealbata is muscarine, and thus the symptoms are like those of nerve agent poisoning, namely greatly increased salivation, sweating (perspiration), and the flow of tears (lacrimation) within 15–30 minutes of ingestion. With large doses, these symptoms may be followed by abdominal pain, severe nausea, diarrhea, blurred vision, and labored breathing. Intoxication generally subsides within two hours. Death is rare, but may result from arrhythmia or respiratory failure in severe cases. The specific antidotes are M1 receptor blockers like atropine, scopolamine and diphenhydramine.

== See also ==
- List of deadly fungi
