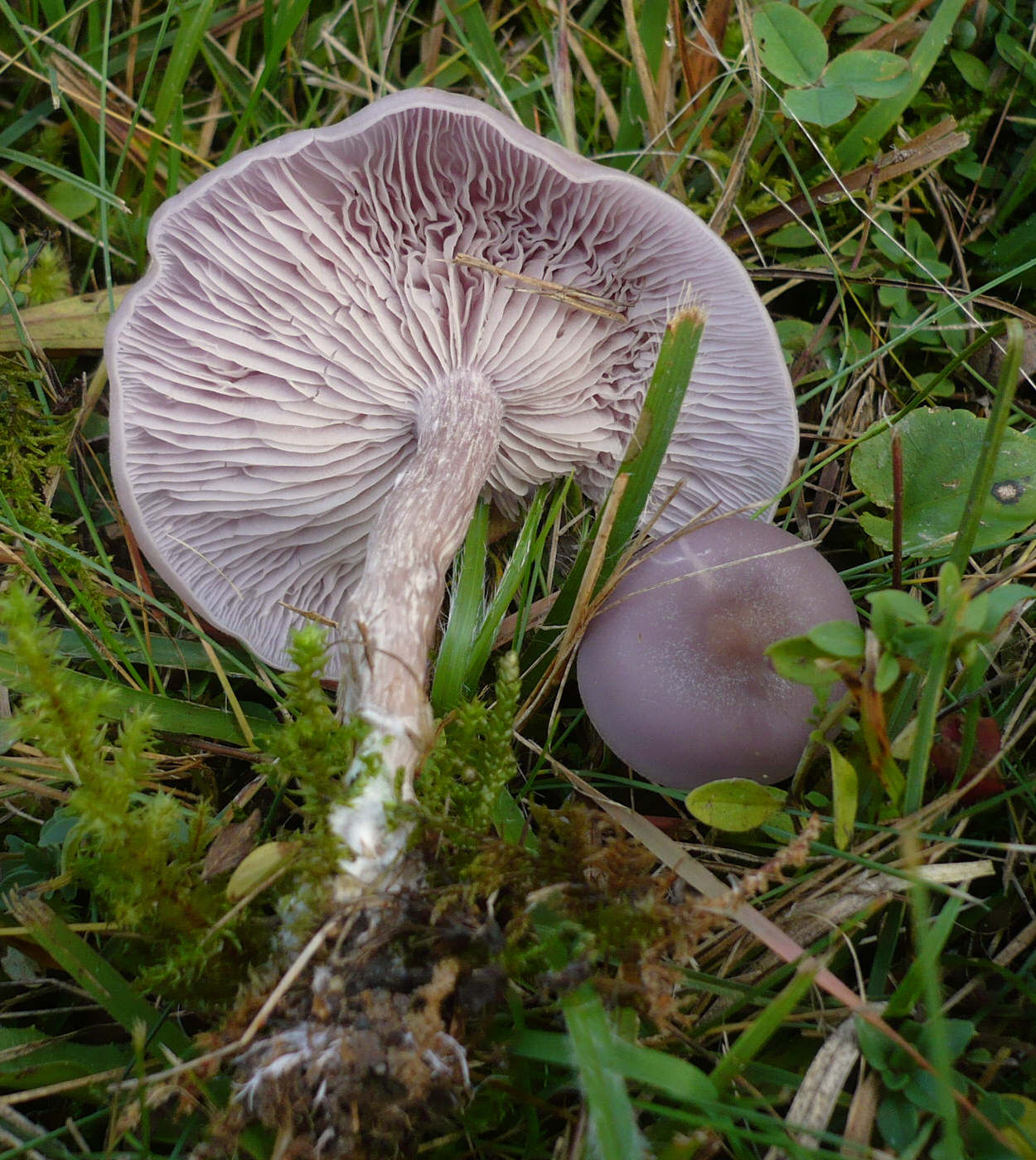

Scientific classification
- Kingdom: Fungi
- Division: Basidiomycota
- Class: Agaricomycetes
- Order: Agaricales
- Family: Clitocybaceae
- Genus: Collybia
- Species: C. sordida

Binomial name
- Collybia sordida (Schumach.) Singer

Synonyms
- Agaricus sordidus Melanoleuca sordida (Schumach.) Murrill; Rhodopaxillus sordidus (Schumach.) Maire; Tricholoma sordidum (Schumach.) P. Kumm. Gyrophila sordida (Schumach.) Quél.

= Collybia sordida =

Species of fungus

Collybia sordida, formerly Lepista sordida, is a species of blewit mushroom found across the Northern Hemisphere. It is known to form fairy rings.
