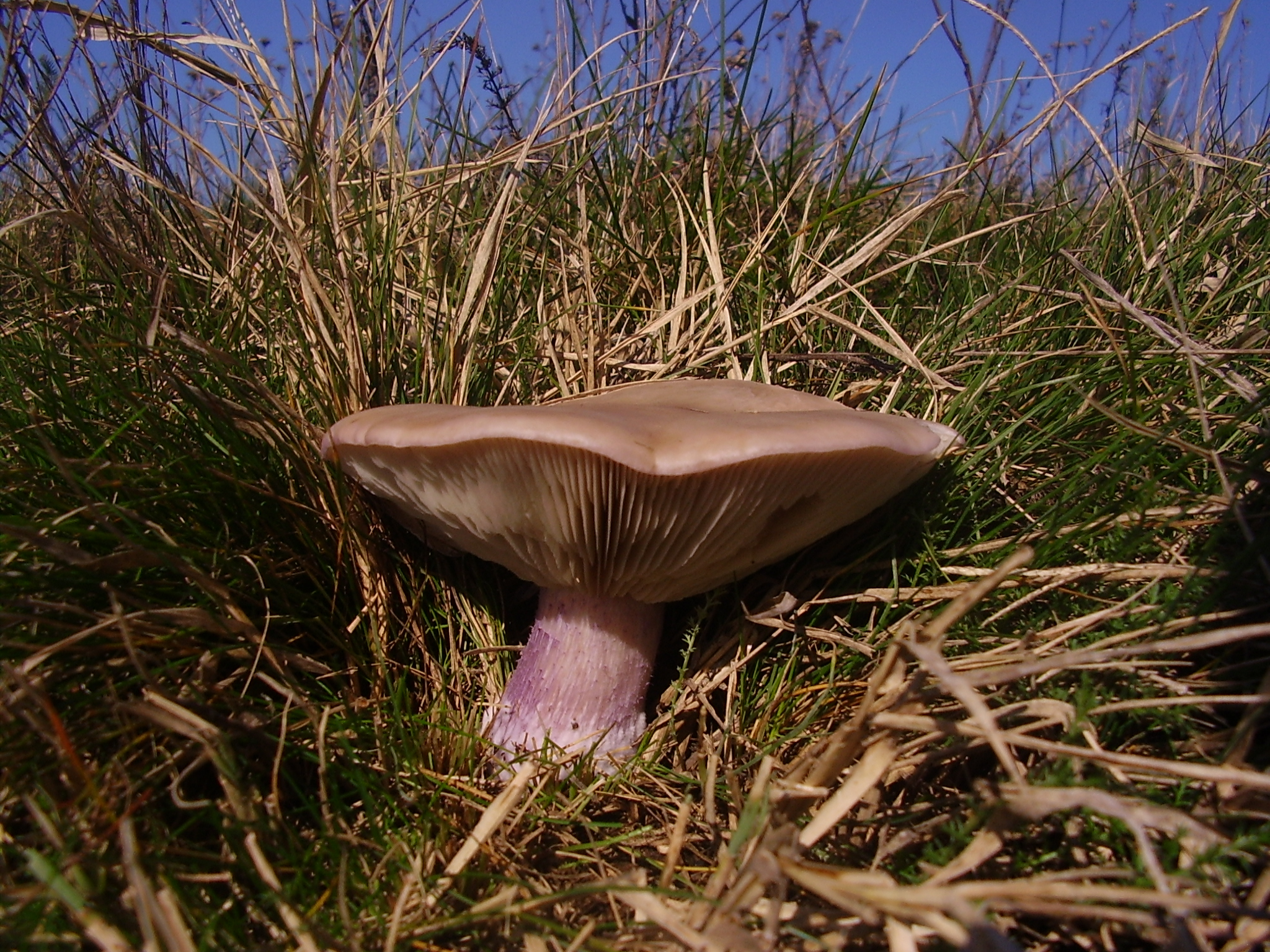
- Field blewit (Collybia personata) in its natural habitat

Scientific classification
- Kingdom: Fungi
- Division: Basidiomycota
- Class: Agaricomycetes
- Order: Agaricales
- Family: Clitocybaceae
- Genus: Collybia
- Species: C. personata

Binomial name
- Collybia personata (Fr.) Cooke

Synonyms
- Lepista saeva Lepista personata Clitocybe saeva Tricholoma amethystinum Tricholoma personatum Tricholoma personatum f. minor Tricholoma personatum var. anserina Tricholoma personatum var. saevum Tricholoma saevum Rhodopaxillus personatus Rhodopaxillus saevus Agaricus anserinus Agaricus personatus β saevus

= Collybia personata =

Species of fungus

Collybia personata
- Mycological characteristics
- Gills on hymenium
- Cap is convex or flat
- Hymenium is emarginate
- Stipe is bare
- Spore print is pink
- Ecology is saprotrophic
- Edibility is choice

Collybia personata (also recognised as Lepista personata, Lepista saeva, Clitocybe saeva and Tricholoma personatum, and commonly known as the field blewit and blue-leg) is a species of edible fungus commonly found growing in grassy areas across Europe.

== Taxonomy ==
This species was originally proclaimed by Elias Fries in 1818, as Agaricus personatus. Cooke proposed in 1871 another name still in use until recently — Lepista personata. Other names were to follow, namely Lepista saeva by P. D. Orton in 1960 and Clitocybe saeva by H. E. Bigelow & A. H. Smith in 1969, the latter placing the fungus in the larger genus Clitocybe. In Latin, the specific epithet sævus is an adjective meaning either fierce, outrageous, angry or strong. Likewise, personatus is a participle meaning disguised, pretended or false.

Along with Collybia nuda (formerly Lepista nuda), the species was moved to the genus Collybia in 2023.

== Description ==
The fruiting body of the mushroom resembles an agaric. The cap is at first hemispherical or convex, becoming flat to slightly concave with maturity, up to 12 centimetres (4 3/4 in) in diameter. The cap cuticle is colored cream to light brown with a smooth texture to the touch and is often seen glistening when fresh. Along the periphery, the cap ends in a thick incurved margin which may unfold as the mushroom expands. The white to pallid flesh is thick, firm and delicate upon slicing. The underside of the cap bears crowded pinkish, cream to light brown gills, which are free or emarginate in relation to the stem.

The stem is cylindrical with a bulbous, or sometimes tapering base, and does not bear a ring. The stem is covered by a striking lavender or lilac-coloured fibrous skin which fades in older individuals, and has a thick, firm flesh concolorous with that of the cap. It is up to 3–7 cm (1 1/4–2 3/4 in) tall and 1–3 cm (1/2–1 1/4 in) in diameter.

Under a light microscope, the spores are seen hyaline to pink, ellipsoid in shape, and with fine warts. The spore dimensions are 6–8 by 4–5 μm. The species produces a pale pink spore print.

=== Similar species ===
it is morphologically similar to C. nuda (wood blewit).

It also resembles Clitocybe tarda, which may be the identity of alleged California specimens.

== Distribution and habitat ==
Collybia personata is found fruiting in open grasslands, parks, pastures, forest clearings, and in the vicinity of forest edges, unlike C. nuda which is commonly found in woodland. Collybia personata fruits gregariously, forming distinctive fairy rings. It is widespread in Europe, where its fruiting season extends from summer to the beginning of winter. In the United Kingdom, the season extends from September through to December.

== Edibility ==
Field blewits are edible.

Blewits can be eaten as a cream sauce or sautéed in butter; they can also be cooked like tripe or as an omelette filling.

Field blewits are often infested with fly larvae and do not store very well; they should therefore be used soon after picking. They are also very porous, so they are best picked on a dry day.
