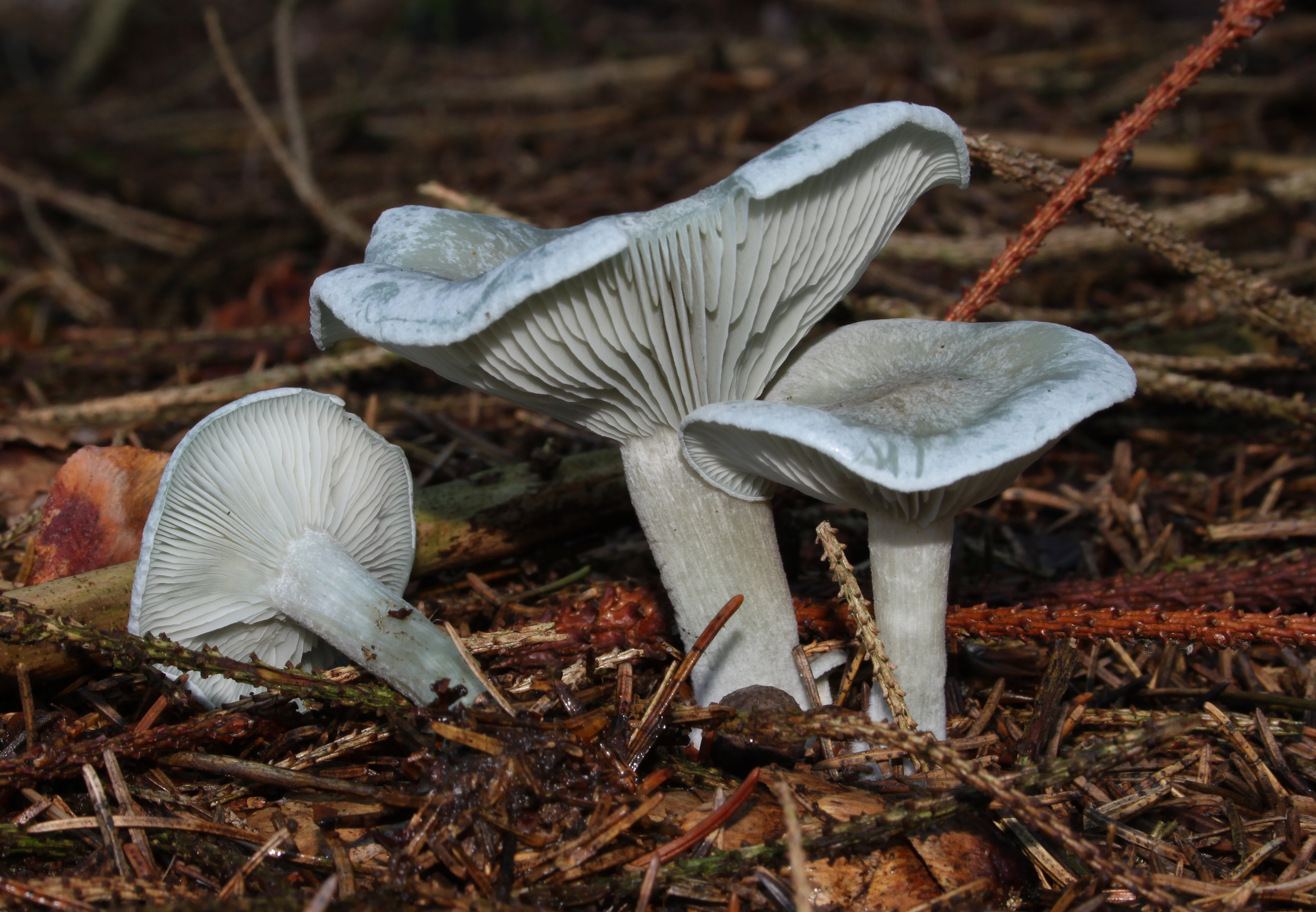

Scientific classification
- Domain: Eukaryota
- Kingdom: Fungi
- Division: Basidiomycota
- Class: Agaricomycetes
- Order: Agaricales
- Family: Clitocybaceae
- Genus: Clitocybe
- Species: C. odora

Binomial name
- Clitocybe odora (Bull.) P.Kumm. (1871)

Synonyms
- Agaricus viridis Hudson (1778); Agaricus odorus Bull. (1784); Clitocybe viridis (Hudson) Gillet (1874)

= Clitocybe odora =

Species of fungus

Clitocybe odora Mycological characteristics
- Gills on hymenium
- Cap is flat
- Hymenium is decurrent
- Stipe is bare
- Spore print is white
- Ecology is mycorrhizal
- Edibility is edible but not recommended

Clitocybe odora, commonly known as the blue green anise mushroom, or aniseed toadstool, is a blue-green mushroom that smells strongly like anise. It grows near deciduous and coniferous trees, in small groups alongside tree roots. This mushroom is edible but may resemble poisonous species.

== Taxonomy ==
First described by the French mycologist Jean Baptiste Francois Pierre Bulliard (1742–1793). The specific epithet odora is from the Latin meaning "perfumed".

== Description ==
Young specimens have a bell-shaped cap with a light blue texture that fades to grey in age. The cap measures 3–8 centimetres (1–3 in) wide. Mature specimens have blue-green, cup-shaped caps with a rough surface; the gills are adnate to decurrent and creamy white or blue-green. The spore print is whitish to slightly pink.

The stem is white to buff or cap-colored with no ring. It grows up to 6 cm (2 1/2 in) tall and 2 cm thick. The mushroom has a strong scent and taste of aniseed, hence its name. The odor is due to the presence of p-anisaldehyde and a small amount of benzaldehyde.

There is a white variety (Clitocybe odora var. alba Lange) that has the same strong odour.

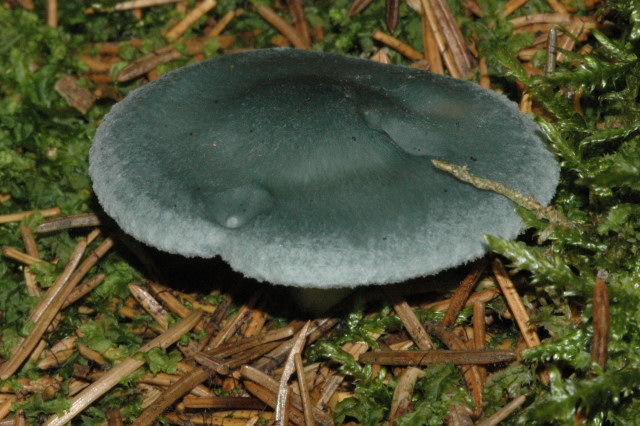
Young cap

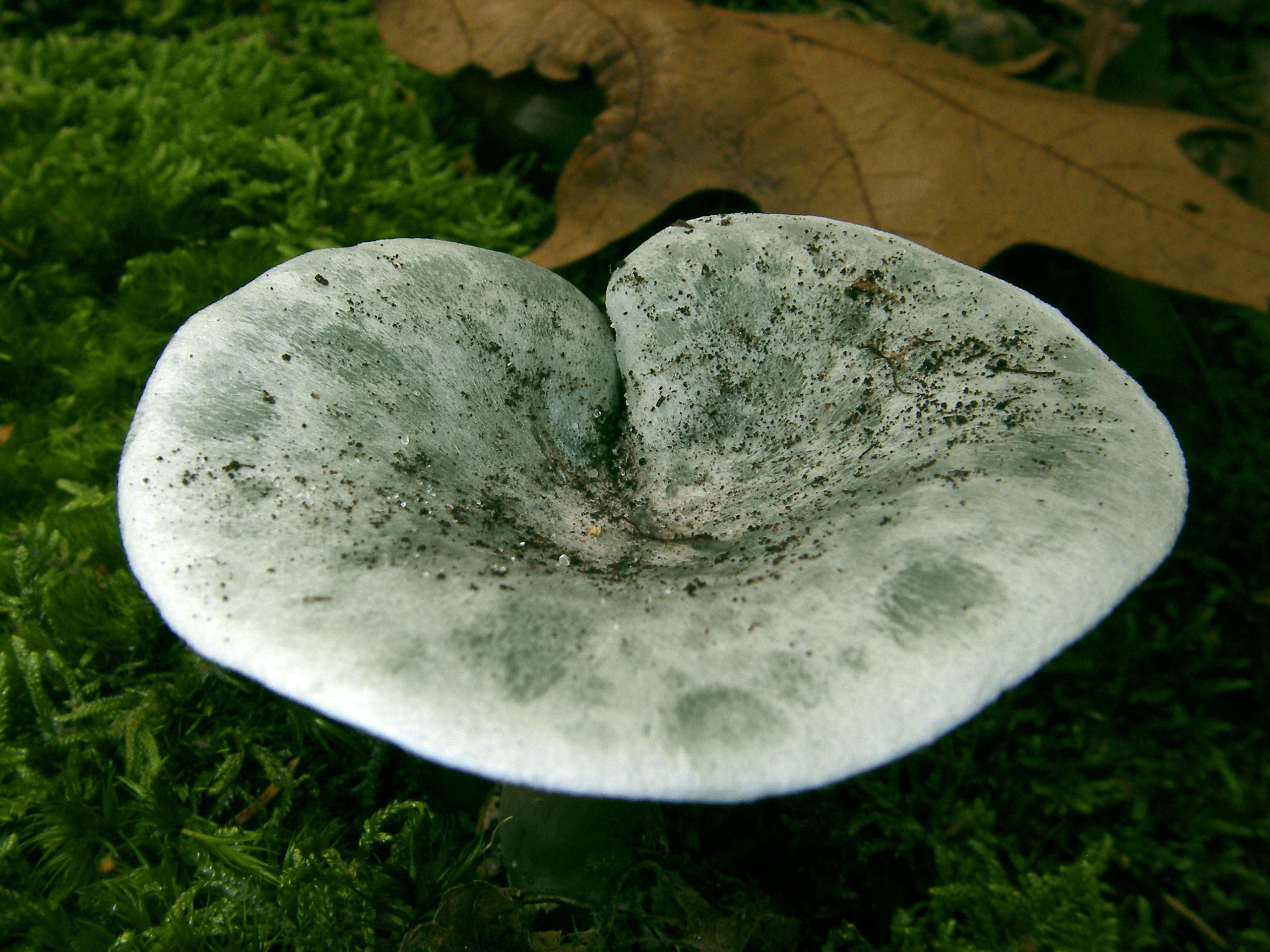
Faded cap

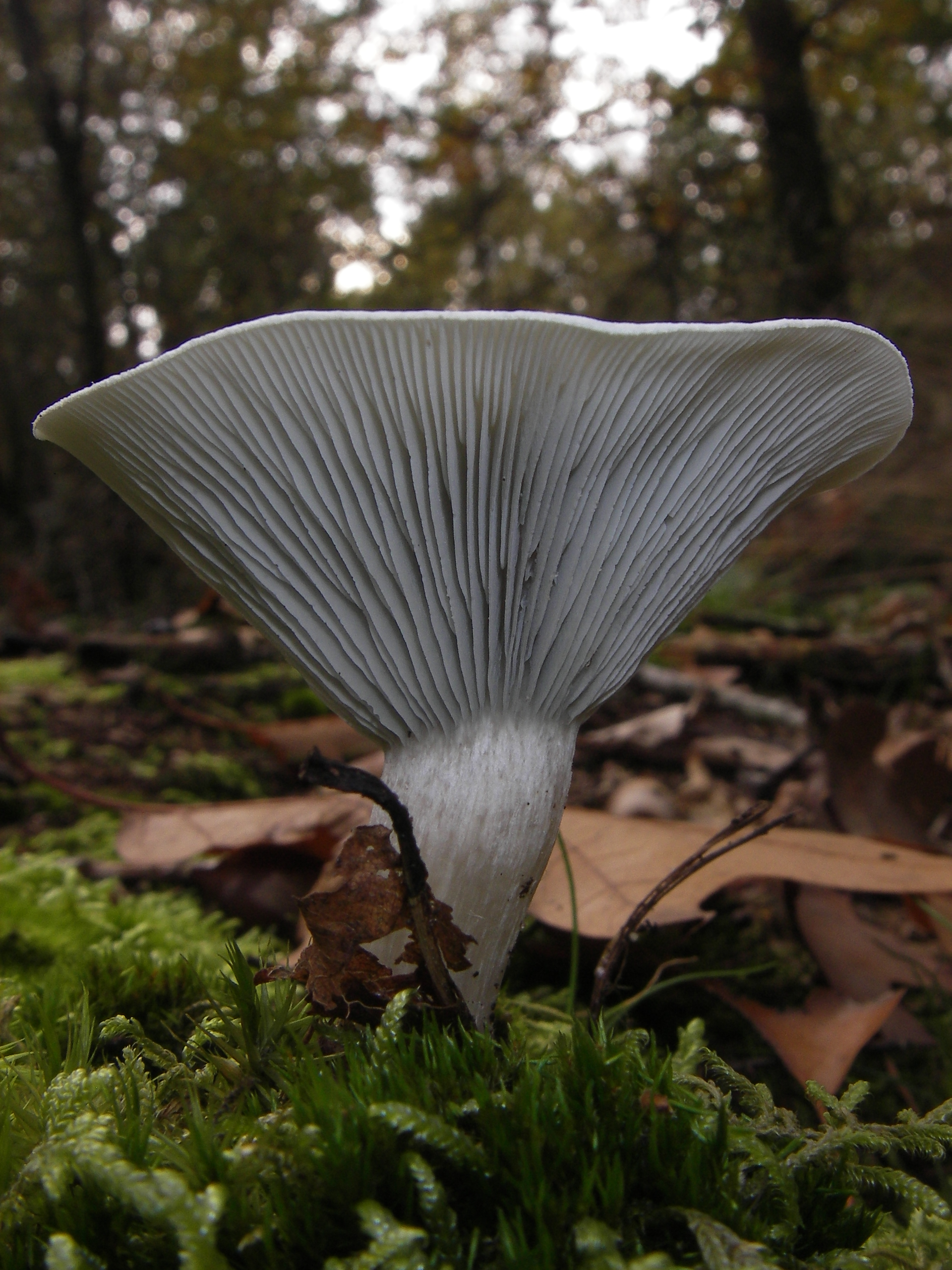
Gills and stipe

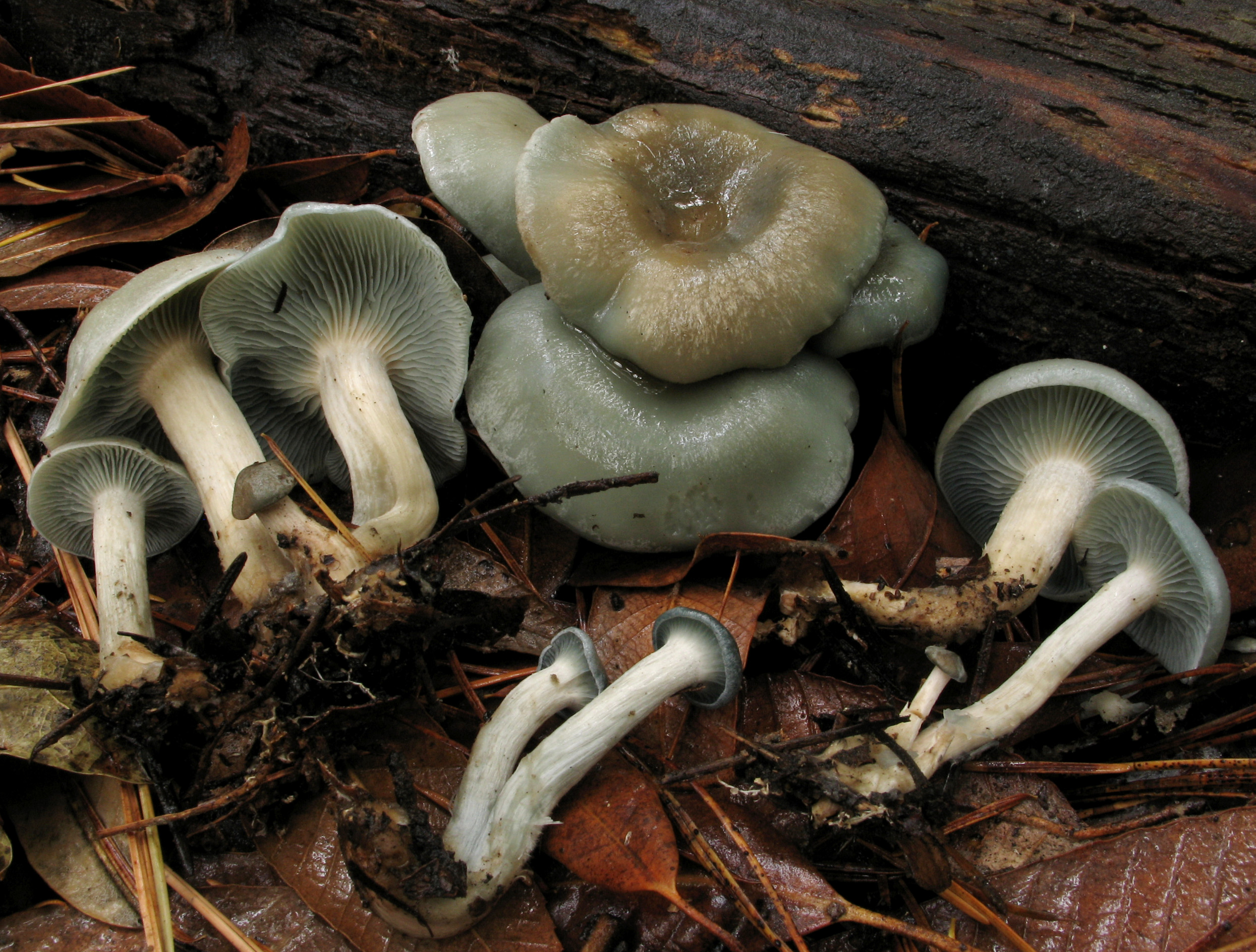
Group in habitat

=== Similar species ===
Outside of Clitocybe, young specimens could be confused with Stropharia aeruginosa, in addition to other poisonous species.

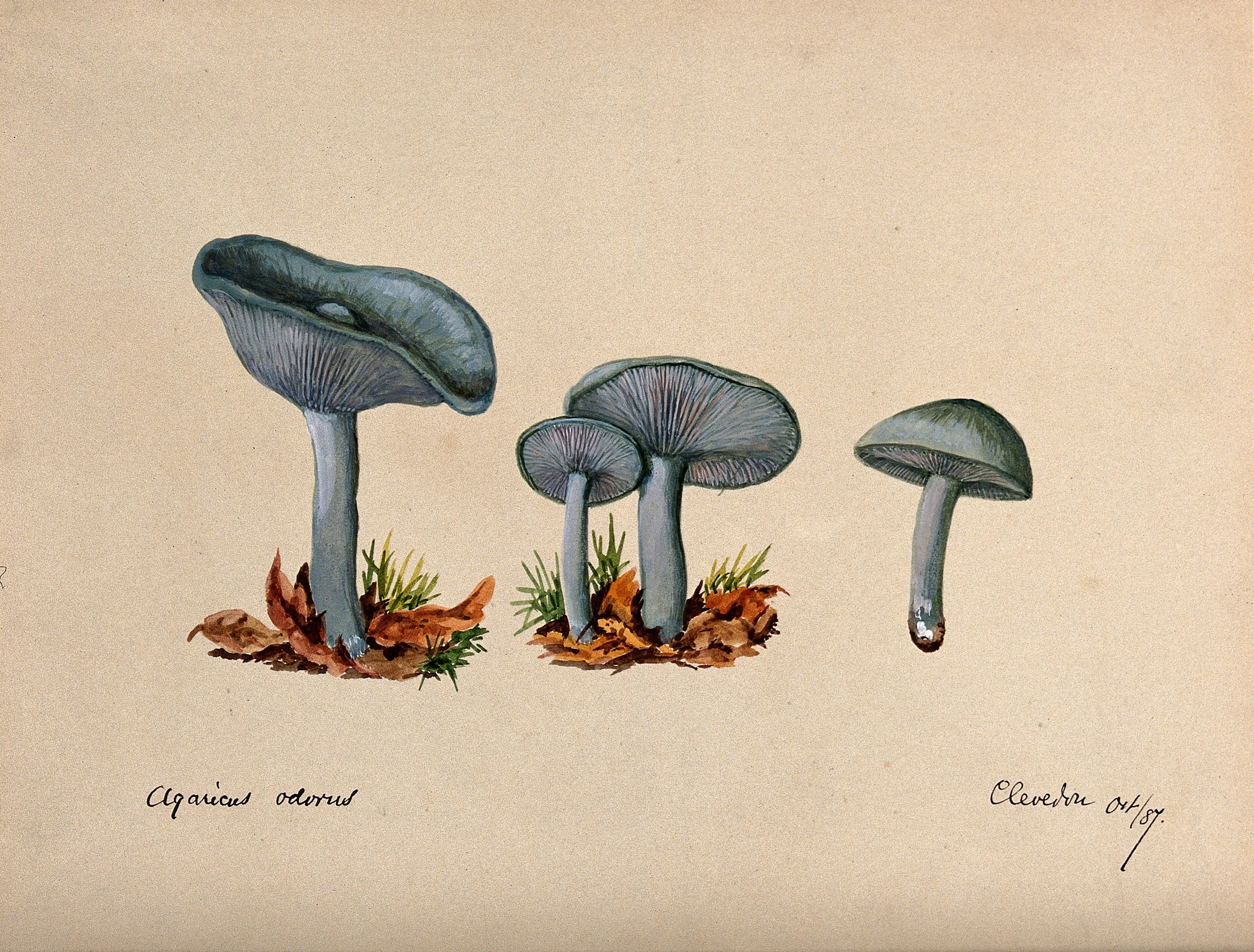
Four fruiting bodies. Watercolour, 1887. Iconographic Collections

== Distribution and habitat ==
Found in both deciduous, and coniferous woods, it is widespread in the temperate zones, occurring in Asia, Europe (August to December), and North America (around August to November). On the East Coast of North America it favours oak woodland, but it is often abundant in the coniferous forests of the Pacific Northwest. It grows under trees and in debris.

== Edibility ==
The caps can be dried and used as a condiment, or used fresh for flavouring. Mushroom hunters are advised to pick mature specimens, as the younger ones can be confused with several similar poisonous ones that grow with this mushroom. Every part of the mushroom should be examined before collecting for the table. Also, the stem and the cut cap should be checked to see if there are any fly larvae. Some guides recommend against eating the species.
