= Hesperentomidae =

Scientific classification
- Domain: Eukaryota
- Kingdom: Animalia
- Phylum: Arthropoda
- Order: Protura
- Family: Hesperentomidae; Price, 1960

Family of insect-like animals

The Hesperentomidae are a family of hexapods in the order Protura.

== Genera ==
- Hesperentomon Price, 1960
- Huhentomon Yin, 1977
- Ionescuellum Tuxen, 1960
