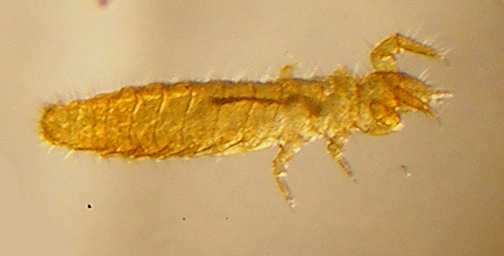
- Acerentomon sp. under stereo microscope

Scientific classification
- Kingdom: Animalia
- Phylum: Arthropoda
- Clade: Pancrustacea
- Clade: Allotriocarida
- Subphylum: Hexapoda
- Order: Protura; Silvestri, 1907

Families
- Acerentomata: Hesperentomidae; Protentomidae; Acerentomidae; Eosentomata: Antelientomidae; Eosentomidae; Sinentomata: Fujientomidae; Sinentomidae

= Protura =

Class of hexapods

The Protura, or proturans, and sometimes nicknamed coneheads, are very small (0.6–1.5 mm long), soil-dwelling animals, so inconspicuous they were not noticed until the 20th century. The Protura constitute a class of hexapods that were previously regarded as insects.

Some evidence indicates the Protura are basal to all other hexapods, although not all researchers consider them Hexapoda, rendering the monophyly of Hexapoda unsettled. Uniquely among hexapods, proturans show anamorphic development, whereby body segments are added posteriorly.

There are close to 800 species, described in seven families. Nearly 300 species are contained in a single genus, Eosentomon.

== Morphology ==
Proturans have no compound eyes, wings, or antennae, and, lacking pigmentation, are usually whitish or pale brown. The sensory function of the absent antennae is fulfilled by the first pair of the three pairs of five-segmented legs, which are held up, pointing forward, and bearing numerous tarsal sensilla and sensory hairs. They ambulate using the four rear legs. The head is conical, and bears two pseudoculi with unknown function. The body is elongated and cylindrical, with a post-anal telson at the end. The mouthparts are entognathous (enclosed within the head capsule) and consist of narrow mandibles and maxillae. There are no cerci at the end of the abdomen, which gives the group their name, from the Greek proto- (meaning "first", in this case implying primitive), and ura, meaning "tail". The first three abdominal segments bear short limb-like appendages, called "styli". The first pair of styli is two-segmented, while the second and third pair are either two-segmented or unsegmented. The genitalia are internal and the genital opening lies between the eleventh segment and the telson of the adult. During mating, the genitalia of both sexes are everted from an abdominal chamber. Only the two families Eosentomidae and Sinentomidae possess a simple tracheal system with a pair of spiracles on both the mesothorax and the metathorax, while proturans in the remaining families lack these structures and perform gas exchange by diffusion.

== Ecology ==
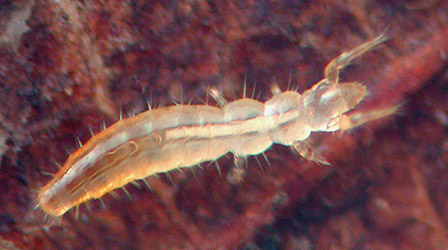
Proturan found in Durham, United States

Proturans live chiefly in soil, mosses, and leaf litter of moist temperate forests that are not too acidic. They have also been found beneath rocks or under the bark of trees, as well as in animal burrows. They are generally restricted to the uppermost 0.1 m (3.9 in), but have been found as deep as 0.25 m (9.8 in). Although they are sometimes regarded as uncommon, proturans are most likely overlooked because of their small size, as densities of over 90,000 individuals per square metre have been recorded.

The diet of proturans has not yet been sufficiently observed to be characterised. In laboratory culture, they may be fed mycorrhizal fungi, dead mites and pulverized, dried mushrooms; they are believed to feed on decaying vegetable matter and fungi in the wild. The styliform mouthparts suggest the Protura may be fluid feeders, based on evidence that some species suck out the liquid contents of fungal hyphae.

Proturan species which spend their lives near the soil surface generally produce one new generation of offspring each year; they also possess longer legs. Species living at deeper soil levels have shorter legs and tend to reproduce less seasonally. Some migratory proturan species move to deeper soil layers for the winter and ascend to shallower soil layers for the summer.

Proturans play a role in soil formation and composition by speeding decomposition, helping in the breakdown of leaf litter and recycling nutrients into the soil.

== Development ==
The nymph has 8 abdominal segments plus the telson; the number of abdominal segments increases through moulting until the full adult complement of 12 abdominal segments is achieved. Further moults may occur, but do not add additional body segments; it is still not known whether the adults continue to moult throughout their lives. Eggs have been observed in only a few species.

In most proturan families, five developmental stages follow the egg stage: the prenymph hatches from the egg and has only weakly developed mouthparts and 8 abdominal segments; nymph I follows and has fully developed mouthparts; nymph II has 9 abdominal segments; "maturus junior" has 11 abdominal segments, and moults into the sexually mature adult. Male individuals of the family Acerentomidae differ from this five-stage scheme, having an additional developmental stage, the preimago, which has partially developed genitalia and appears between the "maturus junior" and the adult stage.

== History ==
Proturans were first discovered in the early 20th century, when Filippo Silvestri and Antonio Berlese independently described the animals. The first species to be described was Acerentomon doderoi, published in 1907 by Silvestri, based on material found near Syracuse, New York.
