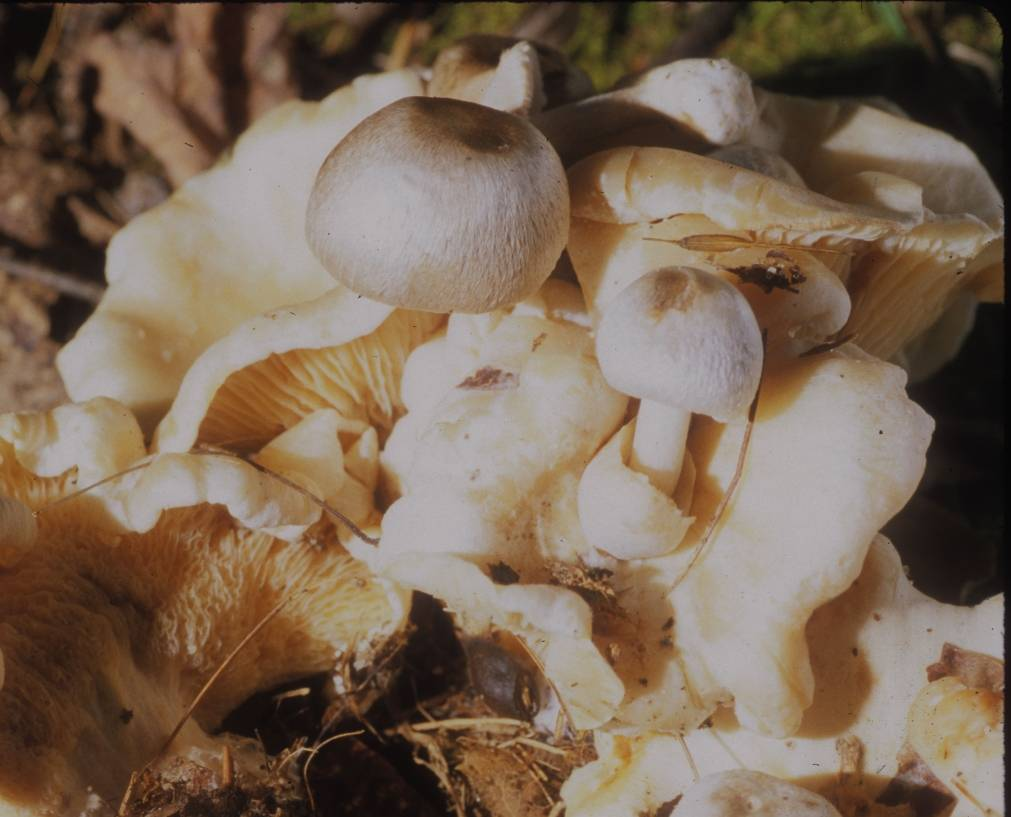

Scientific classification
- Kingdom: Fungi
- Division: Basidiomycota
- Class: Agaricomycetes
- Order: Agaricales
- Family: Pluteaceae
- Genus: Volvariella
- Species: V. surrecta

Binomial name
- Volvariella surrecta (Knapp) Singer (1951)

Synonyms
- Agaricus surrectus Knapp (1829); Agaricus loveianus Berk. (1836); Volvariopsis loweiana (Berk.) Murrill (1917); Volvaria hypopithys subsp. loveiana (Berk.) Konrad & Maubl. (1924); Volvaria surrecta (Knapp) Ramsb. (1942)

= Volvariella surrecta =

Species of fungus

Volvariella surrecta
- Mycological characteristics
- Gills on hymenium
- Cap is convex or flat
- Hymenium is free
- Stipe has a volva
- Spore print is pinkish-brown
- Ecology is parasitic
- Edibility is inedible

Volvariella surrecta, commonly known as the piggyback rosegill, is an agaric fungus in the family Pluteaceae. V. surrecta mushrooms have white or greyish silky-hairy caps up to 8 cm (3.1 in) in diameter, and white gills that turns pink in maturity. The stipe, also white, is up to 9 cm (3.5 in) long, and has a sack-like volva at its base.

Although rare, the species is widely distributed, having been reported from Eurasia, northern Africa, North America, and New Zealand. The fungus grows as a parasite on the fruit bodies of other gilled mushrooms, usually Clitocybe nebularis.

== Taxonomy ==
The species was first mentioned in scientific literature as Agaricus surrectus by English botanist John Leonard Knapp in his 1829 Journal of a Naturalist. Knapp described the species and illustrated it in a woodcut. He wrote:

We have even an agaric, with a bulbous root and downy pileus, that will spring from the smooth summit of another (agaricus caseus), which has a uniform footstalk, though not of common occurrence. Thus a plant, that itself arises from decay, is found to constitute a soil for another; and the termination of this chain of efficiency is hidden from us.

Seven years later, Miles Berkeley described the fungus as Agaricus loveianus, not aware of Knapp's previous publication, and wrote that it was "a most elegant and curious species which ... appears not to have been hitherto noticed". Berkeley's name was frequently used in literature to refer to the fungus for over a century rather than Knapp. In his 1917 North American Flora, William Alphonso Murrill proposed a new name combination for the species based on Berkeley's name, Volvariopsis loweiana. In 1942, John Ramsbottom discovered Knapp's image and description of the fungus, and realizing it referred to the same species as Berkeley's Agaricus loveianus, made the new combination Volvaria surrecta. Rolf Singer transferred it to the genus Volvariella in 1951, giving it the name by which it is known presently.

Molecular analysis of DNA sequences suggests that V. surrecta belongs to the Volvariella pusilla group—a grouping of related Volvariella species that produce small, white fruit bodies. In this analysis, V. surrecta formed a subclade with V. hypopithys. Almost 90 years earlier, Paul Konrad and André Maublanc recognized the relatedness of these species, and proposed that V. surrecta should be considered a subspecies of V. hypopithys.

The specific epithet surrecta is Latin for "to arise". Berkeley's epithet loveianus honors British naturalist and Reverend Richard Thomas Lowe. The mushroom is commonly known as the piggyback rosegill.

== Description ==
The fruit bodies of V. surrecta have caps that are initially ovoid (egg-shaped. Later they become bell-shaped or convex before flattening; reaching diameters of 2.5–8 cm (1.0–3.1 in). The cap sometimes has a shallow umbo, although the presence of this character is not consistent. The cap surface is dry and covered with long, silky hairs; the color is white to light gray, with a yellowish or brownish center. The gills are free from attachment to the stipe and are packed close together. They are initially white, later becoming pink. There are many lamellulae (short gills that do not extend fully from cap margin to the stipe) interspersed between the gills. The stipe is 4–9 cm (1.6–3.5 in) long by 4–12 mm (0.16–0.47 in) thick, and roughly equal in width throughout the length or somewhat thicker at the base. Its color is white to light gray, and the stipe surface is appressed-fibrillose, with a pruinose coating near the apex. The white volva measures 1.3–2.5 cm (0.5–1.0 in) high and 0.6–1.3 cm (0.2–0.5 in) broad, and has a lobed margin. The mushroom is not edible.

The color of the spore print is brownish-pink. The spores are egg-shaped to oval, measuring 5.4–7.6 by 3.4–4.9 μm. The basidia (spore-bearing cells) are club-shaped, four-spored, and measure 20–31 by 5–10 μm. The pleurocystidia (cystidia on the gill face) are fusoid-ventricose (distinctly enlarged in the middle and tapered toward both ends), sometimes with an elongated neck. The cheilocystidia (cystidia on the gill edge) are also fusoid-ventricose with a neck that is sometimes short and bulbous; they measure 25–50 by 6–20 μm. The hyphae do not have clamp connections.

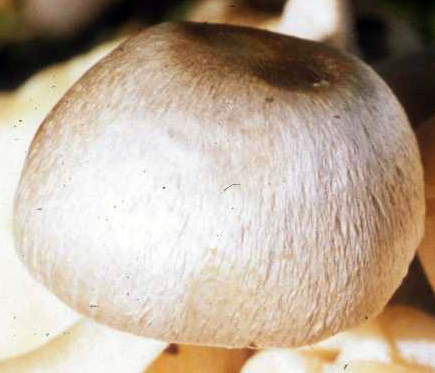
The cap has a silky surface and a darker center.

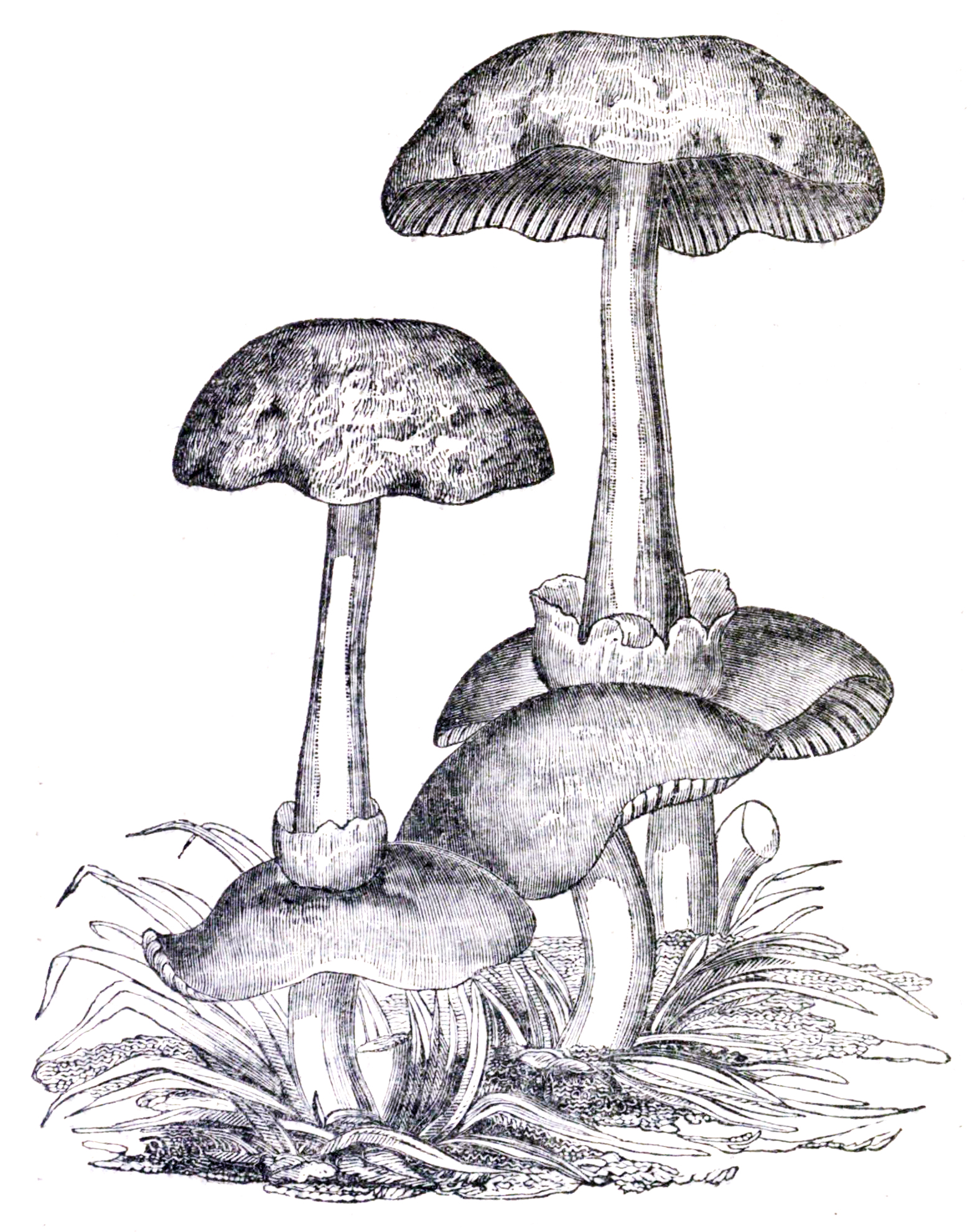
1829 illustration by J. L. Knapp

=== Similar species ===
Because of its occurrence on the fruit bodies of other agarics, V. surrecta is unlikely to be confused with other mushrooms. Other parasitic mushrooms include Asterophora species, but these have thick gills compared to the thin gills of V. surrecta. Collybia species, including C. cookei, C. cirrhata and C. tuberosa are saprobic, and grow on the blackened, decayed remains of other agarics. Their fruit bodies are much smaller than V. surrecta, with cap diameters up to 2 cm (0.8 in). Although some other Volvariella species have an appearance similar to V. surrecta, they grow in grass or in leaf litter.

== Habitat and distribution ==
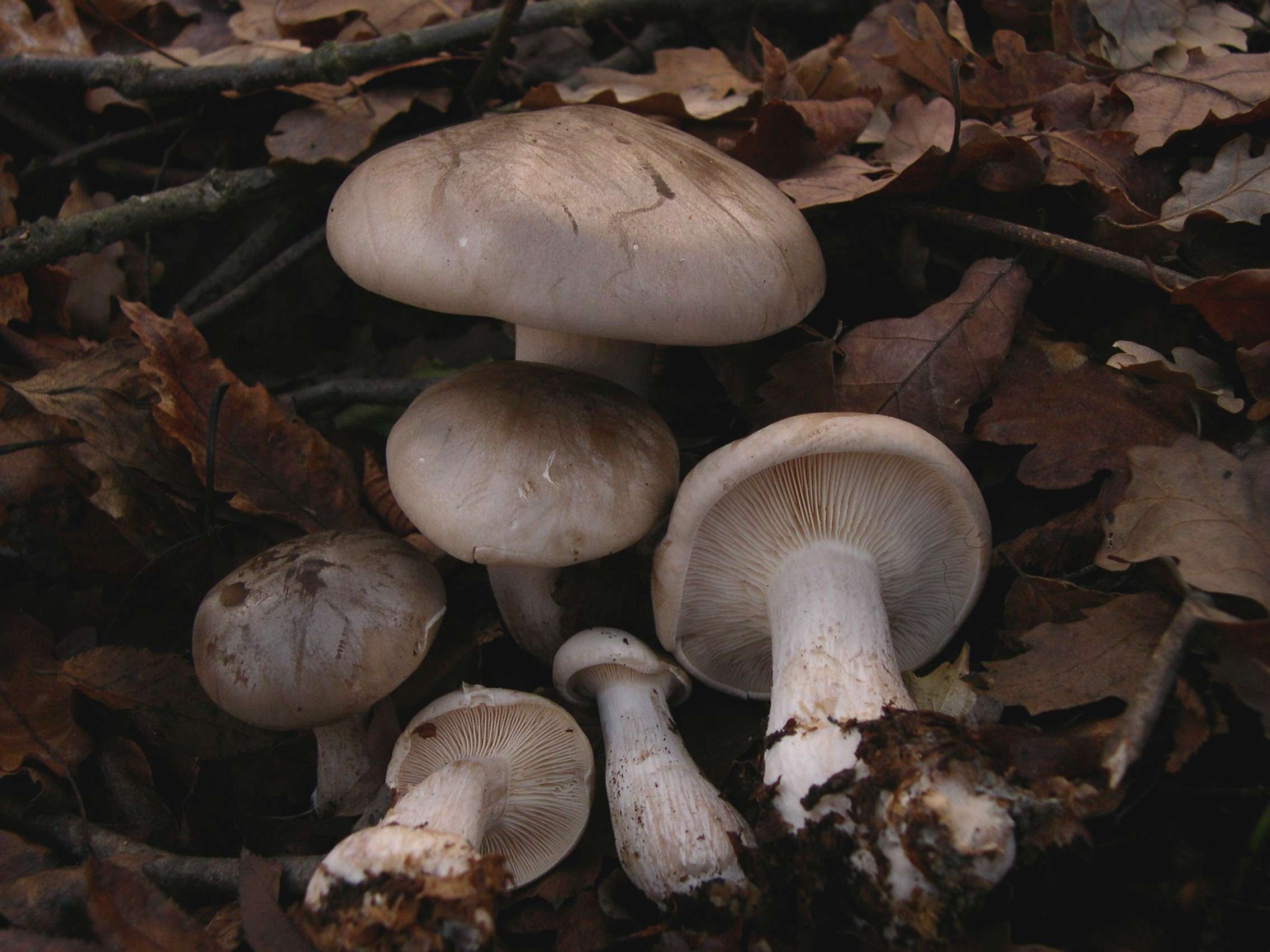
Clitocybe nebularis is a common host for V. surrecta.

Volvariella surrecta grows parasitically on the fruit bodies of Clitocybe species, usually C. nebularis, although it has been reported growing on Tricholoma species, as well as Melanoleuca brevipes. The mushrooms grow in clusters, and fruit in the summer and autumn. The host mushroom is sometimes malformed and assumes an irregular appearance. In an early publication, Charles Bagge Plowright commented "Berkeley's figure ... is rather misleading. So is that given by Knapp under the name Agaricus surrectus ..., inasmuchas they show the Agaric (A. nebularis), upon which it is parasitic, in a very robust condition. In my specimen the host (A. nebularis) was quite sodden and collapsed so as to be practically unrecognisable unless one had known what species to expect."

Volvariella surrecta is a rare species, even though its major host is quite common; the conditions required for the parasite to produce fruit bodies are not well known. Some authors have suggested that it may grow equally well as a parasite or a saprobe. V. surrecta has been found on its host in several different habitat types, including birch woodlands, pine plantations, scrub, thickets of small trees or shrubs beside roads, and under brambles. No definite preference for soil type has been determined, having been found in sands, clay, gravels, and peat. In 1867, Worthington George Smith reported that he had successfully cultivated the species by partially burying fruit bodies under water-soaked rotting fir leaves that were placed in a bell-glass in a warm room. According to his account, a white mycelium grew over the leaves and eventually formed small white pins (immature, undifferentiated fruit bodies) that grew into fully formed mushrooms about two weeks after starting.

The geographical distribution of the fungus includes North America north of Mexico, northern Africa, Europe, New Zealand, and Asia (Amur region of Russia, India, and Korea).
