= Ramsbottom (surname) =

Surname

Ramsbottom is an English surname. Notable people with the surname include:

- Alan Ramsbottom (1936–2023), British racing cyclist
- Alfred Ramsbottom (1831–1893), American soldier who fought in the American Civil War
- Caleb Ramsbottom (1769–1827), English lightweight boxer
- Greg Ramsbottom (fl. c. 1995–c. 2007), Irish football player
- Henry Ramsbottom (1846–1905), English cricketer
- James Ramsbottom, birth name of Charles Melville (1828–1867), Union Navy sailor in the American Civil War, recipient of the Medal of Honor
- James Kirkham Ramsbottom (1891–1925), English botanist
- John Ramsbottom (engineer) (1814–1897), English mechanical engineer
- John Ramsbottom (MP) (1778–1845), British Whig politician and landowner
- John Ramsbottom (mycologist) (1885–1974), British mycologist
- Neil Ramsbottom (born 1945), English football player
- Neville Ramsbottom-Isherwood (1905–1950), New Zealand born Royal Air Force test pilot and commanding officer
- Richard Ramsbottom (1749–1813), British Tory politician
- Sue Ramsbottom (born 1973), Irish sportswoman

== Fictional ==
- Albert Ramsbottom and his parents feature in several monologues performed by Stanley Holloway
- Silas Ramsbottom, supporting character in the Despicable Me franchise
- Wendolene Ramsbottom, in A Close Shave, a 1995 Wallace and Gromit animated film
- Thursday Ramsbottom, a fictional Canadian ram in Marathon (2028)

== See also ==
- Ramsbottom, market town in the Metropolitan Borough of Bury, Greater Manchester, England
- Ramsbottomia, genus of fungi in the family Pyronemataceae
- Ramsbottom Carbon Residue, a method used in the petroleum industry to calculate the carbon residue of a fuel
- Ramsbottom Valve, a safety valve used in a thermal-hydraulics plant
- Reamsbottom

Media related to Ramsbottom (surname) at Wikimedia Commons
