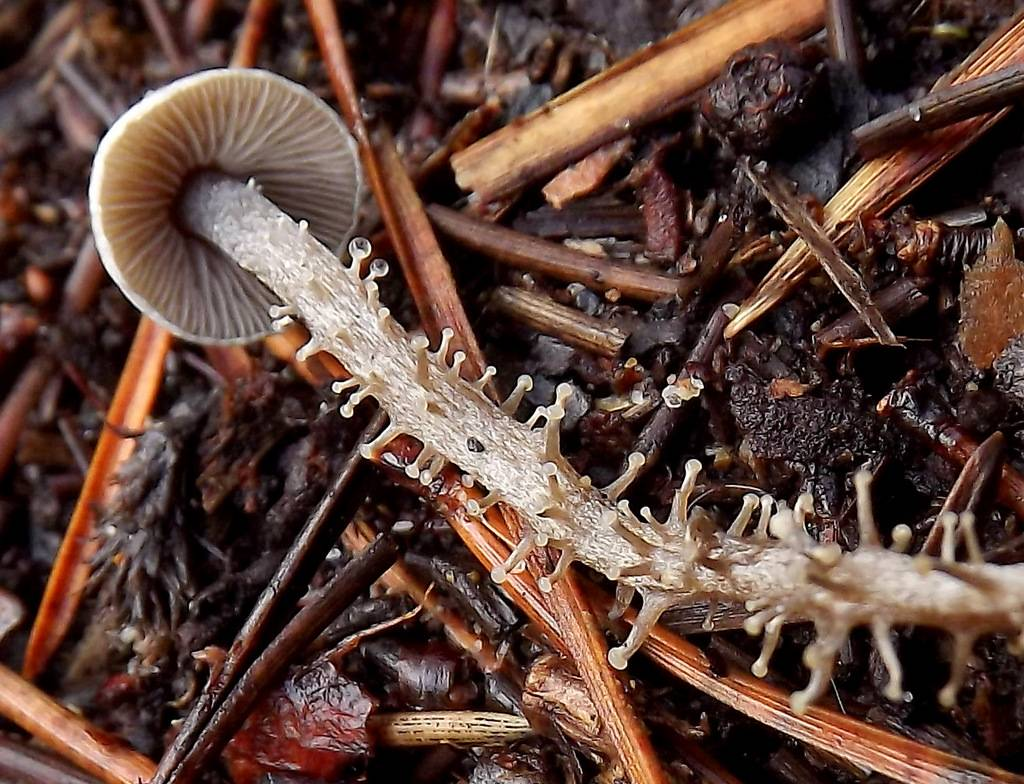

Conservation status
- Apparently Secure (NatureServe)

Scientific classification
- Kingdom: Fungi
- Division: Basidiomycota
- Class: Agaricomycetes
- Order: Agaricales
- Family: Tricholomataceae
- Genus: Dendrocollybia; R.H.Petersen & Redhead (2001)
- Species: D. racemosa

Binomial name
- Dendrocollybia racemosa (Pers.) R.H.Petersen & Redhead (2001)

Synonyms
- Agaricus racemosus Pers.; Collybia racemosa (Pers.) Quél.; Microcollybia racemosa (Pers.) Lennox; Mycena racemosa (Pers.) Gray

= Dendrocollybia =

Genus of fungi in the family Tricholomataceae

Dendrocollybia is a fungal genus in the family Tricholomataceae of the order Agaricales. It is a monotypic genus, containing the single species Dendrocollybia racemosa, commonly known as the branched collybia or the branched shanklet.

Dendrocollybia racemosa fruit bodies have small pale grayish-white or grayish-brown caps up to 1 cm (0.4 in) wide, and thin stems up to 6 cm (2.4 in) long. The species is characterized by its unusual stem, which is covered with short lateral branches. The branches often produce spherical slimeheads of translucent conidiophores on their swollen tips. The conidiophores produce conidia (asexual spores) by mitosis. Because the fungus can rely on either sexual or asexual modes of reproduction, fruit bodies sometimes have reduced or even missing caps. The unusual stems originate from black pea-sized structures called sclerotia. The anamorphic form of the fungus, known as Tilachlidiopsis racemosa, is missing the sexual stage of its life cycle. It can reproduce at relatively low temperatures, an adaptation believed to improve its ability to grow quickly and fruit on decomposing mushrooms.

The somewhat rare species usually grows on the decaying fruit bodies of other agarics—such as Lactarius and Russula—although the host mushrooms may be decayed to the point of being difficult to recognize. It is found in the Northern Hemisphere, including the Pacific Northwest region of western North America, and Europe, where it is included in several Regional Red Lists.

== Taxonomy ==
- - - - - Collybia tuberosa
        - Collybia cookei
      - Collybia cirrhata
    - Clitocybe dealbata
  - - - Dendrocollybia racemosa
      - Clitocybe connata
    - Hypsizygus ulmarius
    - Lepista nuda

Phylogeny and relationships of D. racemosa and closely related fungi based on ribosomal DNA sequences

Dendrocollybia
- Mycological characteristics
- Gills on hymenium
- Cap is conical or convex
- Hymenium is adnexed
- Spore print is white
- Ecology is saprotrophic
- Edibility is unknown

The genus Dendrocollybia was first described in 2001, to accommodate the species previously known as Collybia racemosa. Before then, the so-named taxon was considered to be one of four species of Collybia, a genus which had itself has been redefined and reduced in 1997, when most of its species were transferred to Gymnopus and Rhodocollybia. C. racemosa was originally described and named Agaricus racemosus by Christian Hendrik Persoon in 1797, and sanctioned under that name by Elias Magnus Fries in 1821. In his Systema Mycologicum, Fries classified it in his "tribe" Collybia along with all other similar small, white-spored species with a convex cap and a fragile stem. In 1873 Lucien Quélet raised Fries' tribe Collybia to generic rank. Samuel Frederick Gray called the species Mycena racemosa in his 1821 Natural Arrangement of British Plants; both this name and Joanne Lennox's 1979 Microcollybia racemosa are considered synonyms.

Rolf Singer's fourth edition (1986) of his comprehensive Agaricales in Modern Taxonomy included Collybia racemosa in section Collybia, in addition to the three species that currently comprise the genus Collybia: C. tuberosa, C. cirrhata and C. cookei. A phylogenetic analysis of the internal transcribed spacer sequences of ribosomal DNA by Karen Hughes and colleagues showed that C. tuberosa, C. cirrhata and C. cookei form a monophyletic group within a larger Lyophyllum–Tricholoma–Collybia clade that includes several species of Lyophyllum, Tricholoma, Lepista, Hypsizygus and the species C. racemosa. Hughes and colleagues could not identify a clade that included all four species of Collybia. Restriction fragment length polymorphism analysis of the ribosomal DNA from the four species corroborated the results obtained from phylogenetic analysis. Based on these results, as well as differences in characteristics such as the presence of unique stem projections, fruit body pigmentation, and macrochemical reactions, they circumscribed the new genus Dendrocollybia to contain C. racemosa.

The fungus is commonly known as the branched Collybia, or the branched shanklet; Samuel Gray referred to it as the "racemelike high-stool". The specific epithet racemosa is from the Latin word racemus—"a cluster of grapes".

== Description ==
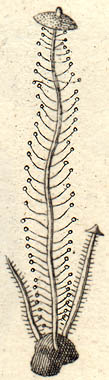
From Esenbeck's Das System der Pilze und Schwämme (1816)

The cap of Dendrocollybia racemosa is typically between 3 and 10 mm (0.1 and 0.4 in) in diameter, and depending on its stage of development, may be conic to convex, or in maturity, somewhat flattened with a slightly rounded central elevation (an umbo). The cap surface is dry and opaque, with a silky texture; its color in the center is fuscous (a dusky brownish-gray color), but the color fades uniformly towards the margin. The margin is usually curved toward the gills initially; as the fruit body matures the edge may roll out somewhat, but it also tends to fray or split with age. There may be shallow grooves on the cap that corresponds to the position of the gills underneath, which may give the cap edge a crenate (scalloped) appearance. The flesh is very thin (less than 1 mm thick) and fragile, lacking in color, and has no distinctive odor or taste. The gills are relatively broad, narrowly attached to the stem (adnexed), spaced closely together, and colored gray to grayish-tan, somewhat darker than the cap. There are additional gills, called lamellulae, that do not extend all the way to the stem; they are interspersed between the gills and arranged in up to three series (tiers) of equal length. Occasionally, the fungus produces stems with aborted caps, or with the caps missing entirely.

Stem resembles the raceme of the currant-bush, from whence the berries have been plucked; branches terminated by hyaline beads which disappear.

— S.F. Gray,

The stem is 4 to 6 cm (1.6 to 2.4 in) long by 1 mm thick, roughly equal in width throughout, and tapers to a long "root" which terminates in a dull black, roughly spherical sclerotium. The stem may be buried deeply in its substrate. The stem surface is roughly the same color as the cap, with a fine whitish powder on the upper surface. In the lower portion, the stem is brownish, and has fine grooves that run lengthwise up and down the surface. The lower half is covered with irregularly arranged short branch-like protuberances at right angles to the stem that measures 2–3 by 0.5 mm. These projections are cylindrical and tapering, with ends that are covered with a slime head of conidia (fungal spores produced asexually). D. racemosa is the only mushroom species known that form conidia on side branches of the stem. The sclerotium from which the stem arises is watery grayish and homogeneous in cross section (not divided into internal chambers), with a thin dull black outer coat, and measures 3 to 6 mm (0.12 to 0.24 in) in diameter. American mycologist Alexander H. Smith cautioned that novice collectors will typically miss the sclerotium the first time they find the species. The edibility of D. racemosa is unknown, but as David Arora says, the fruit bodies are "much too puny and rare to be of value".

=== Microscopic characteristics ===
The spores are narrowly ellipsoid to ovoid, thin-walled, hyaline (translucent), with dimensions of 4–5.5 by 2–3 μm. When stained with Melzer's reagent, the spores turn a light blue color. The basidia (the spore-bearing cells) are four-spored, measure 16–20 by 3.5–4 μm, and taper gradually towards the base. Cystidia are not differentiated in this species. The cap surface is made of a cuticle of radial, somewhat agglutinated, rather coarse hyphae that differ chiefly in size from the underlying tissue—initially 1–3 μm in diameter, becoming 5–7 μm wide in the underlying tissue. The hyphae are clamped, and encrusted with shallow irregularly shaped masses that are most conspicuous in the surface cells. The gill tissue is made of hyphae that project downward from the cap and arranged in a subparallel fashion, meaning that the hyphae are mostly parallel to one another and are slightly intertwined. The hyphae are clamped, with a narrow, branched compact subhymenium (a narrow zone of small, short hyphae immediately beneath the hymenium) composed of hyphae 2–3 μm in diameter. The conidia are 8.5–12 by 4–5 μm, peanut-shaped, non-amyloid (not changing color when stained with Melzer's reagent), clamped, and produced by fragmentation of the coarse mycelium. Clamp connections are present in the hyphae. Asexual spores are 10.0–15.5 by 3–4 μm, ellipsoid to oblong, non-amyloid, and contain granular contents. The grayish color of the fruit bodies is caused by encrusted pigments (crystalline aggregates of pigment molecules, possibly melanin) that occur throughout the tissue of the stem and cap, including the gills; these pigments are absent in Collybia species.

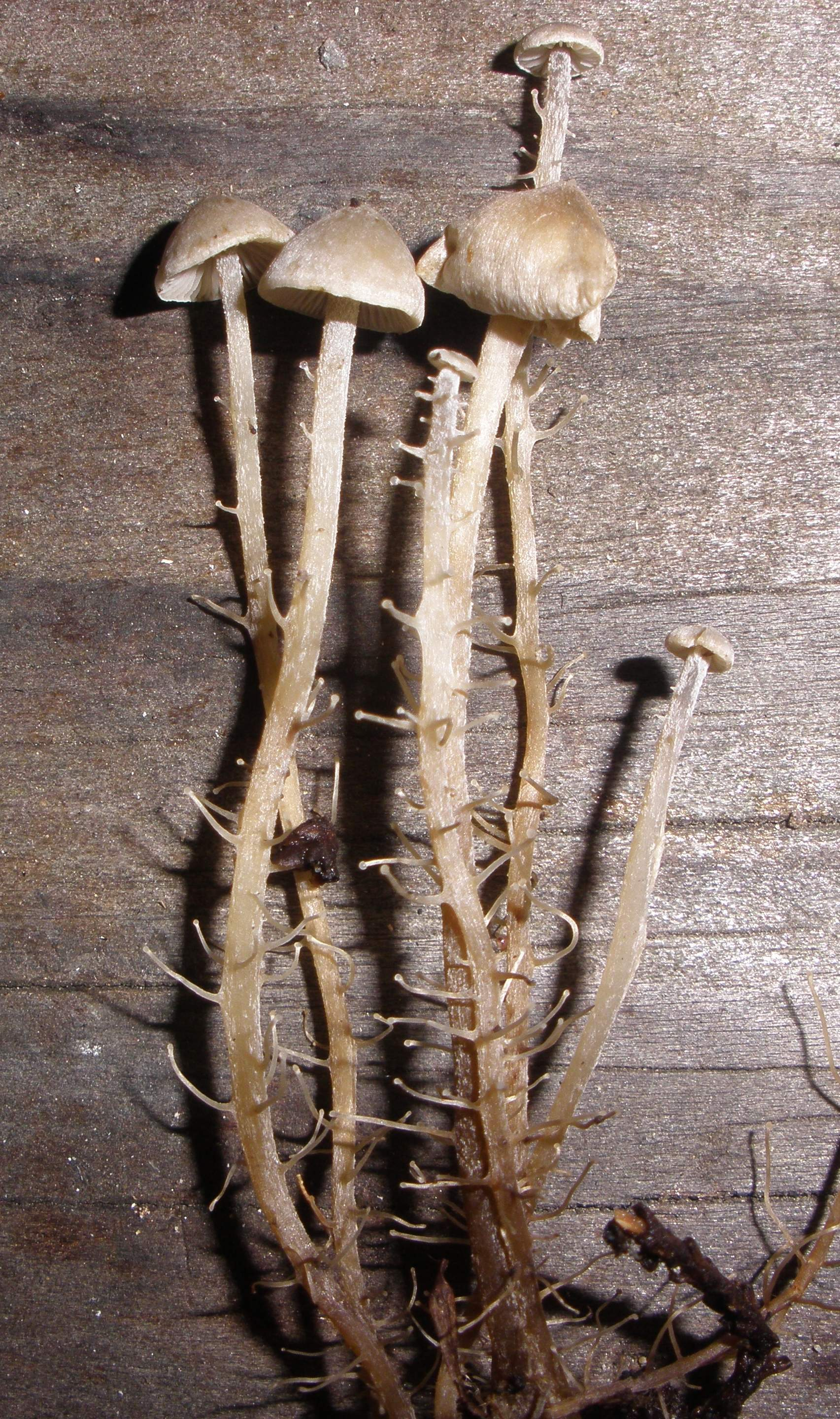
The lateral projections of the stem form conidia.

=== Anamorph form ===
The anamorphic or imperfect fungi are those that seem to lack a sexual stage in their life cycle, and typically reproduce by the process of mitosis in conidia. In some cases, the sexual stage—or teleomorph stage—is later identified, and a teleomorph-anamorph relationship is established between the species. The International Code of Botanical Nomenclature permits the recognition of two (or more) names for one and the same organism, one based on the teleomorph, the other(s) restricted to the anamorph. Tilachlidiopsis racemosa (formerly known as Sclerostilbum septentrionale, described by Alfred Povah in 1932) was shown to be the anamorphic form of Dendrocollybia racemosa. The synnemata (reproductive structures made of compact groups of erect conidiophores) produced by T. racemosa always grow on the stem of Dendrocollybia racemosa. The anamorph has an unusually low optimum growth temperature, between 12 and 18 °C (54 and 64 °F), within a larger growth range of 3 and 22 °C (37 and 72 °F). It is thought this is an adaptation that allows the mycelium to grow quickly and enhance its chances of fruiting on agaric mushrooms, which are generally short-lived.

=== Similar species ===
In contrast to the three species of Collybia, D. racemosa shows negligible reactivity to common chemical tests used in mushroom identification, including aniline, alpha-napthol, guaiacol, sulfoformol, phenol, and phenol-aniline.

The cortex (outer tissue layer) of the sclerotium can be used as a diagnostic character to distinguish between D. racemosa and small white specimens of Collybia. The hyphae of the cortex of D. racemosa are "markedly angular", in comparison with C. cookei (rounded hyphae) and C. tuberosa (elongated hyphae). The cortical layer in D. racemosa has an arrangement that is known as textura epidermoidea—with the hyphae arranged like a jigsaw puzzle. Heavy deposits of dark reddish-brown pigment are evident throughout the cortical tissue in or on the walls and the tips of hyphae. The remaining Collybia species, C. cirrhata, does not form sclerotia.

== Habitat, distribution, and ecology ==
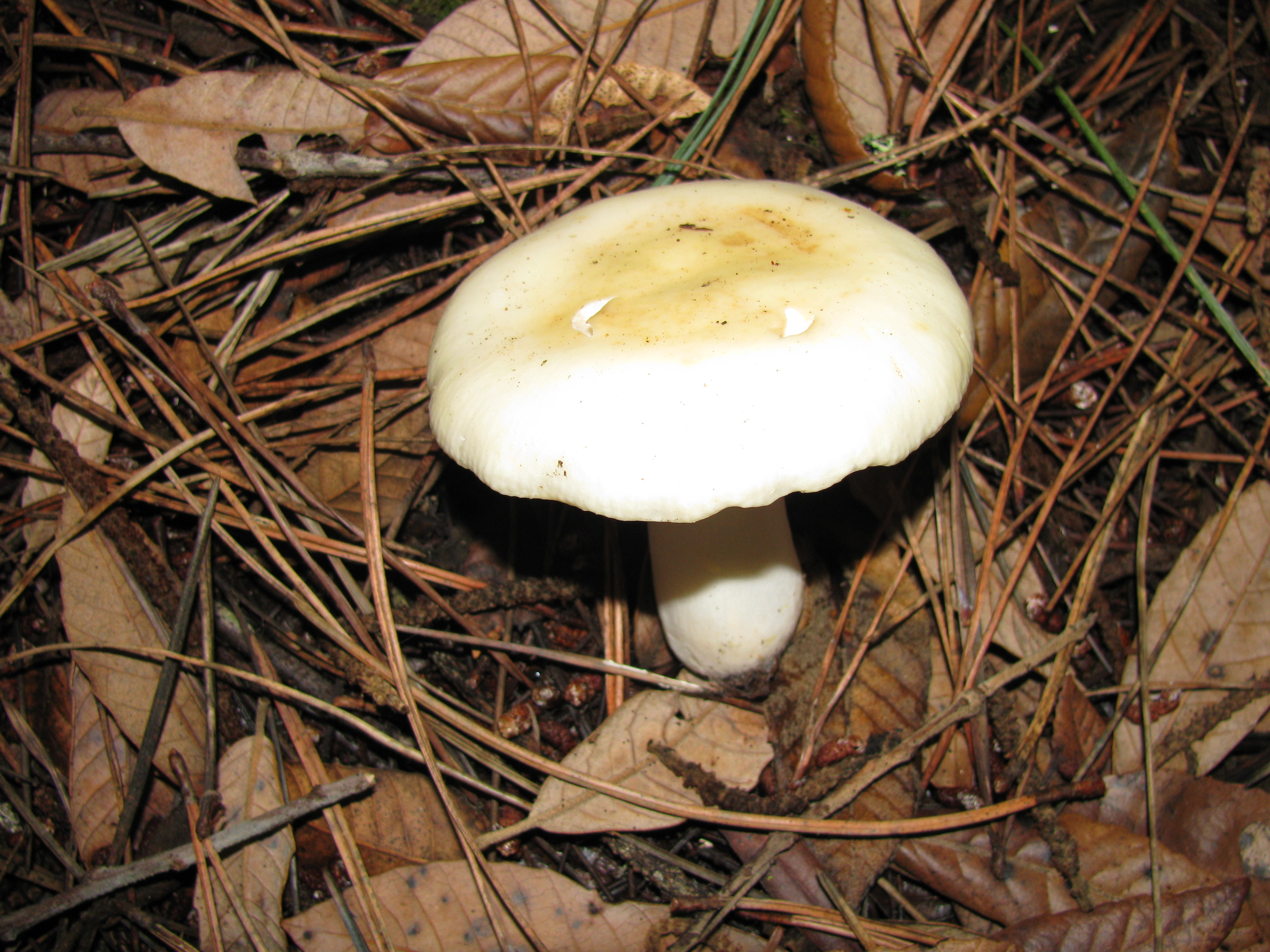
Russula crassotunicata has been verified as a host for Dendrocollybia.

Dendrocollybia racemosa is a saprobic species, meaning it derives nutrients by breaking down dead or dying tissue. Its fruit bodies grow on the well-decayed remains of agarics, often suspected to be Lactarius or Russula, although the hosts' identities are often unclear due to an advanced state of decay. A 2006 study used molecular analysis to confirm Russula crassotunicata as a host for D. racemosa. This Russula has a long and persistent decay period, and, in the Pacific Northwest region of the United States where the study was conducted, provides a "nearly year-round substrate for mycosaprobic species". Dendrocollybia is one of four agaric genera obligately associated with growth on the fruit bodies of other fungi, the others being Squamanita, Asterophora, and Collybia. Dendrocollybia is also found less commonly in deep coniferous duff, in groups or small clusters. The fungus can form sclerotia in the mummified host fruit bodies, and may also develop directly from their sclerotia in soil. The fungus is widely distributed in temperate regions of the Northern Hemisphere, but rarely collected "probably due to its small size, camouflage color, and tendency to be immersed in its substrate." In North America, where the distribution is restricted to the Pacific Northwest, fruit bodies are found in the late summer to autumn, often after a heavy fruiting period for other mushrooms is over. In Europe, it is known from the United Kingdom, Scandinavia, and Belgium. Dendrocollybia racemosa is in the Danish, Norwegian, and British Red Lists.

The saprobic behaviors of Collybia and Dendrocollybia are slightly different. In the autumn, fruit bodies of C. cirrhata, C. cookei and C. tuberosa, can be found on blackened, leathery, mummified fruit bodies of their hosts. Sometimes, these species appear to be growing in the soil (or from their sclerotium in soil or moss), but usually not in huge clusters. In these cases it is assumed that the hosts are remnants of fruit bodies from a previous season. In all observed cases of D. racemosa, however, the hosts have not been readily observed, suggesting that rapid digestion of the host (rather than mummification) may have taken place. Hughes and colleagues suggest that this may indicate the presence of a different enzymatic system, and a differing ability to compete with other fungi or bacteria.

== See also ==
- List of Tricholomataceae genera
