= C. cookei =

C. cookei may refer to:

- Cibicidoides cookei, a foraminiferan in the family Anomalinidae
- Collybia cookei, a species of fungus in the family Tricholomataceae, known from Europe, Asia, and North America
- Conus cookei, an extinct species of cone snail
- Crystallodytes cookei, the South Pacific sandburrower, a fish in the family Creediidae
