= Charles Melville =

Charles Melville may refer to:

- Charles Melville (Medal of Honor) (c. 1828–1867), Union Navy sailor and Medal of Honor recipient
- Charles Melville (cricketer) (1896–1954), Scottish cricketer and physician
- Charles P. Melville (born 1951), British professor of Persian history

== See also ==
- Charles Melvill (1878–1925), army officer in the British Army and the New Zealand Military Forces
