= Reamsbottom =

Reamsbottom is a surname. Notable people with the surname include:

- Barry Reamsbottom (born 1949), Scottish civil servant and trade union leader
- Sonia Reamsbottom (born 1962), Irish cricketer

== See also ==
- Ramsbottom (surname)
