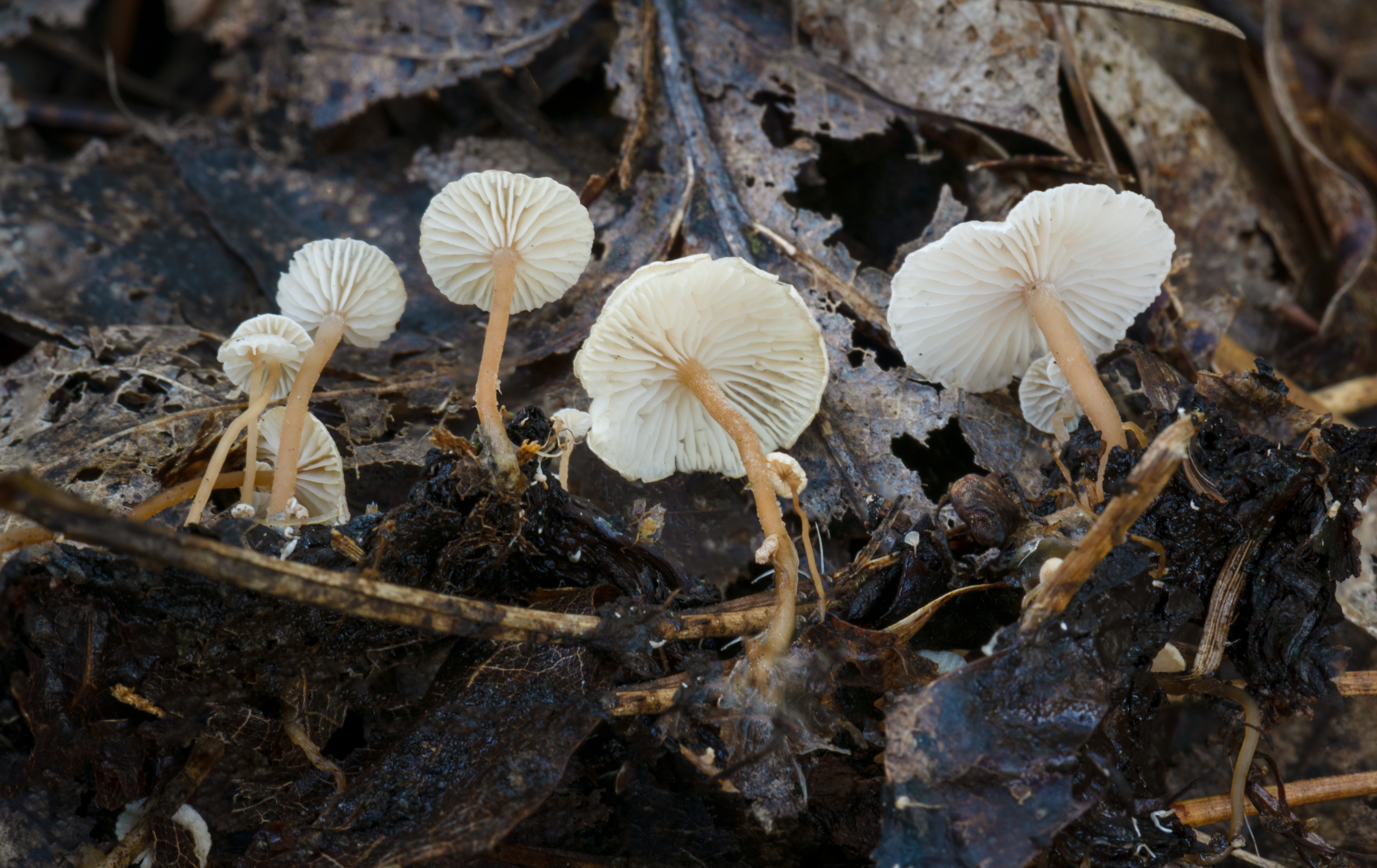

Scientific classification
- Kingdom: Fungi
- Division: Basidiomycota
- Class: Agaricomycetes
- Order: Agaricales
- Family: Clitocybaceae
- Genus: Collybia
- Species: C. cirrhata

Binomial name
- Collybia cirrhata (Schumach.) Quél. (1879)

Synonyms
- Agaricus amanitae Batsch (1786); Agaricus amanitae subsp. cirrhata Pers. (1800); Agaricus cirrhatus Schumach. (1803); Sclerotium truncorum (Tode) Fr. (1822); Microcollybia cirrhata (Schumach.) Georges Métrod (1952); Microcollybia cirrhata (Schumach.) Lennox (1979); Collybia amanitae (Batsch) Kreisel (1987)

= Collybia cirrhata =

Species of fungus

Collybia cirrhata
- Mycological characteristics
- Gills on hymenium
- Cap is convex or flat
- Hymenium is adnate
- Stipe is bare
- Spore print is white
- Ecology is saprotrophic
- Edibility is poisonous

Collybia cirrhata, the piggyback shanklet, is a species of fungus in the family Tricholomataceae of the order Agaricales (gilled mushrooms). The species was first described in the scientific literature in 1786, but was not validly named until 1803. Found in Europe, Northern Eurasia, and North America, it is known from temperate, boreal, and alpine or arctic habitats. It is a saprobic species that grows in clusters on the decaying or blackened remains of other mushrooms. The fruit bodies are small, with whitish convex to flattened caps up to 11 mm (3/8 in) in diameter, narrow white gills, and slender whitish stems 8–25 mm (3/8–1 in) long and up to 2 mm (0.08 in) thick. C. cirrhata can be distinguished from the other two members of Collybia by the absence of a sclerotium at the base of the stem.

A 2023 chemical analysis found that this mushroom contains 17 to 56 mg/kg of the mycotoxin muscarine.

== Taxonomy and phylogeny ==
- - - - - Collybia tuberosa
        - Collybia cookei
      - Collybia cirrhata
    - Clitocybe dealbata
  - - - Dendrocollybia racemosa
      - Clitocybe connata
    - Hypsizygus ulmarius
    - Lepista nuda

Phylogeny and relationships of C. cirrhata and closely related fungi based on ribosomal DNA sequences.

The species first appeared in the scientific literature in 1786 as Agaricus amanitae by August Johann Georg Karl Batsch; Agaricus amanitae subsp. cirrhatus, proposed by Christian Hendrik Persoon in 1800, is considered synonymous. A later combination based on this name, Collybia amanitae, was published by Hanns Kreisel in 1987. However, Kreisel noted the combination to be "ined.", indicating that he did not believe the name to be validly published, according to article 34.1 of the rules for botanical nomenclature, which states: "A name is not validly published ... when it is not accepted by the author in the original publication."

The first valid name was published in 1803 by Heinrich Christian Friedrich Schumacher, who called the species Agaricus cirrhatus. French mycologist Lucien Quélet transferred it to Collybia in 1879, resulting in the binomial by which it is currently known. The species had also been transferred to Microcollybia by Georges Métrod in 1952 and again by Lennox in 1979 (because Métrod's transfer was considered a nomen nudum, and thus invalid according to nomenclatural rules); the genus Microcollybia has since been wrapped into Collybia.

Molecular phylogenetics have shown that C. cirrhata forms a monophyletic clade with the remaining two species of Collybia. Because C. cirrhata is the only one of the three Collybia species lacking sclerotia, it has been suggested that this character trait is an anapomorphy—that is, unique to a single, terminal species within a clade.

The specific epithet is derived from the Latin cirrata, meaning "curled". Charles Horton Peck called it the "fringed-rooted Collybia". In the United Kingdom, it is commonly known as the "piggyback shanklet".

== Description ==
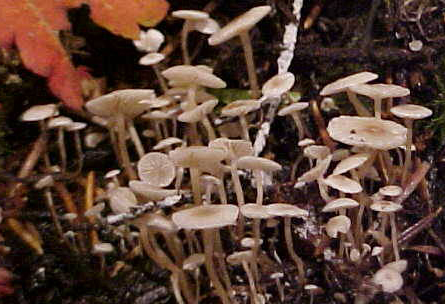
The small fruit bodies typically grow in dense clusters.

The cap is initially convex when young, later becoming convex to flattened or slightly depressed in the center, reaching a diameter of 3–11 mm (1/8–3/8 in). The cap margin starts out rolled or curved inward, but straightens out as it matures. The cap surface ranges from dry to moist, smooth to covered with fine whitish hairs, and is mostly even with translucent radial grooves at the margin. It is subhygrophanous (changing color somewhat depending on hydration), becoming a grayish-orange when watery or old, and usually is white with a very faint pinkish flush when fresh. The flesh is whitish, quite thin, and has no distinctive taste or odor. The gills are adnate to slightly arcuate (curved into the shape of a bow) with a tooth (meaning that the gills curve up to join the stem but then, very close to the stem, the gill edge curves down again). There are between 12 and 20 gills that extend completely from the cap edge to the stem, and three to five tiers of lamellulae (shorter gills that do not extend completely from the cap edge to the stem). The gills are thin, narrow to moderately broad, and white to pinkish-buff. The gill edges are even, and the same color as the gill faces.

The stem is 8–25 mm (3/8–1 in) long and up to 2 mm (1/16 in) thick, equal in width throughout to slightly enlarged downward, flexible and filamentous but not fragile. The stem surface is dry, whitish to grayish-orange, sometimes with tiny hairs on the upper portion that become coarser near the base. The stem base often has rhizomorph-like strands or copious whitish mycelia. The stem, unlike the other two species of Collybia, do not originate from a sclerotium. The stem becomes hollow as it matures. C. cirrhata is too small and insubstantial to be considered edible.

=== Microscopic characteristics ===
In deposit, the spores appear white. Individual spores are ellipsoid to tear-shaped in profile, obovoid to ellipsoid or roughly cylindric in face or back view, with dimensions of 4.8–6.4 by 2–2.8 (sometimes up to 3.5) μm. They are smooth, inamyloid, and acyanophilous (unreactive to staining with Melzer's reagent and methyl blue, respectively). The basidia (spore-bearing cells of the hymenium) are roughly club-shaped, four-spored, and measure 17.5–21 by 4.8–5.6 μm. The gills do not have cystidia. The gill tissue is made of hyphae that are interwoven to roughly parallel, and inamyloid. The hyphae are 2.8–8.4 μm in diameter and smooth. The cap tissue is made of interwoven hyphae beneath the center of the cap, but radially oriented over the gills; it too is inamyloid. These hyphae are 3.5–8.4 μm in diameter, smooth, but have irregularly thickened walls. The cap cuticle is an ixocutis—a gelatinized layer of hyphae lying parallel to the cap surface. The hyphae comprising this layer are 2.8–6.4 μm in diameter, smooth, and thin-walled. They are covered with scattered, short pouch-like outgrowths. The cuticle of the stem is a layer of parallel, vertically oriented hyphae; the hyphae measure 3.5–4.2 μm, and are smooth, slightly thick-walled, and pale yellowish-brown in alkaline solution. They give rise to a covering of tangled and branched caulocystidia (cystidia on the stem) that have multiple septa. The caulocystidia are 2.8–4.8 μm in diameter, smooth, thin walled, and shaped like contorted cylinders. Clamp connections are present in the hyphae of all tissues.

=== Similar species ===
Collybia cirrhata is most likely to be confused with the remaining members of Collybia, which have a similar external appearance. C. tuberosa is distinguished by its dark reddish-brown sclerotia that resemble apple seeds, while C. cookei has wrinkled, often irregularly shaped sclerotia that are pale yellow to orange. Other similar mushrooms include Baeospora myosura and species of Strobilurus, but these species only grow on pine cones.

== Habitat and distribution ==
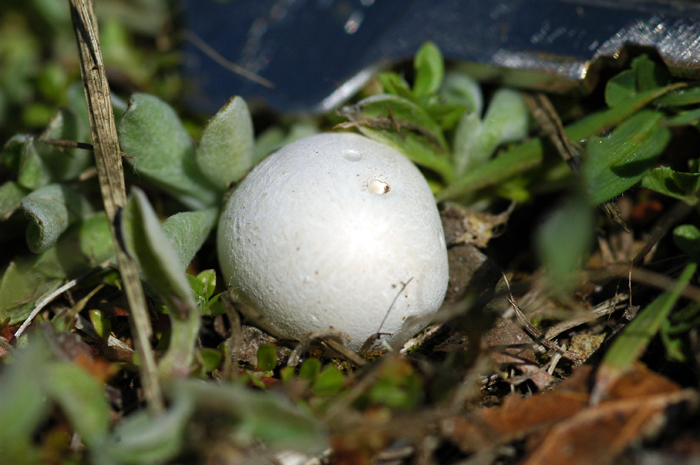
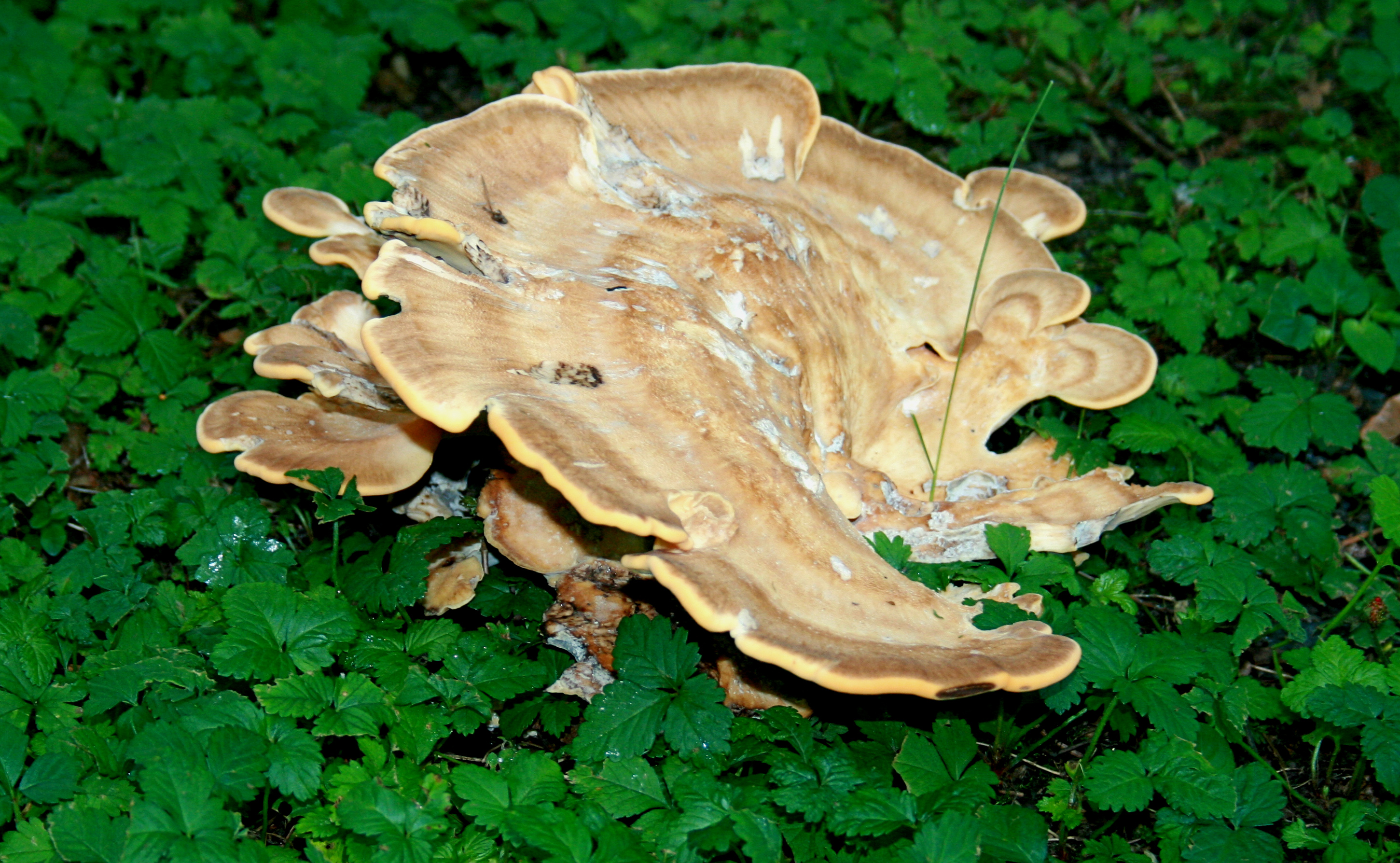
Collybia cirrhata grows on the old fruit bodies of fungi such as Bovista dermoxantha (left) and Meripilus giganteus (right).

Like all species remaining in the genus Collybia, C. cirrhata is saprobic, and is typically found growing on the decaying or blackened remains of other mushrooms; occasionally the fruit bodies may be found growing on moss or soil without any apparent connection to decaying mushrooms, although these observations may represent instances where the remnant host tissue—possibly from a previous season—has decayed to such an extent that it remains as buried fragments in the substrate. Known hosts include Lactarius, Russula, Meripilus giganteus, and Bovista dermoxantha.

Collybia cirrhata is known from temperate, boreal, and alpine or arctic habitats. The fungus is widespread in Europe, including Bulgaria, Denmark, Germany, Greece, Latvia, Scandinavia, Slovakia, Switzerland, Turkey, and the United Kingdom. The mushroom is also common in northern montane regions of North America. In Asia, the fungus has been reported in Korea, and in Hokkaido, northern Japan. It is also known from Greenland. A 2009 publication suggested that based on the known evidence, the species' distribution may be circumboreal.
