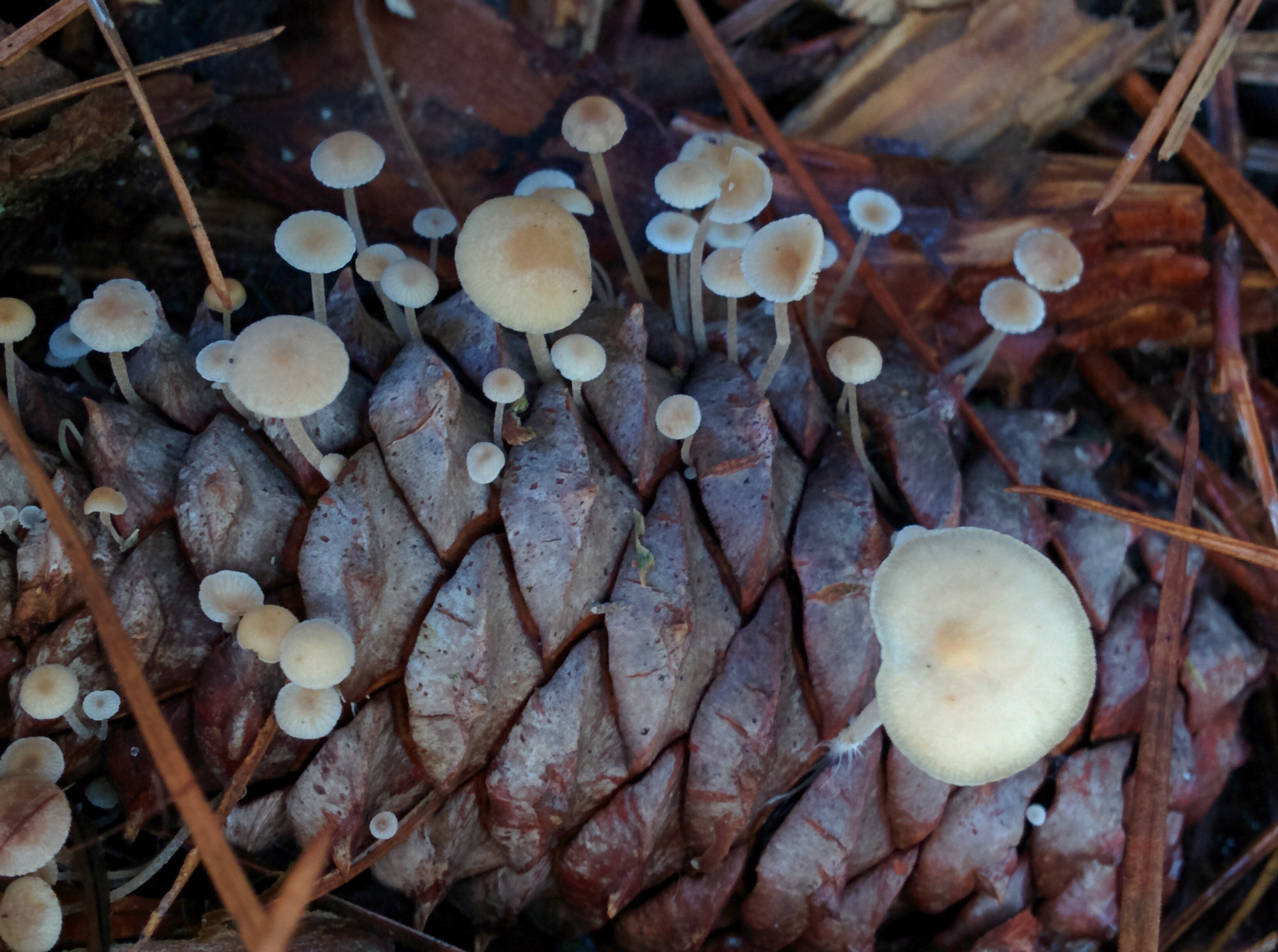
- Baeospora myosura

Scientific classification
- Kingdom: Fungi
- Division: Basidiomycota
- Class: Agaricomycetes
- Order: Agaricales
- Family: Cyphellaceae
- Genus: Baeospora; Singer (1938)

Type species
- Baeospora myosura (Fr.) Singer (1938)

= Baeospora =

Genus of fungi

Baeospora is a genus of fungi in the family Cyphellaceae. Basidiocarps (fruit bodies) are agarics. The genus was circumscribed by mycologist Rolf Singer in 1938. The most recently described species, B. occidentalis, is a snowbank fungus that was discovered in montane coniferous forests of the western USA.

== Species ==
- B. brunneipes
- B. cristobalensis
- B. curtipes
- B. mundula
- B. myosura
- B. familia
- B. myriadophylla
- B. occidentalis
- B. pallida
- B. pleurotoides
- B. rubrinigrescens
- B. stenophylla
- B. violaceifolia
