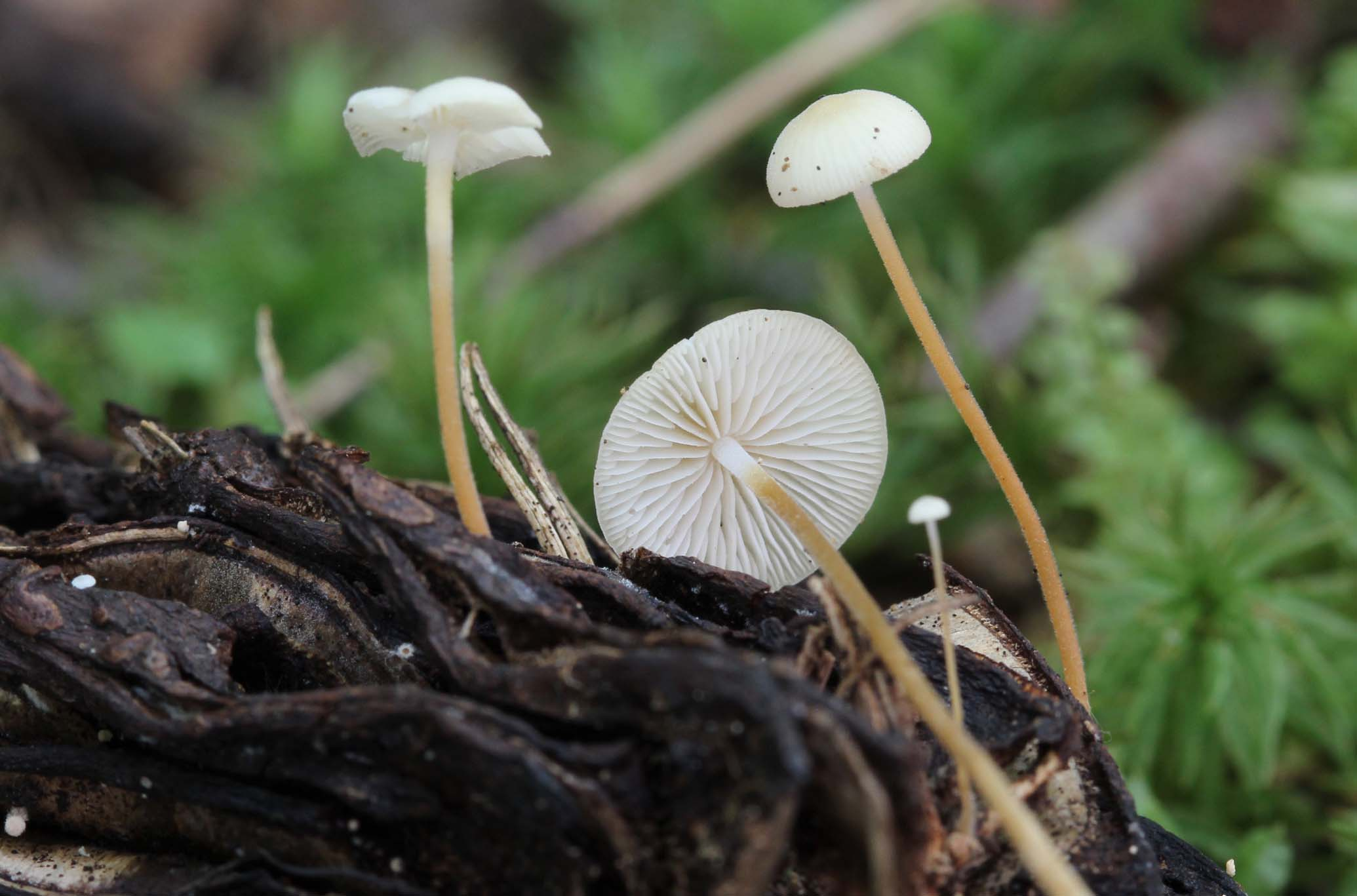

Scientific classification
- Kingdom: Fungi
- Division: Basidiomycota
- Class: Agaricomycetes
- Order: Agaricales
- Family: Physalacriaceae
- Genus: Strobilurus
- Species: S. conigenoides

Binomial name
- Strobilurus conigenoides (Ellis) Singer (1962)

= Strobilurus conigenoides =

Species of agaric fungus

Strobilurus conigenoides is a species of agaric fungus in the Physalacriaceae family. It is commonly known as the Magnolia-cone mushroom, as it grows upon the fallen "cones", or follicles, of several species of Magnolia spp. Strobilurus congenoides is distributed mainly in southeastern North America and occurs most often in autumn.

== Taxonomy ==
Initially, in 1878, the species was first classified as Marasmius bombycirrhizus by Berk and Cooke, who published their findings in the Grevillea journal.

The species name underwent an additional change in 1876, after the Torrey Botanical Club renamed the fungus Agaricus conigenoides.

In 1962, the species experienced another name change, at last being placed in the genus Strobilurus, with other small, saprotrophic mushrooms that primarily grow on conifer cones. The fungus was named Strobilurus conigenoides and published in the Persoonia journal.

== Description ==
The white to yellowish cap is up to 12 millimetres (1/2 in) wide. The stem is translucent when young, becoming yellow, except for a white band at the top. The spore print is white.

=== Similar species ===
Most species within the genus Strobilurus, including S. conigenoides, contain common characteristics, including collybiod fruiting bodies, also known as basidiomes, with a pseudorhiza, inamyloid basidiospores, the presence of both dermatocystidia and hymenial cystidia, the cellular epicutis of the pileus, and a lack of clamp connections.

Baeospora myosura and Mycena crocea are similar.

== Ecology ==
Strobilurus conigenoides is widely reported to be specific to follicles of Magnolia (e.g. M. fraseri, M. grandiflora, M. tripetala, and M. acuminata). However, in a study published in 1991, the species was said to be found on fruits of Liquidambar styraciflua (American sweetgum).
