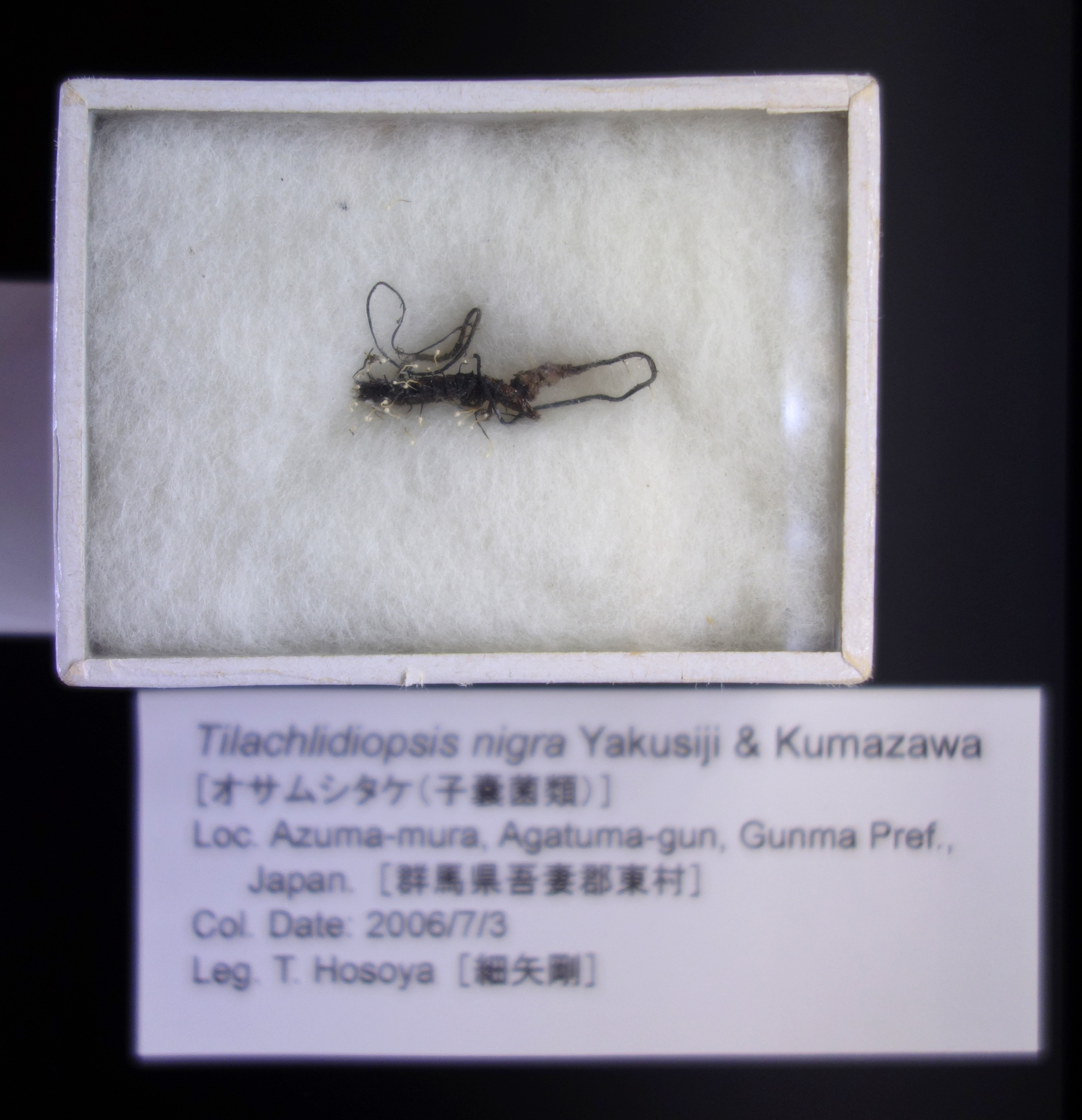
- Tilachlidiopsis nigra

Scientific classification
- Kingdom: Fungi
- Division: Basidiomycota
- Class: Agaricomycetes
- Order: Agaricales
- Family: Tricholomataceae
- Genus: Tilachlidiopsis; Keissl.

Type species
- Tilachlidiopsis racemosa Keissl.

Synonyms
- Sclerostilbum

= Tilachlidiopsis =

Genus of fungi

Tilachlidiopsis is a genus of fungi in the family Tricholomataceae. It is an anamorphic form of Collybia.

== See also ==
- List of Tricholomataceae genera
