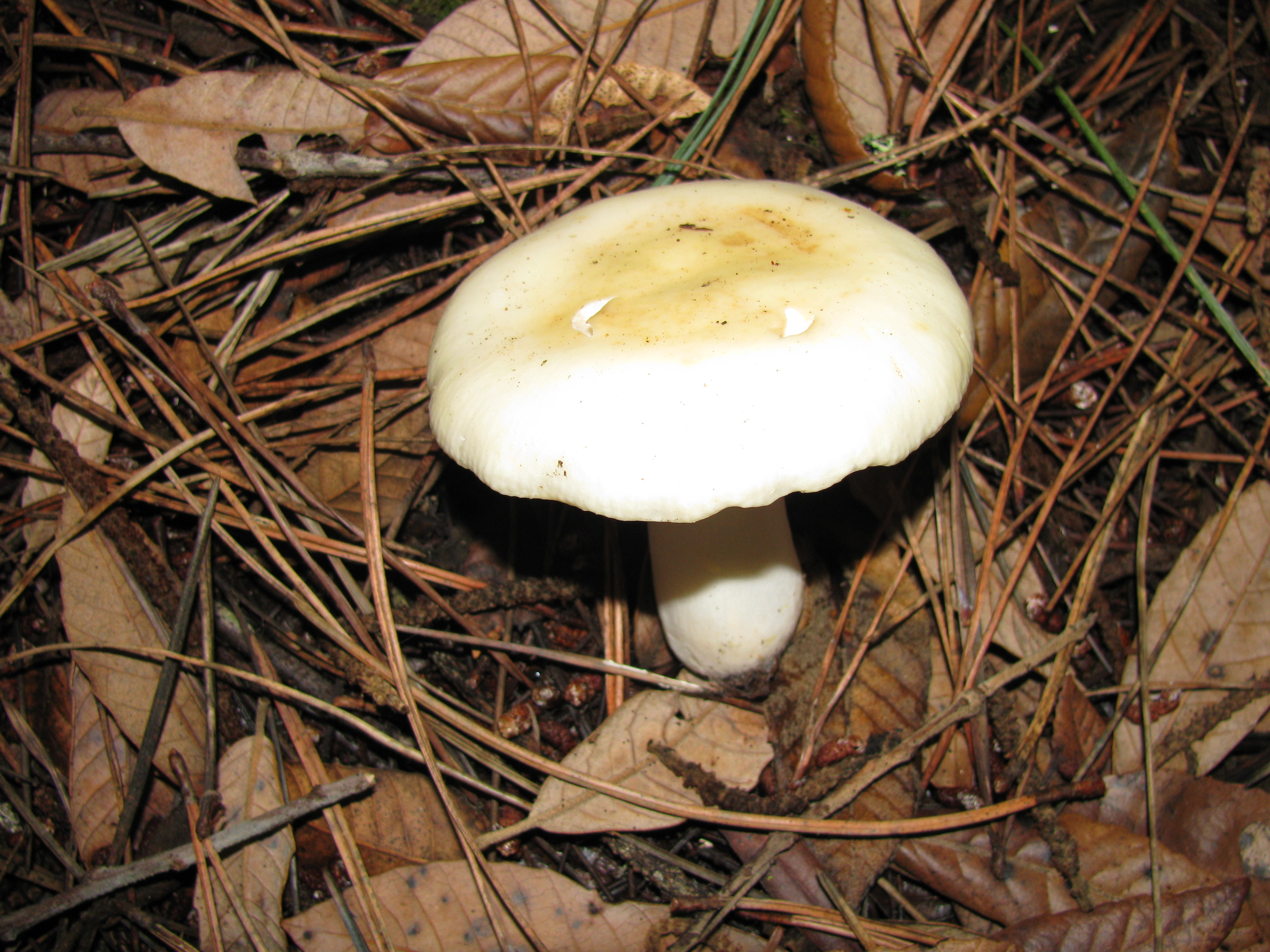

Scientific classification
- Kingdom: Fungi
- Division: Basidiomycota
- Class: Agaricomycetes
- Order: Russulales
- Family: Russulaceae
- Genus: Russula
- Species: R. crassotunicata

Binomial name
- Russula crassotunicata Singer (1938)

= Russula crassotunicata =

Species of fungus

Russula crassotunicata, commonly known as the rubbery-capped russula, is a North American fungus in the mushroom genus Russula. It was described by Rolf Singer in 1938 from a collection made in Washington state, United States.

The species is mostly white and often grows on rotted wood. It has been confirmed as a host of the parasitic fungus Dendrocollybia racemosa.

== See also ==
- List of Russula species
