= Ramsbottomia =

Scientific classification
- Domain: Eukaryota
- Kingdom: Fungi
- Division: Ascomycota
- Class: Pezizomycetes
- Order: Pezizales
- Family: Pyronemataceae
- Genus: Ramsbottomia; W.D. Buckley (1923)

Type species
- Ramsbottomia lamprosporoidea W.D. Buckley (1923)

Genus of fungi

Ramsbottomia is a genus of fungi in the family Pyronemataceae.

The genus name of Ramsbottomia is in honour of John Ramsbottom OBE FLS (1885–1974), who was a British mycologist.

The genus was circumscribed by W.D. Buckley in Trans. Brit. Mycol. Soc. vol.9 on page 44 in 1923.

== Species ==
As accepted by Species Fungorum;

- Ramsbottomia asperior (Nyl.) Benkert & T. Schumach. (1985)
- Ramsbottomia lamprosporoidea W.D. Buckley (1923)

Former species;

- R. crechqueraultii (P. Crouan & H. Crouan) Benkert & T. Schumach. (1985) now Lamprospora crechqueraultii (still in Pyronemataceae)
- R. macrantha (Boud.) Benkert & T. Schumach. (1985) now Lamprospora crechqueraultii
