= John Leonard Knapp =

English botanist and naturalist (1767–1845)

John Leonard Knapp (9 May 1767 – 29 April 1845) was an English botanist and naturalist. He is best known for his Journal of a Naturalist, and his work on British grasses.

== History ==
Born at Shenley, Buckinghamshire, John Leonard Knapp was the son of Primatt Knapp, rector of Shenley.

Educated at Thame grammar school, Knapp entered the navy, but finding the sea unsuited to his health, he resigned and served successively in the Herefordshire and Northamptonshire militia, becoming a captain in the latter.

He lived for a time at Powick, near Worcester, and was then in the habit of making long summer botanical excursions. On one of these he visited Scotland in company with Scottish botanist George Don and collected several of the rarest species of British native grasses.

=== Publications ===
In 1804 he published Gramina Britannica, or Representations of the British Grasses on 119 coloured plates, with Descriptions, in quarto, the figures being executed by himself. This edition was, with the exception of a hundred copies, destroyed by a fire at Bensley's, the printers, and the book was not reissued until 1842.

In 1818 Knapp published anonymously a poem entitled "Arthur, or the Pastor of the Village," and between 1820 and 1830 a series of articles, under the title of ‘The Naturalist's Diary,’ in the almanac series ‘Time's Telescope.’

These formed the germ of his most successful work, the Journal of a Naturalist, published anonymously in 1829, which went through three editions during his lifetime. It was published in America in 1853 as Country Rambles in England with an introduction and notes by Susan Fenimore Cooper. Knapp viewed it as a botanical companion to Gilbert White's ‘Selborne.’

=== Personal life ===
He lived till 1813 at Llanfoist, near Abergavenny, and subsequently at Alveston, near Bristol, where he died.

In 1804 he married Lydia Frances Freeman (1772-1838), daughter of Arthur Freeman of Antigua, by whom he had seven children; two sons and a daughter survived him. His son Arthur John Knapp (d. 1883) was a Bristol solicitor and one of the original promoters of the Great Western Railway.

== Commemoration ==
Knapp became in 1796 a fellow of the Linnean Society, and was also a fellow of the Society of Antiquaries.

The genus of grasses previously named Mibora by Michel Adanson was renamed Knappia by Smith, although the original name is now used. Rhynchoglossum, originally named by Carl Ludwig Blume, was similarly unsuccessfully renamed Knappia by Franz Bauer in 1840.

Taxonomy
