= Charles Melville (cricketer) =

Scottish cricketer and physician

Personal information
- Full name: Charles Melville
- Born: 9 April 1896; Falkirk, Stirlingshire, Scotland
- Died: 25 March 1954 (aged 57); Dumfries, Dumfriesshire, Scotland
- Batting: Right-handed
- Bowling: Unknown

Domestic team information
- Years: Team
- 1928–1929: Scotland

Career statistics
Competition	First-class
Matches	3
Runs scored	50
Batting average	10.00
100s/50s	–/–
Top score	24
Balls bowled	294
Wickets	3
Bowling average	50.00
5 wickets in innings	–
10 wickets in match	–
Best bowling	2/72
Catches/stumpings	–/–
- Source: Cricinfo, 3 July 2022

Charles Melville (9 April 1896 — 25 March 1954) was a Scottish first-class cricketer and physician.

Melville was born at Falkirk in April 1896. He studied medicine at the University of Glasgow, graduating in 1920; his studies had been interrupted in 1914 by the start of the First World War, with him serving in the British Army during the war. He entered into general practice at Grangemouth in 1922, during which time he continued his studies to gain his Doctor of Public Health in 1925. A club cricketer for Stirling County Cricket Club, Melville made his debut for Scotland in first-class cricket against Ireland at Edinburgh in 1928. He made two further first-class appearances for Scotland in 1929, against Ireland at Dublin and the touring Australians at Perth. Playing as a bowler in the Scottish side, Melville took 3 wickets at an average of exactly 50 in first-class cricket, with best figures of 2 for 72. As a batsman, he scored 50 runs with a highest score of 24.

As a medical practitioner, he maintained his general practice at Grangemouth for 26 years, in addition to becoming an assistant in the ear, nose, and throat department at Falkirk Royal Infirmary; upon the retirement of the head of department, Dr. George Brand, Melville assumed his position. With the creation of the National Health Service, Melville resigned from his practice to concentrate on his private consultancy. In 1951, a vascular lesion forced him to give up his medical practice. He died at Dumfries in March 1954, following a long illness.
