= James Kirkham Ramsbottom =

English botanist

James Kirkham Ramsbottom (11 October 1891 – 9 February 1925) was an English botanist. He became interested in the field after he was recommended to pursue an outdoor career for his health. After a short period at the Chelsea Physic Garden, Ramsbottom studied at the RHS Garden Wisley. Coming first in their diploma examinations, Ramsbottom became a research student at the Royal Horticultural Society (RHS) in 1913. He studied leaf blotch disease in irises and became assistant editor of Gardeners' Magazine.

In March 1916, Ramsbottom was appointed to lead a study into a mysterious disease, known as "rootless disease", that was affecting daffodil (Narcissus) bulbs and threatened the destruction of the nascent daffodil-growing industry. The disease had been known for around 30 years, but its cause was not certain, although a number of pests and fungi were suspected. By April 1917 Ramsbottom was able to prove the disease was caused by an infestation of the Ditylenchus dipsaci nematode and developed a treatment involving dipping affected bulbs in hot water. The treatment saved the daffodil-growing industry and remains the basis for modern-day treatment of the disease. Ramsbottom continued to work on the treatment and was invited to lecture in the United States. He died in New York by either falling or jumping from a 19th-storey window in the Hotel McAlpin.

== Early life ==
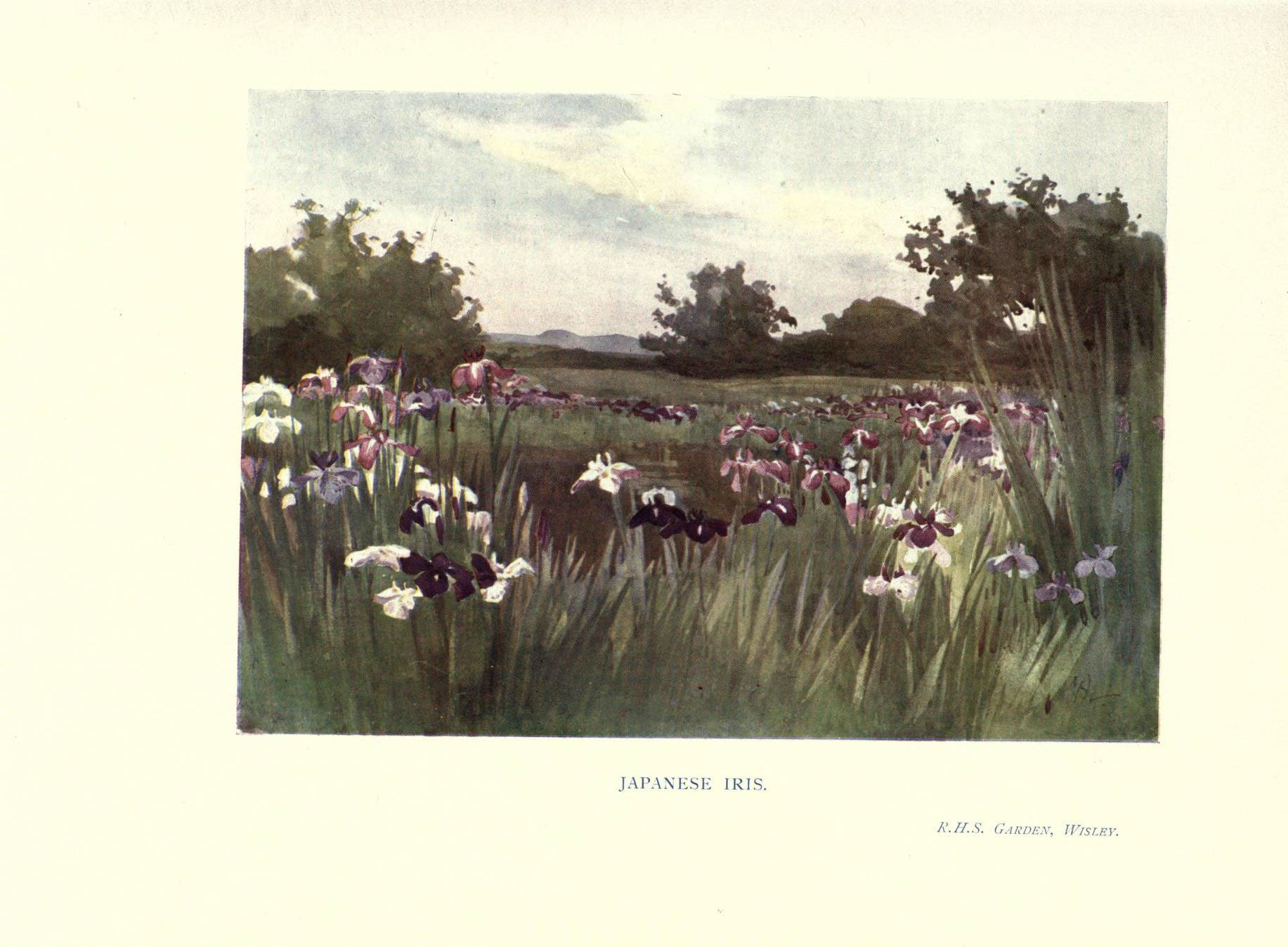
A depiction of irises at Wisley in 1905

Ramsbottom was born in Manchester on 11 October 1891. Because of poor health he was advised to seek an outdoor career. Ramsbottom worked as a gardener at the Chelsea Physic Garden in London before studying at the RHS Garden Wisley from 1911. He gained first place in the Royal Horticultural Society's (RHS) diploma examination and won a gold medal for scholarship. Ramsbottom became an RHS research student in 1913, studying leaf blotch disease in irises; an account of his study was published in the Journal of the Royal Horticultural Society in 1915. From 1914 to 1916 Ramsbottom served as an assistant editor of Gardeners' Magazine.

== Narcissus stem and bulb nematode ==
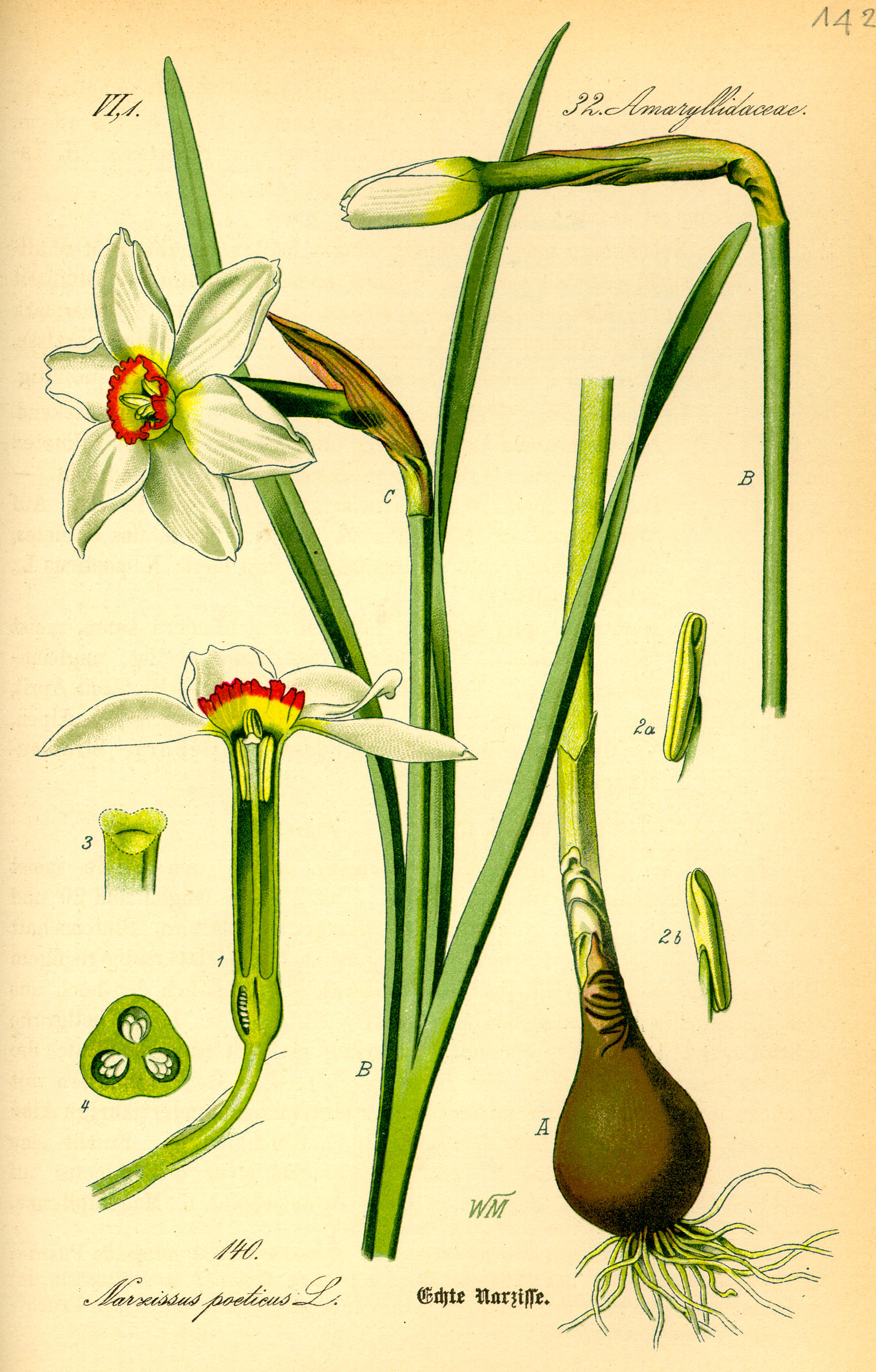
A study of a Narcissus showing flower, stem and bulb

By 1916 the nascent British daffodil (Narcissus) growing industry was in danger of collapse. The industry had been devastated for the previous ten years by a mysterious plague predominantly affecting the bulb of the plant. The cause of the plague, which became known as "rootless disease", was unknown, though some suspected it was caused by waterlogged soil or the actions of narcissus bulb fly (Merodon equestris) maggots, eelworms (nematodes), mites or a fungus. There was no known cure, and hundreds of acres of crops were lost. Growers faced bankruptcy; one lost almost £12,000 of bulbs in a single season.

The disease was not new and was first noted at an 1887 conference of the Royal Horticultural Society. It became more widespread after the exchange of bulbs of hybridised varieties among growers, common in the early period of the industry. The disease had also reached Narcissus growers in the Netherlands. During the early part of the First World War (1914–18), the RHS had declined to investigate the disease as it was instead focussed on improving domestic food production for the war effort. By 1916 attitudes had relaxed a little, and it was suggested that the society study the disease at a March meeting of the RHS Narcissus and Tulip Committee. Ramsbottom was appointed to lead the study, and the RHS requested that growers send him samples of affected bulbs, leading to him receiving hundreds within weeks. Ramsbottom said at the time: "Many bulb growers look upon the disease as 'one of nature's gifts' and are of the opinion that the bulbs will ultimately right themselves. Suffice it to say that if the bulbs are left to themselves, the bulb industry will soon cease to exist".

Ramsbottom dissected the bulbs to produce thousands of microscope slides, which he studied for pathogens. He noted that while many contained fungal infections, all of the bulbs he checked showed the presence of the nematode Ditylenchus dipsaci, first discovered by Friedrich Adalbert Maximilian Kuhn in 1858. Ramsbottom demonstrated that the mites and flies present were not the initial pathogen but were attracted by rotting caused by the action of the nematode.

Having found the cause, Ramsbottom trialled different treatments to determine their effectiveness against the nematode and impact on the viability of the bulb. He applied a number of liquid and gaseous chemicals, including formaldehyde, before concluding that immersing the bulbs in a hot water bath at 110 °F (43 °C) for 2–4 hours was effective and left the bulbs unharmed. This method had been used in the pre-war period to treat infestations of fly maggots. He also advised growers to harvest daffodils higher up the stem to avoid reinfection by nematodes moving from the soil into the cut stem.

Ramsbottom's findings were to have been presented at the RHS Daffodil Show on 17 April 1917 but this was cancelled; many daffodil shows in this period were abandoned because of the disease. Ramsbottom's paper was instead read at a meeting of the RHS on 8 May 1917 and published, as "Investigations on Narcissus Disease", in the society's journal in 1918. Ramsbottom went on to prove the effectiveness of his treatment in commercial stocks in 1919, in the process probably saving many early varieties, such as the "Carlton". A further paper on the disease ("Contributions from the Wisley laboratory. 31. Experiments on the control of eelworm disease of narcissus") appeared in the Journal of the Royal Horticultural Society in 1919.

Ramsbottom's study saved the British daffodil industry from destruction. Ditylenchus dipsaci is now known as the stem and bulb nematode because of its means of infection, proven by Ramsbottom, and it remains the most significant pest in daffodils. Ramsbottom's treatment for the infection remains the basis of modern nematode control in daffodils, though by the 1960s, a slightly higher temperature of 114–115 °F (46–46 °C) was preferred.

== Later career and death ==
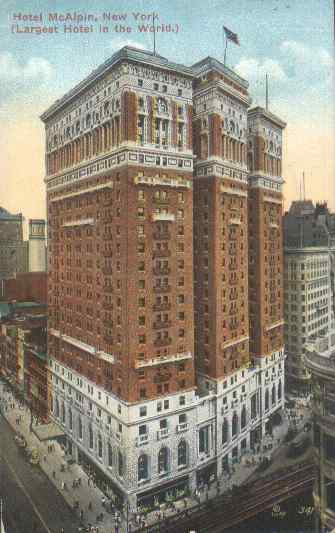
A 1914 depiction of the Hotel McAlpin

After studying the disease, Ramsbottom spent five years experimenting with and perfecting apparatus for the commercial treatment of bulbs and worked closely with many growers. Because of his efforts he was awarded the RHS Peter Barr Memorial Cup in 1924. In 1924 he served as assistant editor of The Gardeners' Chronicle.

Ramsbottom's study on the stem and bulb nematode led to him becoming famous in horticultural circles in the United States. He travelled there on a lecture tour but died in New York on 9 February 1925 either by falling or jumping from the 19th floor of the Hotel McAlpin.

The 1967 Daffodil Yearbook describes Ramsbottom's death as "a grievous loss to the narcissus industry that no man can measure". Fiona Davison of the RHS said in 2018 that "we wouldn't have the richness of daffodils and narcissus if it wasn't for him ... He's completely forgotten now." The RHS exhibits Ramsbottom's equipment at the Wisley laboratories and has also erected a plaque in his memory. The daffodil cultivar “J.K. Ramsbottom” is named after him.
