= John Ramsbottom (mycologist) =

British mycologist

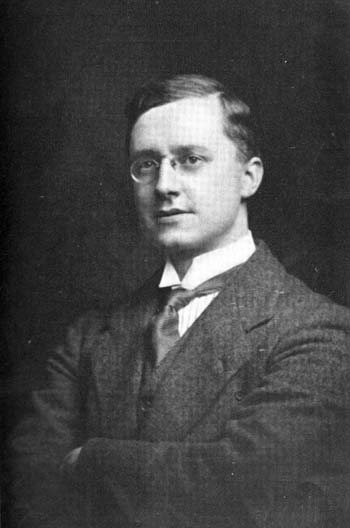
- John Ramsbottom c.1923
- Born: 25 October 1885; Manchester, England
- Died: 14 December 1974 (aged 89); Richmond Upon Thames, Surrey
- Awards: Linnean Medal (1965)
- Scientific career
- Fields: Mycology

John Ramsbottom OBE FLS (15 October 1885 – 14 December 1974) was a British mycologist.

== Biography ==
Ramsbottom was born in Manchester. He graduated from Emmanuel College, Cambridge, and joined the staff of the British Museum of Natural History in 1910.

From 1917 to 1919, he served in Salonika, Greece, first as a civilian protozoologist, then as captain in the Royal Army Medical Corps. He was appointed a Member of the Order of the British Empire in the 1919 New Year Honours, "for valuable services rendered in connection with Military Operations in Salonika," and later appointed an Officer of the Order.

From 1929 to 1950, he was Keeper of Botany at the British Museum. He served as general secretary and twice as president of the British Mycological Society, and was long editor of its Transactions. He was president of the Quekett Microscopical Club from 1928 to 1931 and was elected an Honorary Member in 1937. He was president of the Linnean Society from 1937 to 1940 and was awarded their Linnean Medal in 1965. Ramsbottom was President of the Society for the History of Natural History from 1943 to 1972. He was made an Honorary Member in 1972.

== Legacy ==
Dr Ramsbottom made a bequest to the Society in his will and it was decided to utilise this to establish The Ramsbottom Lecture, to be given at the Society's International Meetings, the first being delivered in April 1976.

In 1923, W.D. Buckley in Trans. Brit. Mycol. Soc. vol.9 published Ramsbottomia, which is a genus of fungi in the family Pyronemataceae and named in Ramsbottom's honour.

== Works ==
Ramsbottom had a lively style both in his lectures and in his writing, which spanned both popular and technical publications. He could write:

In reading the old accounts one finds a strange mixture of fact and fantasy. Some are so fantastic that if they had not been accepted by other authors they would not find a place in even a most detailed historical summary. Then there comes an observation of such merit that all seems set for real progress. But these facts, even when accepted, are often misinterpreted, almost as if in a superfluity of naughtiness, and again there is confusion.

— John Ramsbottom, Mushrooms & Toadstools, 1953, p. 17

Notable among his published works are:

- (1917) "George Edward Massee" Journal of Botany 55: p. 225
- (1923) A handbook of the larger British Fungi British Museum, Dep't of Botany, London, OCLC 4142558 illustrated with engravings by Worthington George Smith.
- (1943) Edible Fungi Penguin Books, London
- (1945) Poisonous fungi Penguin Books, London, OCLC 220637
- (1953) Mushrooms and Toadstools: A Study of the Activities of Fungi Collins, London, OCLC 657799
