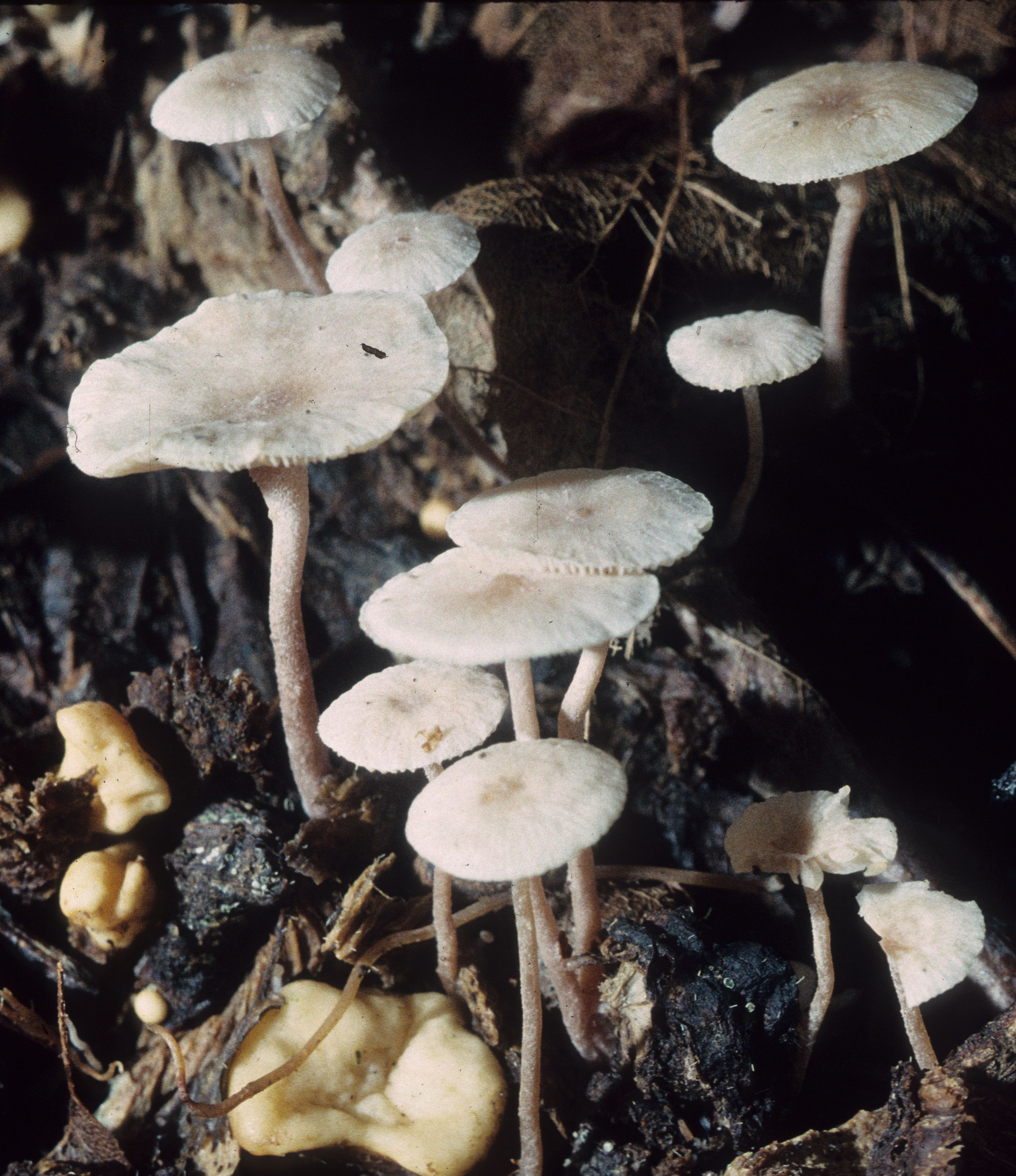

Scientific classification
- Kingdom: Fungi
- Division: Basidiomycota
- Class: Agaricomycetes
- Order: Agaricales
- Family: Clitocybaceae
- Genus: Collybia
- Species: C. cookei

Binomial name
- Collybia cookei (Bres.) J.D.Arnold (1935)

Synonyms
- Collybia cirrhata var. cookei Bres. (1928); Microcollybia cookei (Bres.) Lennox (1979); Collybia tuberosa var. cookei (Bres.) Bon & Courtec. (1987)

= Collybia cookei =

Species of fungus

Collybia cookei
- Mycological characteristics
- Gills on hymenium
- Cap is convex or flat
- Hymenium is adnate
- Stipe is bare
- Spore print is white
- Ecology is saprotrophic
- Edibility is unknown

Collybia cookei, the split-pea shanklet, is a species of fungus in the family Tricholomataceae, and one of three species in the genus Collybia. It is known from Europe, Asia, and North America. The fungus produces fruit bodies that usually grow on the decomposing remains of other mushrooms, like Meripilus giganteus, Inonotus hispidus, or species of Russula; occasionally fruit bodies are found on rich humus or well-decayed wood. The fungus produces small white mushrooms with caps up to 9 mm (0.35 in) in diameter, supported by thin stems that originate from a yellowish-brown sclerotium. The mushroom is difficult to distinguish from the other two species of Collybia unless an effort is made to examine the sclerotia, which is usually buried in the substrate. The edibility of the mushroom has not been determined.

== Taxonomy and phylogeny ==
- - - - - Collybia tuberosa
        - Collybia cookei
      - Collybia cirrhata
    - Clitocybe dealbata
  - - - Dendrocollybia racemosa
      - Clitocybe connata
    - Hypsizygus ulmarius
    - Lepista nuda

Phylogeny and relationships of C. cookei and closely related fungi based on ribosomal DNA sequences.

The species was first described in the scientific literature in 1928 as Collybia cirrhata var. cookei by the Italian mycologist Giacomo Bresadola. In a 1935 publication, Jean D. Arnold reported a series of cultural studies with monokaryon isolates (hypha having only a single haploid nucleus) of several Collybia species to determine their mating type. All attempts to produce hybrids between C. cirrhata var. cookei and C. cirrata or mycelial fusions between the two species failed. This sexual incompatibility indicated that the two taxa were separate species, and she raised the taxon from varietal to specific status, calling it Collybia cookei. The species has also been called Microcollybia cookei in a 1979 publication by Joanne Lennox, but the genus Microcollybia has since been folded into Collybia. Marcel Bon and Régis Courtecuisse considered the species a variety of Collybia tuberosa in a 1988 publication. A 2001 molecular analysis based on the ribosomal DNA sequences confirmed that C. cookei is phylogenetically related to C. tuberosa and C. cirrhata, and that the three species form a monophyletic group that comprise the genus Collybia.

The specific epithet cookei honors the British mycologist Mordecai Cubitt Cooke.

== Description ==
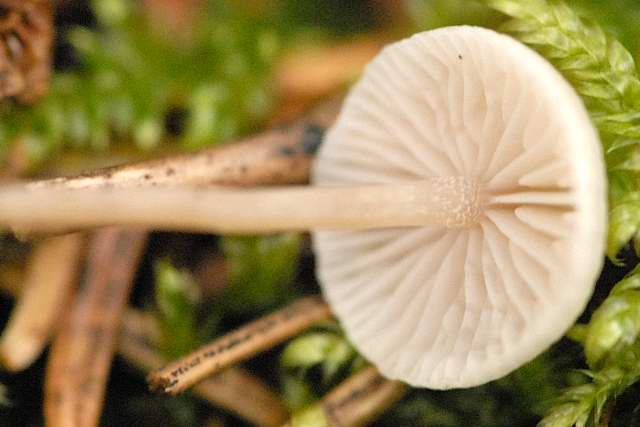
The gills attachment to the stem is adnate, and their spacing is close to subdistant.

The caps of young mushrooms are roughly spherical, but soon become convex to flattened in maturity, and reach diameters of 2–9 mm (0.08–0.35 in). The cap margin is rolled or curled inward when young, but straightens out as it matures. The cap color is white to cream. The gills are broadly adnate to slightly decurrent, with a color similar to the cap; their spacing is close to subdistant. The whitish stem is equal in width throughout, usually not straight but with curves, and 2–5 cm (0.8–2.0 in) long by 0.3–1.0 mm (0.01–0.04 in) thick. The upper region of the stem surface can be covered with what appears to be a white powder, and there are thin hairs near the base. The stems originate from a yellowish-brown sclerotium that is up to 6 mm (0.24 in) long. The sclerotium ranges in shape from roughly spherical to almond-shaped to irregular, and its surface is often wrinkled and pitted. The mushroom has no distinctive odor or taste, and its edibility is unknown.

In deposit, the spore color is white. The spores are smooth, ellipsoidal to tear-shaped, hyaline (translucent), not amyloid, and measure 3.9–5.2 by 2.6–3.3 μm. The basidia (spore-bearing cells in the hymenium) are four-spored and hyaline, with dimensions of 16–20 by 4–5 μm. They have clamps at their bases. There are no cystidia on either the edges (cheilocystidia) or faces (pleurocystidia) of the gills. The arrangement of the hyphae in the hymenophoral tissue varies from regular to interwoven. The cap cuticle is a cutis (a type of tissue where the hyphae are arranged more or less parallel to the surface), formed by hyphae with septa, roughly 4–9 μm in diameter. Clamp connections are present in the hyphae. The sclerotium is made of hyphae that have yellow pigment in their walls that appear in cross-section to be pseudoparenchymatous (compactly interwoven short-celled hyphae that resemble parenchyma of higher plants), and measure 5–10 μm in diameter.

=== Similar species ===
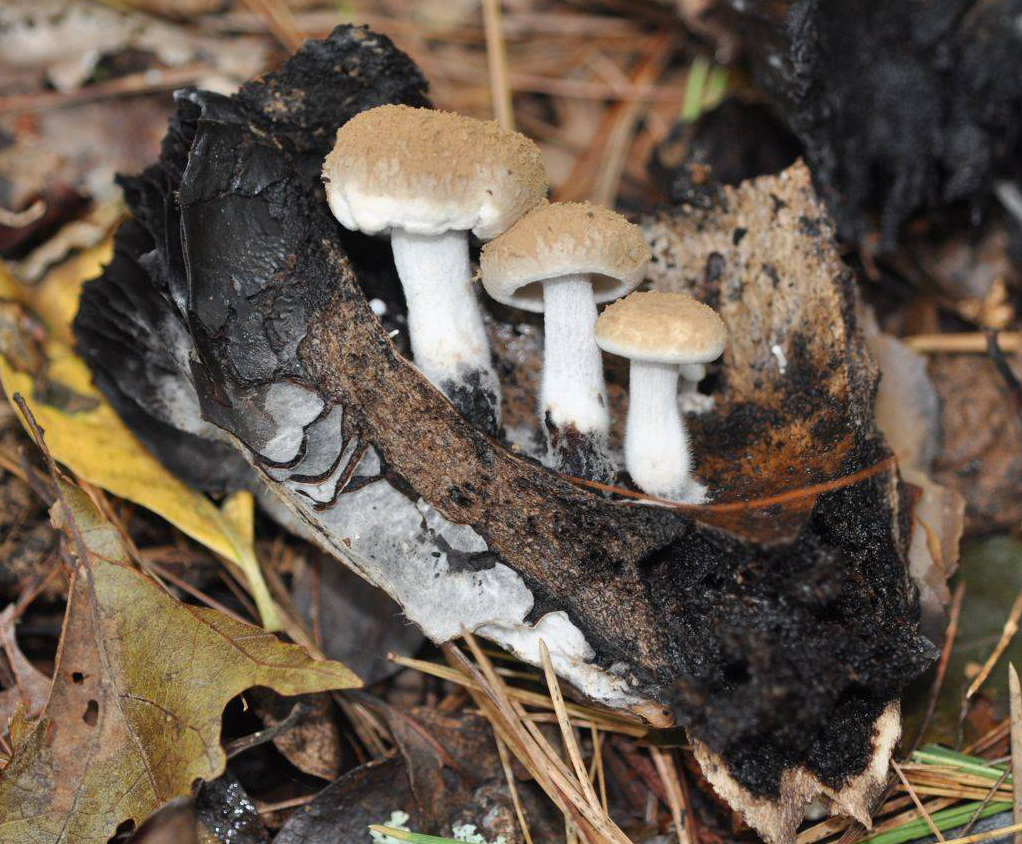
Asterophora lycoperdoides has thicker stems and brown powder on the cap surface.

Collybia cookei is most likely to be confused with the two other members of Collybia, both of which are outwardly similar in appearance; distinguishing between the three typically requires excavating the stem base away from the moss or debris in which the stem is embedded. In the field, C. tuberosa may be distinguished from C. cookei by its dark brown sclerotia that somewhat resembles an appleseed. Using a microscope provides a more definitive way of distinguishing the two: the hyphae in the sclerotia of C. cookei are rounded, while those of C. tuberosa are elongated; this diagnostic character is apparent with both fresh and dried material of the two species. C. cirrhata does not produce sclerotia.

Another mushroom that grows on decomposing fruit bodies is Asterophora lycoperdoides, which is distinct from C. cookei because of the powdery brown asexual spores (chlamydospores) produced on the cap surface. Alexander H. Smith has noted a general similarity in appearance between C. cookei and the North American species Clitocybe sclerotoidea (then known as Tricholoma sclerotoideum), which is parasitic to Helvella lacunosa. However, C. sclerotoidea is larger than C. cookei, with cap diameters up to 3 cm (1.2 in), and has more distantly spaced gills.

== Habitat and distribution ==
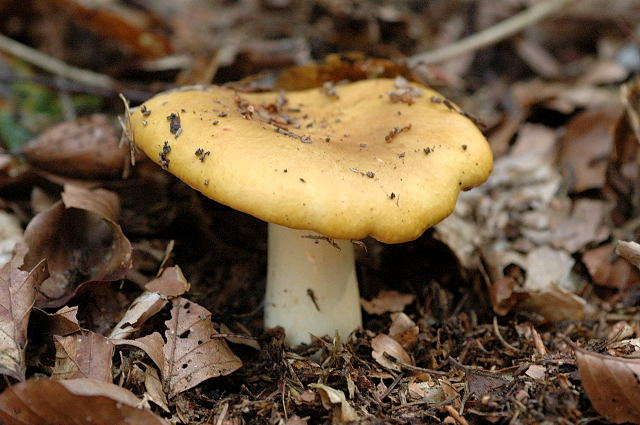
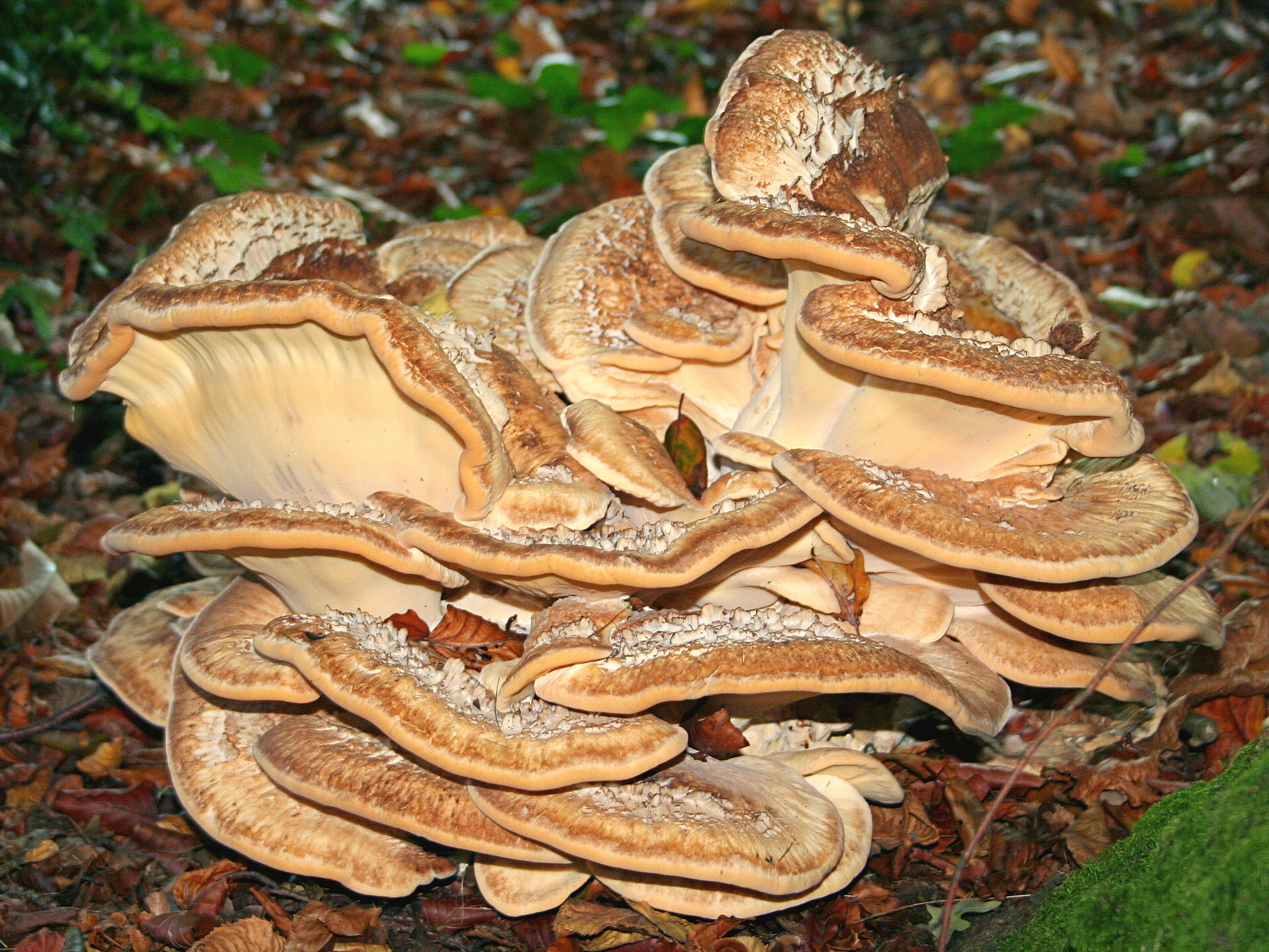
Host mushrooms for C. cookei include Russula ochroleuca (left) and Meripilus giganteus (right).

Like all members of the genus Collybia, C. cookei grows on the well-rotted, blackened remains of mushrooms, such as species of Russula, Meripilus giganteus, and Inonotus hispidus. Fruit bodies occasionally grow on well-decayed wood or rich humus. The fruit bodies grow scattered, clustered, or in groups. A field study conducted near a Brass mill in Sweden revealed that heavy metal contamination had little effect on the appearance of the mushroom, possibly because its substrate of partially decomposed fruit bodies has a lower metal concentration that the underlying topsoil.

Collybia cookei is found in Europe, Asia (Japan), and North America. The European distribution extends north to the Arctic Circle and the Lofoten Islands. The species is widely distributed in North America; it was reported from Mexico for the first time in 1998. The fungus is partial to mixed forest dominated by aspen and conifers in montane and subalpine environments. In The Netherlands, it was a component of one of three communities of saprobic fungi associated with roadside verges (the land between the road edge and the adjacent wall, fence or hedge) planted with common oak (Quercus robur); the verges also supported the growth of the mushroom Russula ochroleuca, a host of C. cookei.
