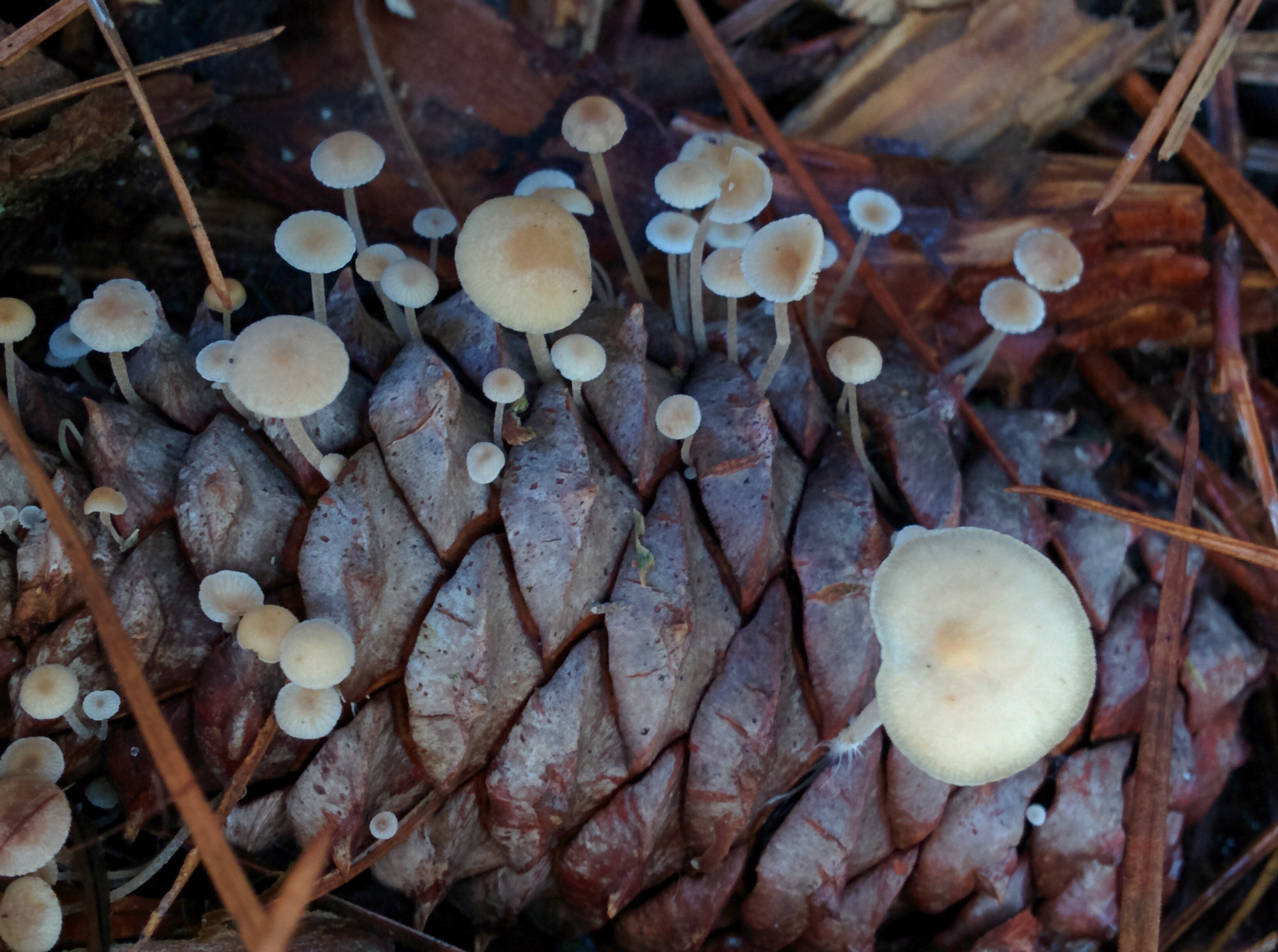

Scientific classification
- Kingdom: Fungi
- Division: Basidiomycota
- Class: Agaricomycetes
- Order: Agaricales
- Family: Cyphellaceae
- Genus: Baeospora
- Species: B. myosura

Binomial name
- Baeospora myosura (Fr.) Singer (1938)

= Baeospora myosura =

Species of fungus

- Mycological characteristics
- Gills on hymenium
- Cap is convex
- Hymenium is adnexed
- Stipe is bare
- Spore print is white to cream
- Ecology is saprotrophic
- Edibility is unknown

Baeospora myosura, commonly known as conifercone cap, is a species of fungus that produces agaricoid fruit bodies. The cap is convex before flattening, 2 centimetres (3/4 in) wide, and coloured pale brown to cream. The lamellae are adnexed, pale, and very close. The spore print is white to cream and amyloid.

The mushroom grows on decaying conifer cones and is common in North America and Europe. It is nonpoisonous but of unknown edibility.
