= Villiers =

Villiers may refer to:

== Places ==
=== France ===
- Villiers, Indre, in the Indre département
- Villiers, Vienne, in the Vienne département
- Villiers-Adam, in the Val-d'Oise département
- Villiers-au-Bouin, in the Indre-et-Loire département
- Villiers-aux-Corneilles, in the Marne département
- Villiers-Charlemagne, in the Mayenne département
- Villiers-Couture, in the Charente-Maritime département
- Villiers-en-Bière, in the Seine-et-Marne département
- Villiers-en-Bois, in the Deux-Sèvres département
- Villiers-en-Désœuvre, in the Eure département
- Villiers-en-Lieu, in the Haute-Marne département
- Villiers-en-Morvan, in the Côte-d'Or département
- Villiers-en-Plaine, in the Deux-Sèvres département
- Villiers-Fossard, in the Manche département
- Villiers-Herbisse, in the Aube département
- Villiers-la-Garenne, former community
- Villiers-le-Bâcle, in the Essonne département
- Villiers-le-Bel, in the Val-d'Oise département
- Villiers-le-Bois, in the Aube département
- Villiers-le-Duc, in the Côte-d'Or département
- Villiers-le-Mahieu, in the Yvelines département
- Villiers-le-Morhier, in the Eure-et-Loir département
- Villiers-le-Pré, in the Manche département
- Villiers-le-Roux, in the Charente département
- Villiers-lès-Aprey, in the Haute-Marne département
- Villiers-le-Sec, Calvados, in the Calvados département
- Villiers-le-Sec, Haute-Marne, in the Haute-Marne département
- Villiers-le-Sec, Nièvre, in the Nièvre département
- Villiers-le-Sec, Val-d'Oise, in the Val-d'Oise département
- Villiers-les-Hauts, in the Yonne département
- Villiers-Louis, in the Yonne département
- Villiers-Saint-Benoît, in the Yonne département
- Villiers-Saint-Denis, in the Aisne département
- Villiers-Saint-Frédéric, in the Yvelines département
- Villiers-Saint-Georges, in the Seine-et-Marne département
- Villiers-Saint-Orien, in the Eure-et-Loir département
- Villiers-sous-Grez, in the Seine-et-Marne département
- Villiers-sous-Mortagne, in the Orne département
- Villiers-sous-Praslin, in the Aube département
- Villiers-sur-Chizé, in the Deux-Sèvres département
- Villiers-sur-Loir, in the Loir-et-Cher département
- Villiers-sur-Marne, in the Val-de-Marne département
- Villiers-sur-Morin, in the Seine-et-Marne département
- Villiers-sur-Orge, in the Essonne département
- Villiers-sur-Seine, in the Seine-et-Marne département
- Villiers-sur-Suize, in the Haute-Marne département
- Villiers-sur-Tholon, in the Yonne département
- Villiers-sur-Yonne, in the Nièvre département
- Villiers-Vineux, in the Yonne département
- Villiers station, a station of the Paris Metro (lines 2 and 3)

=== Elsewhere ===
- Villiers Island, an artificial island at the north-west corner of Toronto's Port Lands
- Villiers, Ontario, Canada, a small settlement near Peterborough
- Villiers, Free State, South Africa
- Villiers, Switzerland, in the Val-de-Ruz district of the canton of Neuchâtel

== People ==
- Villiers family, British noble family
  - Villiers baronets, in the Baronetage of England
- Abraham de Villiers, French Huguenot refugee in South Africa
- AB de Villiers (born 1984), South African cricketer
- Alan Villiers (1903–1982), Australian author, adventurer, photographer and mariner
- Amherst Villiers (1900–1991), English engineer and portrait painter
- André Villiers (born 1954), French politician
- André-Jean-François-Marie Brochant de Villiers (1772–1840), French mineralogist and geologist
- Auguste Villiers de l'Isle-Adam (1838–1889), French symbolist writer
- Barbara Villiers, later Barbara Palmer, 1st Duchess of Cleveland (1640–1709), English courtesan
- Charles Villiers (disambiguation)
- Constance Villiers-Stuart (1876–1966), English author and painter
- Édouard de Villiers du Terrage (1780–1855), French engineer
- Edward Villiers (disambiguation)
- Elizabeth Villiers, later Elizabeth Hamilton, Countess of Orkney (1657–1733), English courtier
- Fanie de Villiers (born 1964), South African cricketer
- Frances Villiers, Countess of Jersey (1753–1821), English mistress of the Prince Regent
- Francis Child Villiers (1819–1862), British politician
- Francis Hyde Villiers (1852–1925), British civil servant and diplomat
- François Villiers (1920–2009), French film director
- François Hüet Villiers (1772–1813), French-born artist resident in London
- Frederic Villiers (1851–1922), British war artist and war correspondent
- Sir George Villiers (of Brokesby) (c.1544–1606), High Sheriff of Leicestershire, England, and Member of Parliament
- George Villiers (disambiguation)
- Gérard de Villiers (1929–2013), French writer, journalist and publisher
- Giniel de Villiers (born 1972), South African racing and rally driver
- Jacques Villiers (1924–2012), French aerospace engineer and public servant
- James Villiers (1933–1998), British actor
- Jean de Villiers (grand master) of the Knights Hospitaller in the 13th century
- Jean de Villiers (born 1981), South African rugby player
- John Villers (born 1485/86), English politician
- Katherine Villiers, Duchess of Buckingham (died 1649)
- Sieur Louis Coulon de Villiers (1710–1757), French Canadian military officer
- Nora Villiers (c. 1836–1871), Aboriginal Australian religious figure
- Philippe de Villiers (born 1949), French politician
- Pieter de Villiers (disambiguation)
- Priscilla de Villiers, Canadian activist
- Sarah Villiers, Countess of Jersey (1785–1867)
- Theresa Villiers (born 1968), British politician
- Victor Child Villiers, 7th Earl of Jersey (1845–1915), British banker, politician and colonial administrator
- William Villiers (disambiguation)

== Fictional characters ==
- Diana Villiers, a fictional character in the Aubrey-Maturin series by Patrick O'Brian
- Snow Villiers is a playable character in Square Enix's Final Fantasy XIII
- A character in the 1596 play Edward III, partly written by William Shakespeare
- A character in the James Bond film Casino Royale
- Anthony Villiers, the protagonist of a science-fiction series by Alexei Panshin
- A character in Arthur Machen's novella The Great God Pan
- A character in The Bourne Identity series by Robert Ludlum

== Other ==
- Battle of Villiers, a 1870 battle during the Franco-Prussian war
- Villiers Engineering, a manufacturer of bicycle and motorcycle parts
- Villiers School, in Limerick, Ireland

== See also ==
- De Villiers, a surname
- Villers (disambiguation)
