= Allibaudières =

Commune in Grand Est, France

- Commune
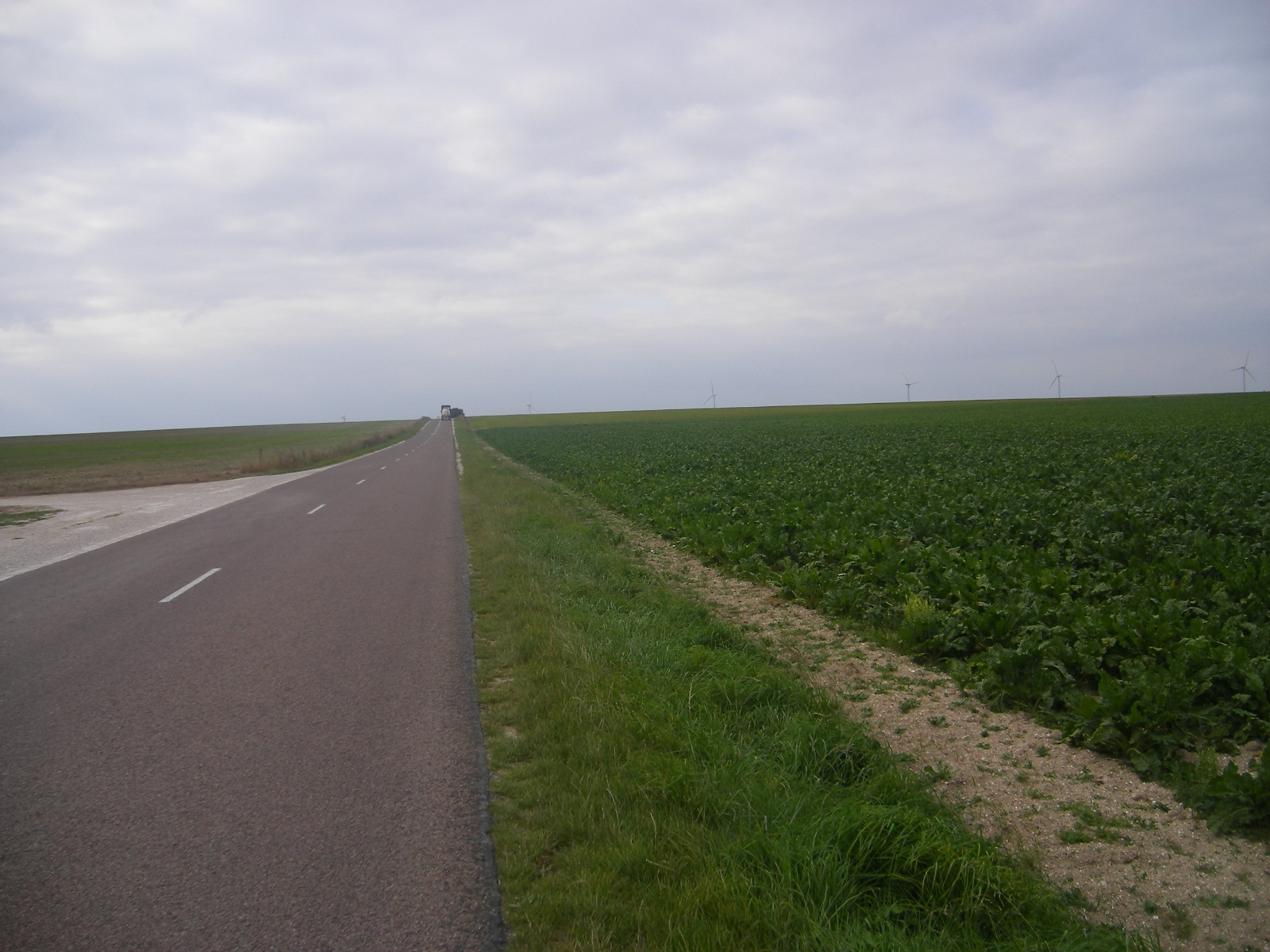
- Landscape between Allibaudières and Salon
- Location of Allibaudières
- Location within France Location within Grand Est
- Coordinates: 48°35′07″N 4°06′37″E
- Country: France
- Region: Grand Est
- Department: Aube
- Arrondissement: Troyes
- Canton: Arcis-sur-Aube
- Intercommunality: Arcis, Mailly, Ramerupt

Government
  - Mayor (2020–2026): Bruno Meunier
- Area^{1}: 24.13 km^{2} (9.32 sq mi)
- Elevation: 96 m (315 ft)
- Highest elevation: 166 m (545 ft)
- Lowest elevation: 88 m (289 ft)
- Population (2023): 208
  - Density: 8.62/km^{2} (22.3/sq mi)
- Time zone: UTC+01:00 (CET)
  - Summer (DST): UTC+02:00 (CEST)
- INSEE/Postal code: 10004 /10700
- ^{1} French Land Register data, which excludes lakes, ponds, glaciers > 1 km^{2} (0.386 sq mi or 247 acres) and river estuaries.

Allibaudières (French pronunciation: [alibodjɛʁ]) is a commune in the Aube department in the Grand Est region of north-central France.

== Geography ==
Allibaudières is located some 5 km north-west of Arcis-sur-Aube and 10 km south of Mailly-le-Camp. Access to the commune is by the D10 road from Arcis-sur-Aube in the south-east passing through the village and continuing north to Herbisse. The D71 road goes from the village north-west to Salon. The D137 also goes east from the village to join the D9 south of Trouans. The D677 from Arcis-sur-Aube passes from south to north through the eastern part of the commune continuing to Mailly-le-Camp. The A26 autoroute just touches the eastern border of the commune but there is no exit near.

L'Herbissonne river flows from north to south through the commune and the village joining the Aube near Champigny-sur-Aube. Apart from a strip of forest following the river the commune consists entirely of farmland.

== Administration ==
List of Successive Mayors

From	To	Name
1857	?	Bourgin
1887	?	Casimir Grenon
2001	2008	Arlette Mackowicz
2008		Bruno Meunier
2014	2020	Gilbert Beell
2020	Incumbent	Bruno Meunier

== Population ==
The inhabitants of the commune are known as Allibaudiérats or Allibaudiérates in French.

Historical population
Year	Pop.	±% p.a.
1968	233	—
1975	221	−0.75%
1982	241	+1.25%
1990	244	+0.15%
1999	269	+1.09%
2007	255	−0.67%
2012	261	+0.47%
2017	209	−4.35%
2023	208	−0.08%
Source: INSEE

== Sites and Monuments ==
- The Church (15th century) is registered as an historical monument.
- The Parish Church of the Five wounds of Christ was built from 1956 to 1958 by Michel Grandnom. It replaced a church that suffered bombing in 1940. There is a unique vessel made of stone and wood. The building contains many items that are registered as historical objects:
- A Statue: Saint Sebastian (17th century)
- A Statue: Saint Antoine (16th century)
- An Haut-relief: Christ and the Deadly Sins (16th century)
- A Statue: Saint Nicodème (16th century)
- 2 Statues: Saint John and the Virgin (16th century)
- An Haut-relief: The hunt of Saint Hubert (16th century)
- A Statue: Saint Marguerite (destroyed) (16th century)
- A Baptismal font (destroyed) (16th century)
- A Statue: Virgin and child (15th century)
- A Cemetery Cross (1808)
- A Paten (19th century)
- A Chalice (19th century)
- A Ciborium (19th century)
- A Ciborium (19th century)
- A Chalice with Paten (19th century)
- A Statue: Saint Tanche (disappeared) (18th century)
- A Statue: Saint Nicolas (disappeared) (18th century)
- A Group Sculpture: Virgin of Pity (16th century)
- A Statue: Christ (16th century)
- The Furniture in the church

== See also ==
- Communes of the Aube department
- Cantons of the Aube department
- Arrondissements of the Aube department
