= Villers =

Villers may refer to:

== Places ==
=== In France ===
- Villers, Loire, in the Loire département
- Villers, Vosges, in the Vosges département
- Villers-Agron-Aiguizy, in the Aisne département
- Villers-Allerand, in the Marne département
- Villers-au-Bois, in the Pas-de-Calais département
- Villers-au-Flos, in the Pas-de-Calais département
- Villers-au-Tertre, in the Nord département
- Villers-aux-Bois, in the Marne département
- Villers-aux-Érables, in the Somme département
- Villers-aux-Nœuds, in the Marne département
- Villers-aux-Vents, in the Meuse département
- Villers-Bocage, Calvados, in the Calvados département
- Villers-Bocage, Somme, in the Somme département
- Villers-Bouton, in the Haute-Saône département
- Villers-Bretonneux, in the Somme département
- Villers-Brûlin, in the Pas-de-Calais département
- Villers-Buzon, in the Doubs département
- Villers-Campsart, in the Somme département
- Villers-Canivet, in the Calvados département
- Villers-Carbonnel, in the Somme département
- Villers-Cernay, in the Ardennes département
- Villers-Châtel, in the Pas-de-Calais département
- Villers-Chemin-et-Mont-lès-Étrelles, in the Haute-Saône département
- Villers-Chief, in the Doubs département
- Villers-Cotterêts, in the Aisne département
- Villers-devant-Dun, in the Meuse département
- Villers-devant-le-Thour, in the Ardennes département
- Villers-devant-Mouzon, in the Ardennes département
- Villers-Écalles, in the Seine-Maritime département
- Villers-en-Argonne, in the Marne département
- Villers-en-Arthies, in the Val-d'Oise département
- Villers-en-Cauchies, in the Nord département
- Villers-en-Haye, in the Meurthe-et-Moselle département
- Villers-en-Ouche, in the Orne département
- Villers-en-Prayères, in the Aisne département
- Villers-en-Vexin, in the Eure département
- Villers-Farlay, in the Jura département
- Villers-Faucon, in the Somme département
- Villers-Franqueux, in the Marne département
- Villers-Grélot, in the Doubs département
- Villers-Guislain, in the Nord département
- Villers-Hélon, in the Aisne département
- Villers-la-Chèvre, in the Meurthe-et-Moselle département
- Villers-la-Combe, in the Doubs département
- Villers-la-Faye, in the Côte-d'Or département
- Villers-la-Montagne, in the Meurthe-et-Moselle département
- Villers-la-Ville, Haute-Saône, in the Haute-Saône département
- Villers-le-Château, in the Marne département
- Villers-le-Lac, in the Doubs département
- Villers-le-Rond, in the Meurthe-et-Moselle département
- Villers-les-Bois, in the Jura département
- Villers-lès-Cagnicourt, in the Pas-de-Calais département
- Villers-le-Sec, Aisne, in the Aisne département
- Villers-le-Sec, Marne, in the Marne département
- Villers-le-Sec, Meuse, in the Meuse département
- Villers-le-Sec, Haute-Saône, in the Haute-Saône département
- Villers-lès-Guise, in the Aisne département
- Villers-lès-Luxeuil, in the Haute-Saône département
- Villers-lès-Mangiennes, in the Meuse département
- Villers-lès-Moivrons, in the Meurthe-et-Moselle département
- Villers-lès-Nancy, in the Meurthe-et-Moselle département
- Villers-les-Ormes, in the Indre département
- Villers-les-Pots, in the Côte-d'Or département
- Villers-lès-Roye, in the Somme département
- Villers-le-Tilleul, in the Ardennes département
- Villers-le-Tourneur, in the Ardennes département
- Villers-l'Hôpital, in the Pas-de-Calais département
- Villers-Marmery, in the Marne département
- Villers-Outréaux, in the Nord département
- Villers-Pater, in the Haute-Saône département
- Villers-Patras, in the Côte-d'Or département
- Villers-Plouich, in the Nord département
- Villers-Pol, in the Nord département
- Villers-Robert, in the Jura département
- Villers-Rotin, in the Côte-d'Or département
- Villers-Saint-Barthélemy, in the Oise département
- Villers-Saint-Christophe, in the Aisne département
- Villers-Saint-Frambourg, in the Oise département
- Villers-Saint-Genest, in the Oise département
- Villers-Saint-Martin, in the Doubs département
- Villers-Saint-Paul, in the Oise département
- Villers-Saint-Sépulcre, in the Oise département
- Villers-Semeuse, in the Ardennes département
- Villers-Sire-Nicole, in the Nord département
- Villers-Sir-Simon, in the Pas-de-Calais département
- Villers-sous-Ailly, in the Somme département
- Villers-sous-Chalamont, in the Doubs département
- Villers-sous-Châtillon, in the Marne département
- Villers-sous-Foucarmont, in the Seine-Maritime département
- Villers-sous-Montrond, in the Doubs département
- Villers-sous-Pareid, in the Meuse département
- Villers-sous-Prény, in the Meurthe-et-Moselle département
- Villers-sous-Saint-Leu, in the Oise département
- Villers-Stoncourt, in the Moselle département
- Villers-sur-Auchy, in the Oise département
- Villers-sur-Authie, in the Somme département
- Villers-sur-Bar, in the Ardennes département
- Villers-sur-Bonnières, in the Oise département
- Villers-sur-Coudun, in the Oise département
- Villers-sur-Fère, in the Aisne département
- Villers-sur-le-Mont, in the Ardennes département
- Villers-sur-le-Roule, in the Eure département
- Villers-sur-Mer, in the Calvados département
- Villers-sur-Meuse, in the Meuse département
- Villers-sur-Nied, in the Moselle département
- Villers-sur-Port, in the Haute-Saône département
- Villers-sur-Saulnot, in the Haute-Saône département
- Villers-sur-Trie, in the Oise département
- Villers-Tournelle, in the Somme département
- Villers-Vaudey, in the Haute-Saône département
- Villers-Vermont, in the Oise département
- Villers-Vicomte, in the Oise département

=== In Belgium ===
- Villers-la-Ville, a municipality of Walloon Brabant
- Villers-Sainte-Gertrude, a village in the province of Luxembourg

== People ==
- André Villers (1930–2016), French photographer and artist
- Charles de Villers (1765–1815), French philosopher
- Charles Joseph de Villers (1724–1810), French naturalist
- Charles de Villers (1765–1815), French philosopher
- Marie-Denise Villers (1774–1821), French painter
- Sir John Villers (1485/6–1544), English politician
- Philippe Villers, French-American entrepreneur
- Raido Villers (born 1982), Estonian professional basketballer

== See also ==
- Villiers (disambiguation)
