= Aubette =

Aubette may refer to:

- Aubette (building)

French rivers:

- Aubette (Seine-Maritime)
- Aubette de Meulan
- Aubette de Magny
- Aubette (Aube)
