= Herbissonne =

- Location within France Location within Grand Est

Location
- Country: France

Physical characteristics
- Source
  - location: Champagne crayeuse
- Mouth
  - location: Aube
  - coordinates: 48.5555°N 4.0602°E
- Length: 14.4 km (8.9 mi)

Basin features
- Progression: Aube→ Seine→ English Channel

The Herbissonne is a small stream in the Aube department in the Grand Est region of north-eastern France. It is 14.4 km (8.9 mi) long. It flows into the river Aube near Champigny-sur-Aube.

== Geography ==
The Herbissonne starts in the village of Villiers-Herbisse and flows into the river Aube after crossing the villages of Herbisse, Allibaudières and finally Champigny-sur-Aube.
