= Villiers-Herbisse =

Commune in Grand Est, France

- Commune
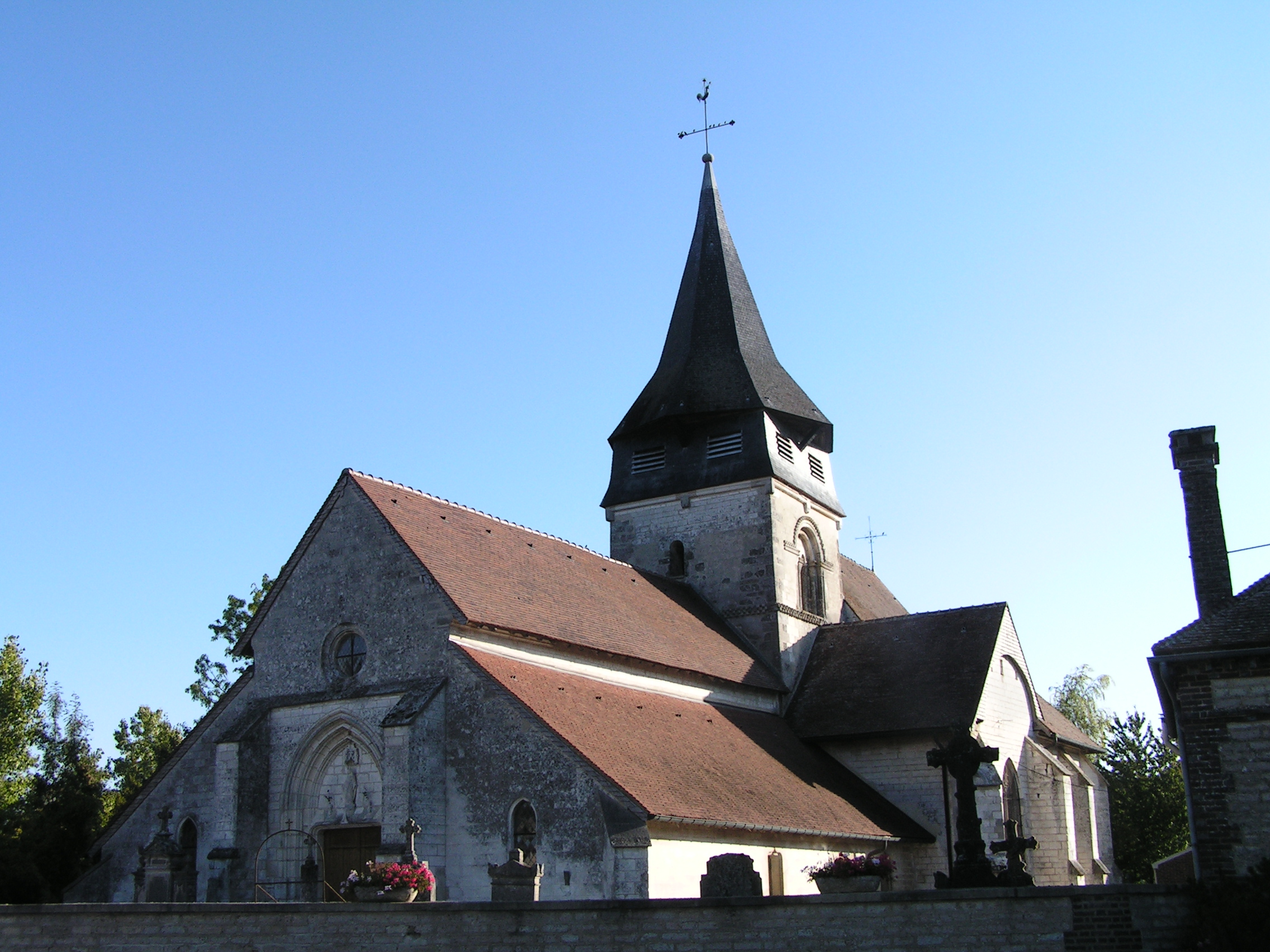
- The church in Villiers-Herbisse
- Location of Villiers-Herbisse
- Location within France Location within Grand Est
- Coordinates: 48°38′12″N 4°06′46″E
- Country: France
- Region: Grand Est
- Department: Aube
- Arrondissement: Troyes
- Canton: Arcis-sur-Aube

Government
  - Mayor (2020–2026): René Lepage
- Area^{1}: 26.44 km^{2} (10.21 sq mi)
- Elevation: 110 m (360 ft)
- Population (2023): 81
  - Density: 3.1/km^{2} (7.9/sq mi)
- Time zone: UTC+01:00 (CET)
  - Summer (DST): UTC+02:00 (CEST)
- INSEE/Postal code: 10430 /10700
- ^{1} French Land Register data, which excludes lakes, ponds, glaciers > 1 km^{2} (0.386 sq mi or 247 acres) and river estuaries.

Villiers-Herbisse (French pronunciation: [vilje ɛʁbis]) is a commune in the Aube department in north-central France.

== Population ==
Historical population
Year	Pop.	±% p.a.
1968	106	—
1975	89	−2.47%
1982	73	−2.79%
1990	88	+2.36%
1999	90	+0.25%
2007	97	+0.94%
2012	88	−1.93%
2017	87	−0.23%
2023	81	−1.18%
Source: INSEE

== Geography ==
Villiers-Herbisse is located at the intersection of the Route Départementale 10 and the Route Départementale 198. North is the village of Semoine and south the village of Herbisse. The Herbissonne, a small stream 14 km (8.7 mi) long, ends in the Aube and has its origin in Villiers-Herbisse.

Local resources and productions are related to agriculture, mainly grain and intensive agriculture.

== History ==
The village is called Villiers-sur-Herbisse until the 18th century when it becomes Villiers-Herbisse. Louis de Clermont d'Amboise, marquis de Reynel, died there on 3 November 1615 after a memorable military charge.

== Monuments ==
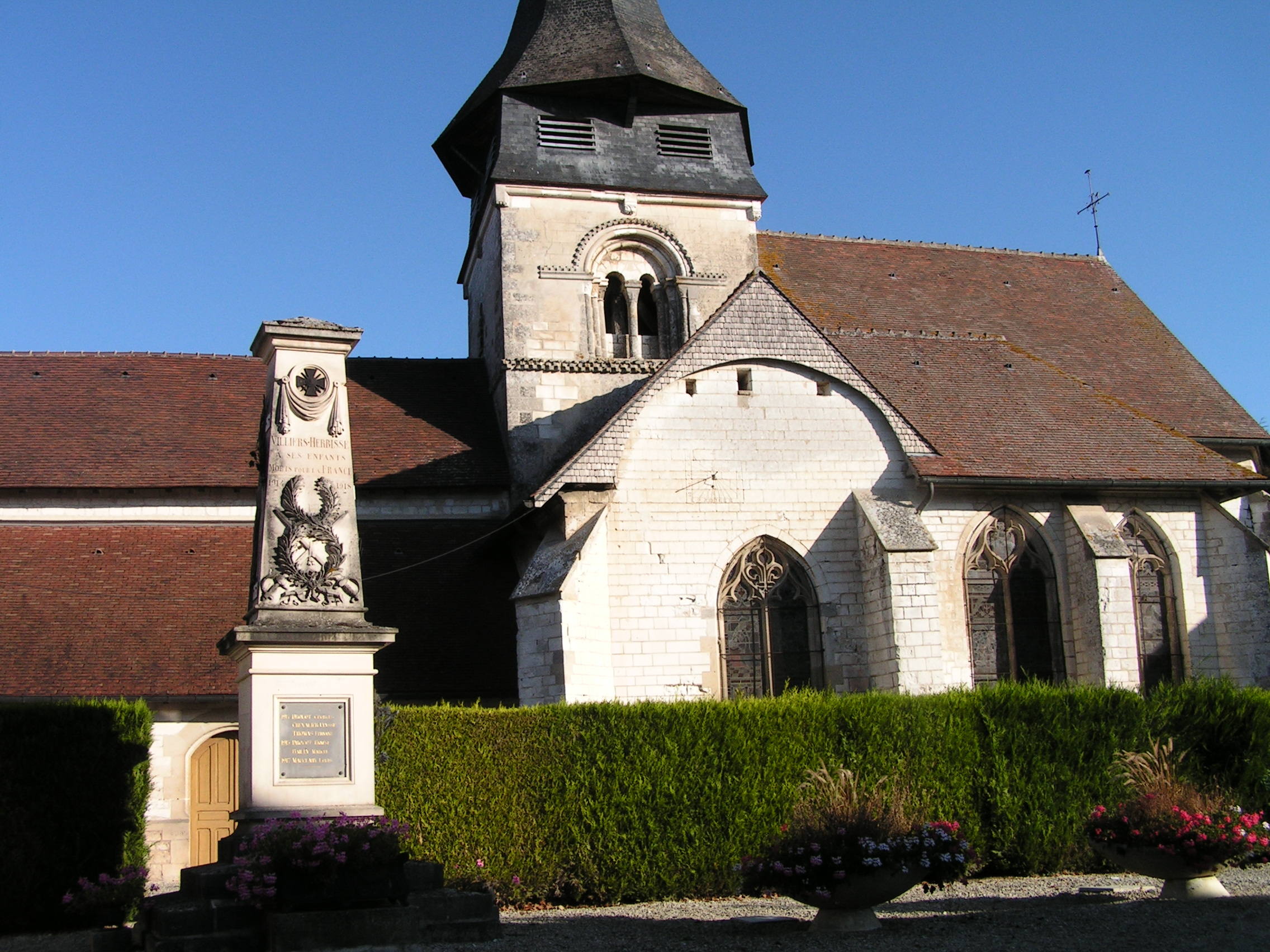
Villiers Herbisses: the Church and the Monuments to the village soldiers who died for their country

On the right side of the Herbissonne, surrounded by the cemetery, the Catholic church of the Assumption is a religious building registered as a Historic Monument since 15 April 1958.

The old Café Richomme, built in 1911 on the Rue de la Crayère on the left side, close to the church, the townhall and the old elementary school.

Six windmills at the border with Salon and Champfleury, the tallest being 121 m (397 ft) high.

== See also ==
- Communes of the Aube department
