= Victor of Arcis =

Saint Victor of Arcis
- Born: Troyes, Champagne, France
- Residence: Arcis-sur-Aube, Aube, France
- Died: 7th century Saturniac (modern Saint-Vittre), diocese of Troyes
- Feast: 26 February

Saint Victor of Arcis (Vittre, Vitre, Victor the Hermit; f. 7th century) was a 6th- or 7th-century hermit and then monk in Champagne, France, known from the writings in his honor by Saint Bernard. His feast day is 26 February.

== Monks of Ramsgate account ==
The monks of St Augustine's Abbey, Ramsgate wrote in their Book of Saints (1921),

Victor (St.) (Feb. 26)
(7th century, probably.) A holy hermit and priest who passed his life in penance and prayer in a solitary place in the Province of Champagne in France. He owes his celebrity in great part to the noble Panegyrics and Hymns composed in his honour by Saint Bernard.

== Butler's account ==
The hagiographer Alban Butler (1710–1773) wrote in his Lives of the Fathers, Martyrs, and Other Principal Saints under February 26,

Saint Victor, or Vittre, of Arcies, or Arcis, in Champagne, Anchoret and Confessor

In the Seventh Age.

He was of noble parentage in the diocess of Troyes in Champagne, educated under strict discipline in learning and piety, and a saint from his cradle. In his youth, prayer, fasting and alms-deeds were his chief delight, and, embracing an ecclesiastical state, he took orders; but the love of heavenly contemplation being always the prevalent inclination in his soul, he preferred close retirement to the mixed life of the care of souls. In this choice the Holy Ghost was his director, for he lived in continual union with God by prayer and contemplation, and seemed raised above the condition of this mortal life, and almost as if he lived without a body. God glorified him by many miracles; but the greatest seems to have been the powerful example of his life.

We have two pious panegyrics made upon this saint by St. Bernard, who says: “Now placed in heaven, he beholds God clearly revealed to him, swallowed up in joy, but not forgetting us. It is not a land of oblivion in which Victor dwells. Heaven doth not harden or straiten hearts, but it maketh them more tender and compassionate; it doth not distract minds, nor alienate them from us; it doth not diminish, but it increaseth affection and charity: it augmenteth bowels of piety. The angels, although they behold the face of their Father, visit, run, and continually assist us; and shall they now forget us who were once among us, and who once suffered themselves what they see us at present labouring under? No: I know the just expect me till thou renderest to me my reward. Victor is not like that cup-bearer of Pharaoh, who could forget his fellow-captive. He hath not so put on the stole of glory himself, as to lay aside his pity, or the remembrance of our misery.”

St. Victor died at Saturniac, now called Saint-Vittre, two leagues from Arcies in the diocess of Troyes. A church was built over his tomb at Saturniac; but in 837 his relics were translated thence to the neighbouring monastery of Montier-Ramey, or Montirame, so called from Arremar, by whom it was founded in 837. It is situated four leagues from Troyes, of the Benedictin Order, and is still possessed of this sacred treasure. At the request of these monks, St. Bernard composed an office of St. Victor, extant in his works, (ep. 312. vet. ed. seu 398. nov. edit.) See the two sermons of St. Bernard on Saint Victor, and his ancient life in Henschenius and others: from which it appears that this saint never was a monk, never having professed any monastic Order, though he led an eremitical life.

== Ranbeck's account ==
Ægidius Ranbeck (1608–1692) wrote in his Heiliges Benedictiner-Jahr (Saints of the Order of Saint Benedict; 1677),,

Saint Victor, Hermit and Monk

While yet in the womb, Saint Victor was so great a terror to the Evil One, that the mere presence of his mother cast out devils from those who were possessed. Our Saint’s parents took care that, after being cleansed in the purifying waters of Baptism, the child, whom the Almighty chose to glorify with such power, should have the most thorough training in virtue and piety. From his father’s house the youth proceeded straight to a desert, and in a small cell, rudely made of interwoven branches, he for some years led a hermit’s life, mortifying the flesh with hunger, thirst, and watching. Rain water, drawn from the pools where it had lodged, was the only drink with which he slaked his thirst. One summer the neighbourhood in which the hermit lived was afflicted by a long-continued drought; all the pools were dried up; there was not a spring or a stream within miles; not a drop of water was to be had unless by journeying to the nearest village or town. As Victor was unwilling to abandon the solitary life to which he had bound himself, he, after being tortured for several days by all the pangs of thirst, at last implored help from Heaven. In answer to his prayers a spring gushed forth from the arid soil, and though in appearance like water, it surpassed in taste the mellowest wine.

After the arrival of Saint Maurus in Gaul, several monasteries in that country voluntarily received the Rule of Saint Benedict, and many anchorites also exchanged the hermit’s cell for the monastic state. So Saint Victor, in order to qualify himself in every respect for Heaven, joined the Monastery of Arremonense. It was wonderful how the new monk distinguished himself in brotherly love, charity, patience, and obedience – virtues which are the chief supports of community life. Nor did he neglect the watchings, the long fasts, the bodily mortifications, the perpetual silence of his hermit days. So severe was Saint Victor’s discipline, so purified was he from all earthly weakness, so much did he raise himself above the condition of this mortal life, that he was deemed worthy to be allowed to gaze on the joys of Heaven. In such pious practices, and cheered by such dazzling visions, our Saint grew old, till it pleased Almighty God to summon him to participate in those delights which he had so often been permitted to witness. His body was buried in the monastery which sheltered him after leaving the desert, and numerous miracles were wrought at his tomb.

Most writers place the death of this Saint in the sixth century after Christ.

== Sources ==
- Butler, Alban (1866), The Lives of the Fathers, Martyrs, and Other Principal Saints, vol. 2, James Duffy This article incorporates text from this source, which is in the public domain.
- Ranbeck, Father Aegedius, O.S.B. (1896), Father J. Alphonsus Morrall, O.S.B. (ed.), Saints of the Order of Saint Benedict, vol. January/February/March, translated by J P Molohan, M.A., Translated from the 1677 Latin edition published in Augsburg Monastery, England This article incorporates text from this source, which is in the public domain.
- St. Augustine's Abbey, Ramsgate (1921), The Book of saints : a dictionary of servants of God canonized by the Catholic Church, London: A. & C. Black, ltd. This article incorporates text from this source, which is in the public domain.
