= Charles Villiers =

Charles Villiers may refer to:

- Charles Pelham Villiers (1802–1898), British lawyer and politician
- Charles Villiers (actor) (1884–1940), Australian actor and director
- Charles Hyde Villiers (1912–1992), British businessman and chairman of British Steel
- Charles de Villiers (born 1953), South African chess player

== See also ==
- Villiers (disambiguation)
