= George Child Villiers =

George Child Villiers may refer to:

- George Child Villiers, 5th Earl of Jersey (1773–1859), British Conservative politician, Lord Chamberlain of the Household, Master of the Horse
- George Child Villiers, 6th Earl of Jersey (1808–1859), English peer, Member of Parliament for Rochester, Minehead, Honiton, Weymouth & Melcome Regis, Cirencester
- George Child Villiers, 8th Earl of Jersey (1873–1923), English peer, Lord-in-Waiting
- George Child Villiers, 9th Earl of Jersey (1910–1998), English peer
- George Child Villiers, Viscount Villiers (1948–1998), son of the 9th Earl of Jersey
- William Child Villiers, 10th Earl of Jersey (born George Francis William Child Villiers, 1976), British actor, writer, producer

== See also ==
- George Villiers (disambiguation)
