= Edward Villiers =

Edward Villiers may refer to:

- Edward Villiers (Master of the Mint) (ca. 1585–1626), English political figure, highest officer of the Royal Mint; half-brother to George Villiers, 1st Duke of Buckingham
- Edward Villiers (1620–1689), member of English noble family; fourth son of Edward Villiers, Master of the Mint
- Edward Villiers, 1st Earl of Jersey (1656–1711), English courtier, diplomat and Lord Justice; son of Edward Villiers (1620–1689)
- Edward Villiers, 5th Earl of Clarendon (1846–1914), English political figure, son of George Villiers, 4th Earl of Clarendon (1800–1870); House of Lords (1870–1914)

== See also ==
- Villiers
