= Auberive =

- Commune
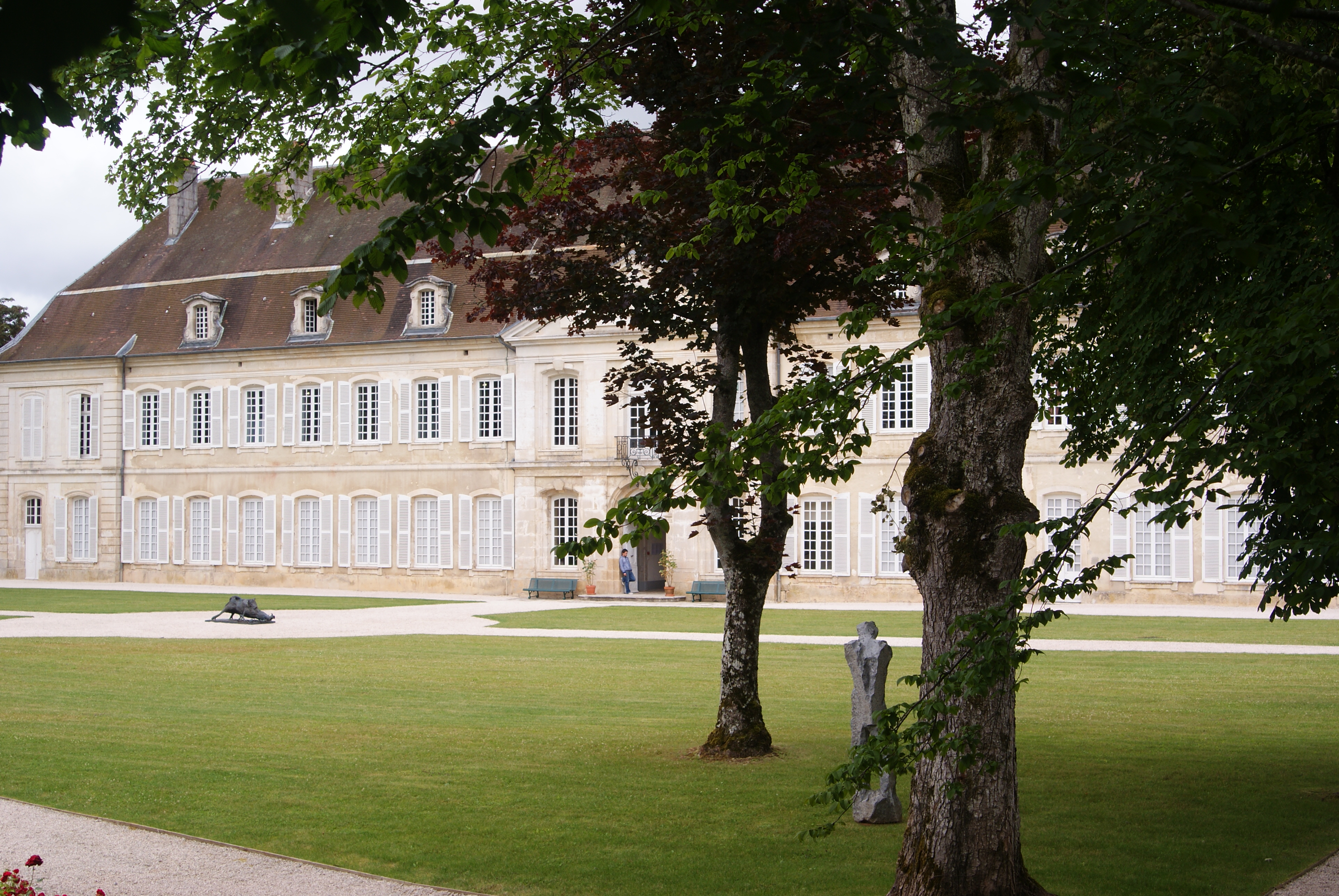
- Château d'Auberive

- Coat of arms
- Location of Auberive
- Location within France Location within Grand Est
- Coordinates: 47°47′16″N 5°03′46″E
- Country: France
- Region: Grand Est
- Department: Haute-Marne
- Arrondissement: Langres
- Canton: Villegusien-le-Lac
- Intercommunality: CC Auberive Vingeanne Montsaugeonnais

Government
  - Mayor (2020–2026): Jean-Claude Volot
- Area^{1}: 70.64 km^{2} (27.27 sq mi)
- Elevation: 365 m (1,198 ft)
- Highest elevation: 504 m (1,654 ft)
- Lowest elevation: 325 m (1,066 ft)
- Population (2023): 166
  - Density: 2.35/km^{2} (6.09/sq mi)
- Time zone: UTC+01:00 (CET)
  - Summer (DST): UTC+02:00 (CEST)
- INSEE/Postal code: 52023 /52160
- ^{1} French Land Register data, which excludes lakes, ponds, glaciers > 1 km^{2} (0.386 sq mi or 247 acres) and river estuaries.

Auberive (French pronunciation: [obʁiv]) is a commune in the Haute-Marne department in the Grand Est region in northeastern France.

== Geography ==
The Aujon flows west through the northeastern part of the commune. The Aube forms part of the commune's southern border, then flows northwest through the western part of the commune, where it crosses the village.

== Population ==
Historical population
Year	Pop.	±% p.a.
1968	302	—
1975	270	−1.59%
1982	219	−2.95%
1990	233	+0.78%
1999	205	−1.41%
2007	194	−0.69%
2012	191	−0.31%
2017	169	−2.42%
2023	166	−0.30%
Source: INSEE

== Images ==
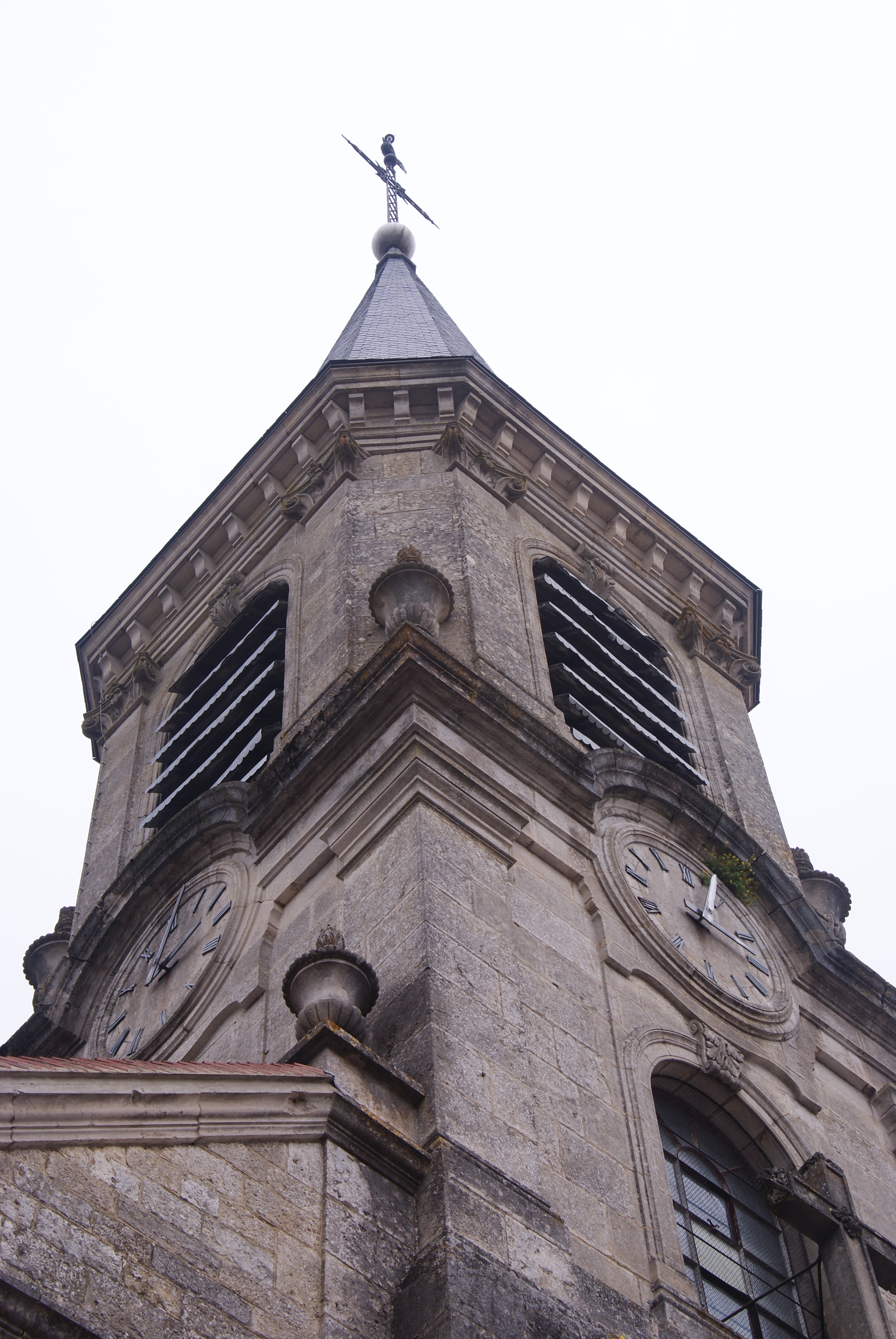
Church

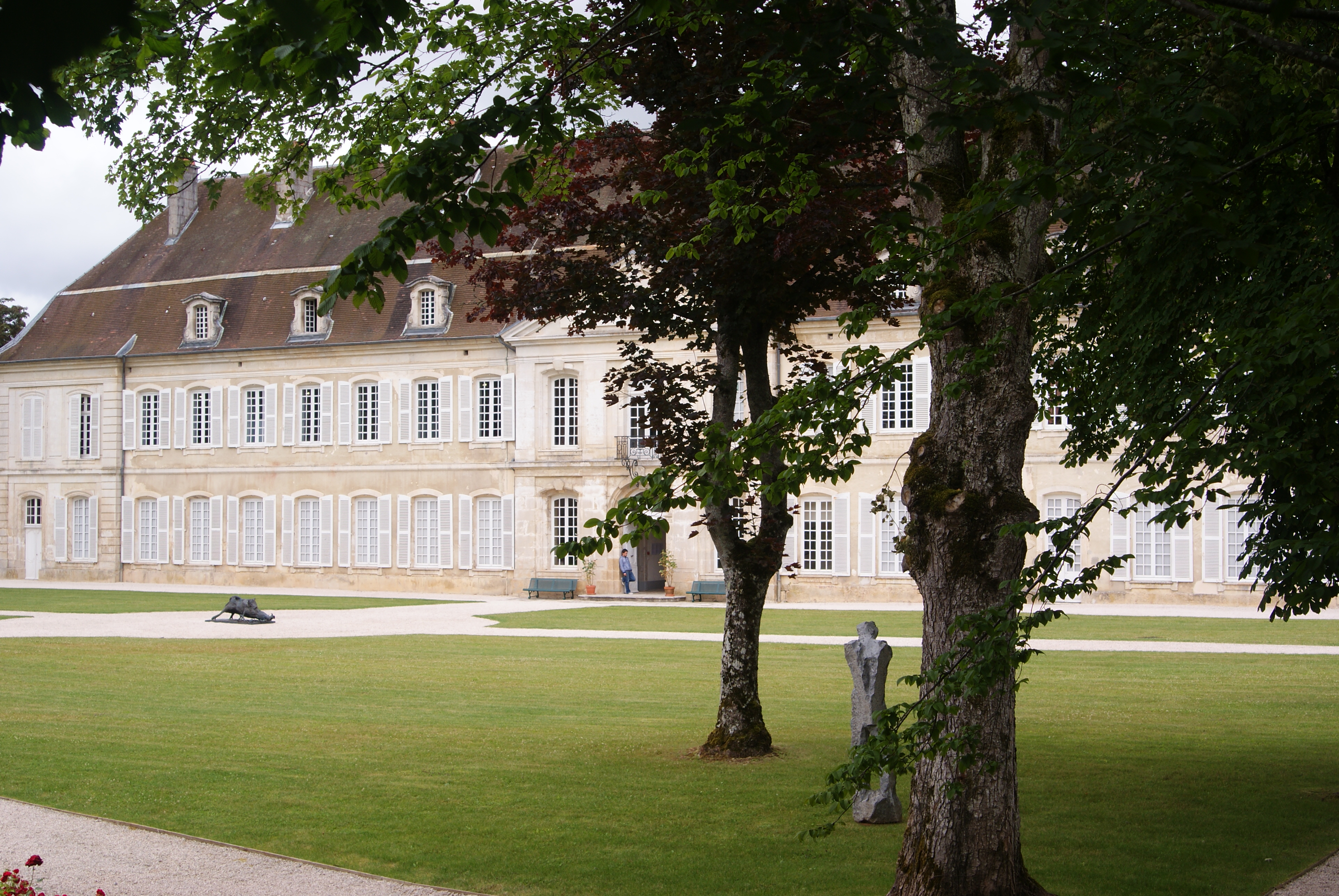
Chateau Auberive

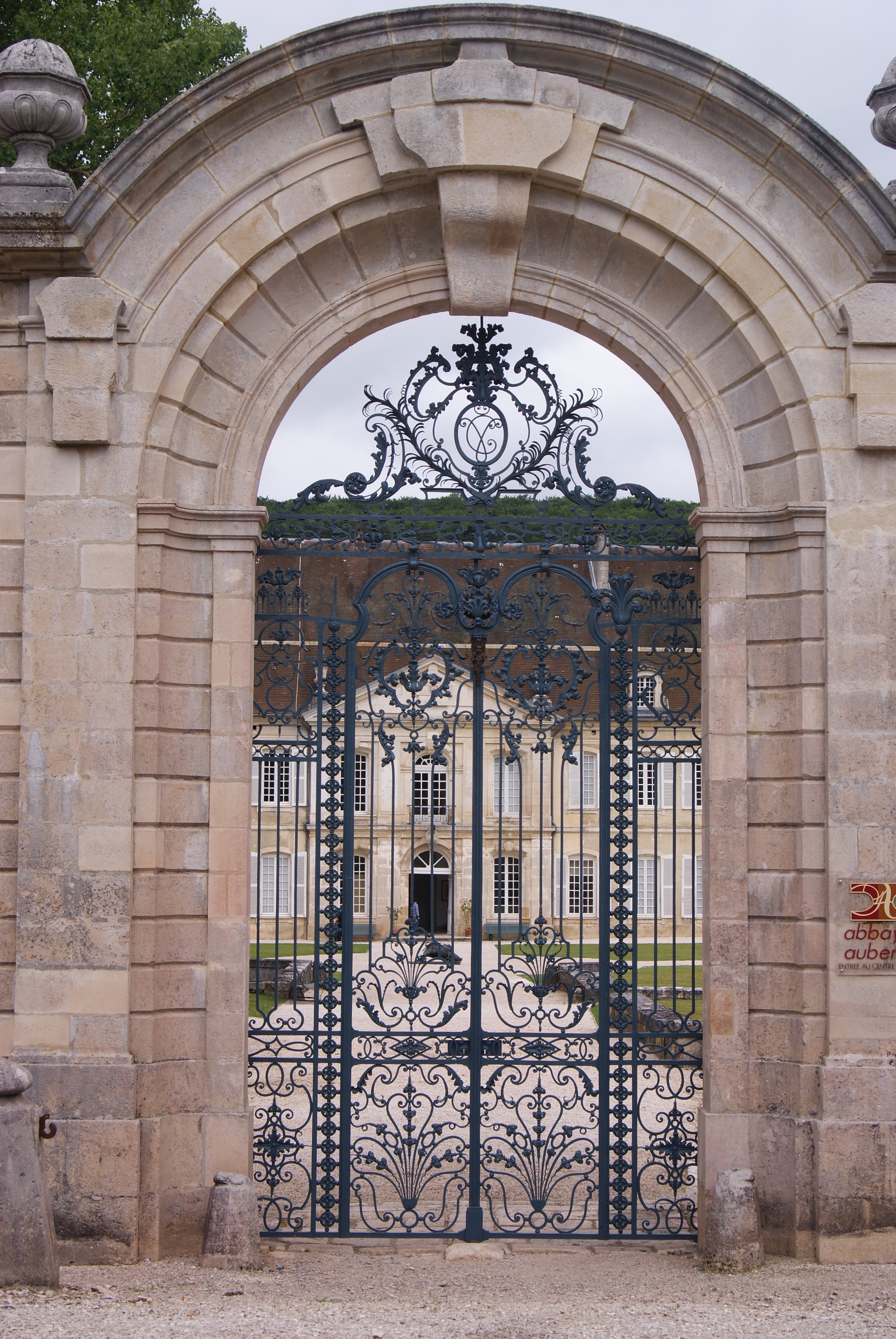
Gate to the Chateau

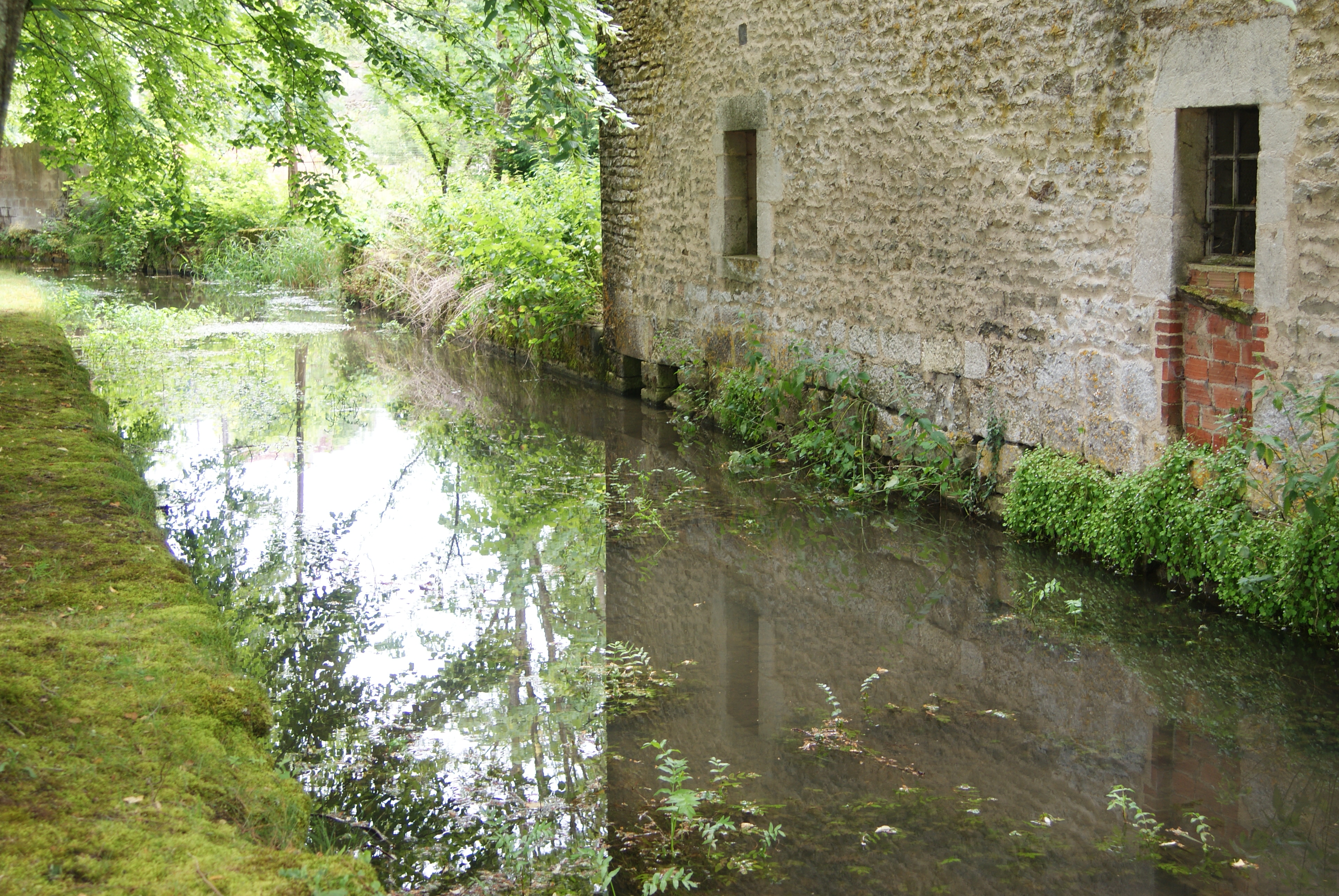
River Aube

== See also ==
- Communes of the Haute-Marne department
