= Arcis-sur-Aube =

Commune in Grand Est, France

- Commune
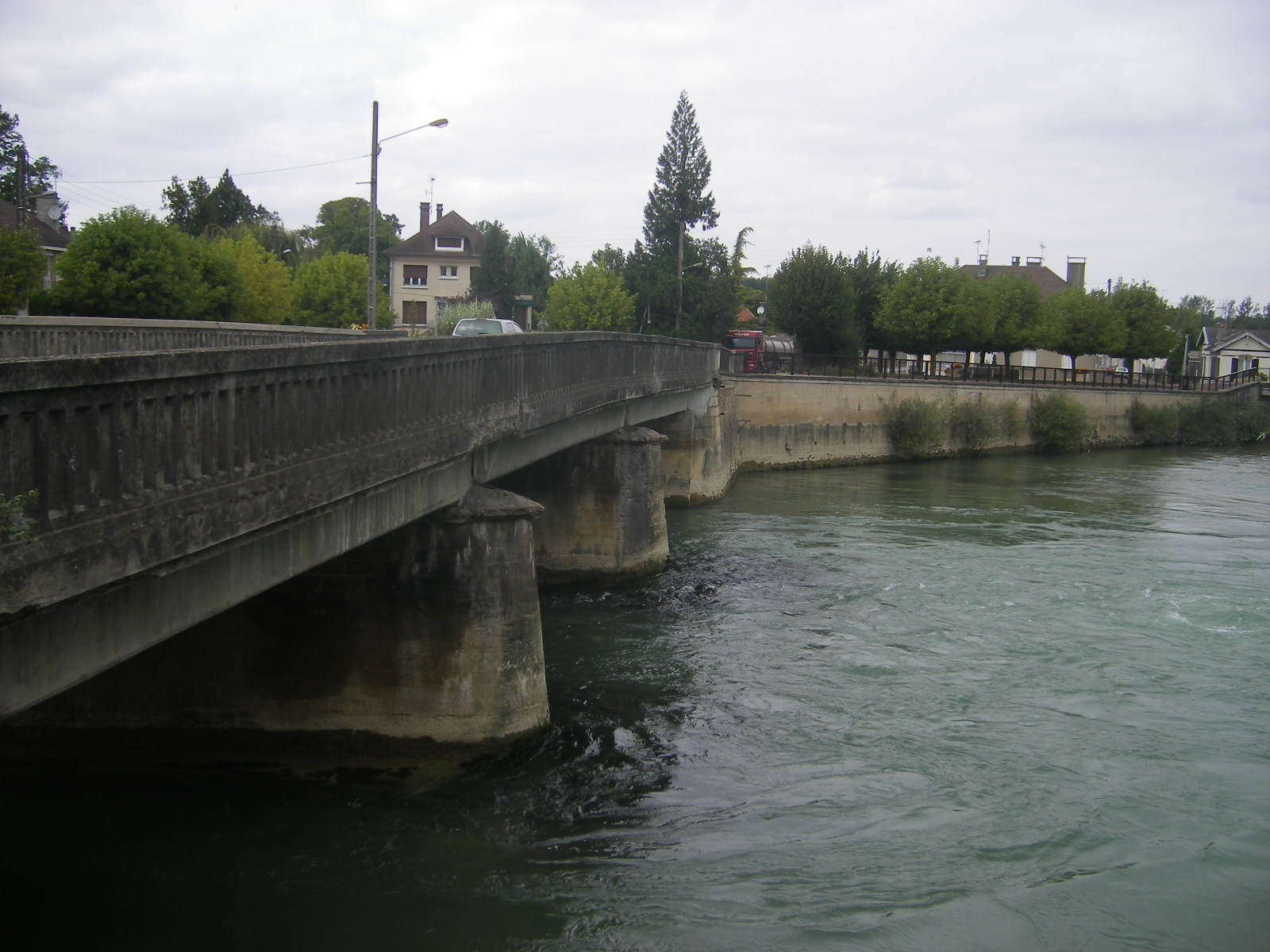
- Bridge over the Aube at Arcis-sur-Aube

- Coat of arms
- Location of Arcis-sur-Aube
- Location within France Location within Grand Est
- Coordinates: 48°32′11″N 04°08′31″E
- Country: France
- Region: Grand Est
- Department: Aube
- Arrondissement: Troyes
- Canton: Arcis-sur-Aube
- Intercommunality: Arcis, Mailly, Ramerupt

Government
  - Mayor (2026–32): Charles Hittler
- Area^{1}: 9.49 km^{2} (3.66 sq mi)
- Elevation: 92 m (302 ft)
- Highest elevation: 124 m (407 ft)
- Lowest elevation: 85 m (279 ft)
- Population (2023): 2,785
  - Density: 293/km^{2} (760/sq mi)
- Time zone: UTC+01:00 (CET)
  - Summer (DST): UTC+02:00 (CEST)
- INSEE/Postal code: 10006 /10700
- ^{1} French Land Register data, which excludes lakes, ponds, glaciers > 1 km^{2} (0.386 sq mi or 247 acres) and river estuaries.

Arcis-sur-Aube (French pronunciation: [aʁsi syʁ ob], literally Arcis on Aube), commonly known as Arcis, is a commune in the Aube department in the Grand Est region of north-central France.

The commune has been awarded "three flowers" by the National Council of Towns and Villages in Bloom in the Competition of cities and villages in Bloom.

== Geography ==
Arcis-sur-Aube is located some 27 km north of Troyes and 40 km east of Romilly-sur-Seine. Access to the commune is by the D441 road from Villette-sur-Aube in the west passing through the commune and the town and continuing to Vaupoisson. The D677 also comes from Mailly-le-Camp in the north intersecting the D441 in the town and continuing south to Voué. The D31 also goes south-west from the town to Les Grandes-Chapelles. The D10 road comes from Allibaudières in the north-west and passes through the north-west of the commune joining the D441 west of the town. A railway passes through the west of the commune from north to south with a station west of the town. The Aube river marks the northern boundary of the town flowing west but the commune covers both left and right banks of the river. The D677 passes over the river on a bridge.

The right bank and a small portion of the left bank of the Aube consists of forest and farmland. The urban area of the town extends south from the left bank and occupies about a quarter of the land area. The south of the commune is entirely farmland.

=== Transport access ===
Road access

- By motorway: the A26 autoroute, exit No. 21 (Valley of Dawn).
- By county roads:
  - D677 between Troyes and Mailly-le-Camp.
  - D31 between Nozay and Arcis-sur-Aube.
  - D441 between Méry-sur-Seine and Molins-sur-Aube.
  - D10 between Allibaudières and Arcis-sur-Aube.
  - D56 between Ormes and Arcis-sur-Aube.

Public transport

- Coach:
  - Regular route No. 7: Troyes (bus station) ⇒ ⇒ Arcis Mailly and vice versa. The stop is located in front of the hall (schedules available on the Procars website). Route 7 is operated by the company Procars Champagne and managed by the General Council of Aube.
  - Regular route No. 5: TransChampagneArdenne Troyes ⇒ Chalons-en-Champagne ⇒ Reims ⇒ Charleville-Mézières and vice versa. The stop is located at Rue de Chalons (schedules available on the Stdmarne website). Route 5 is operated by the Departmental Transportation Services of the Marne.
- Train:
  - Troyes station, taxis available in the station square.
- Air:
  - Aerodrome Troyes Barberey
  - Chalons Vatry Airport

== History ==
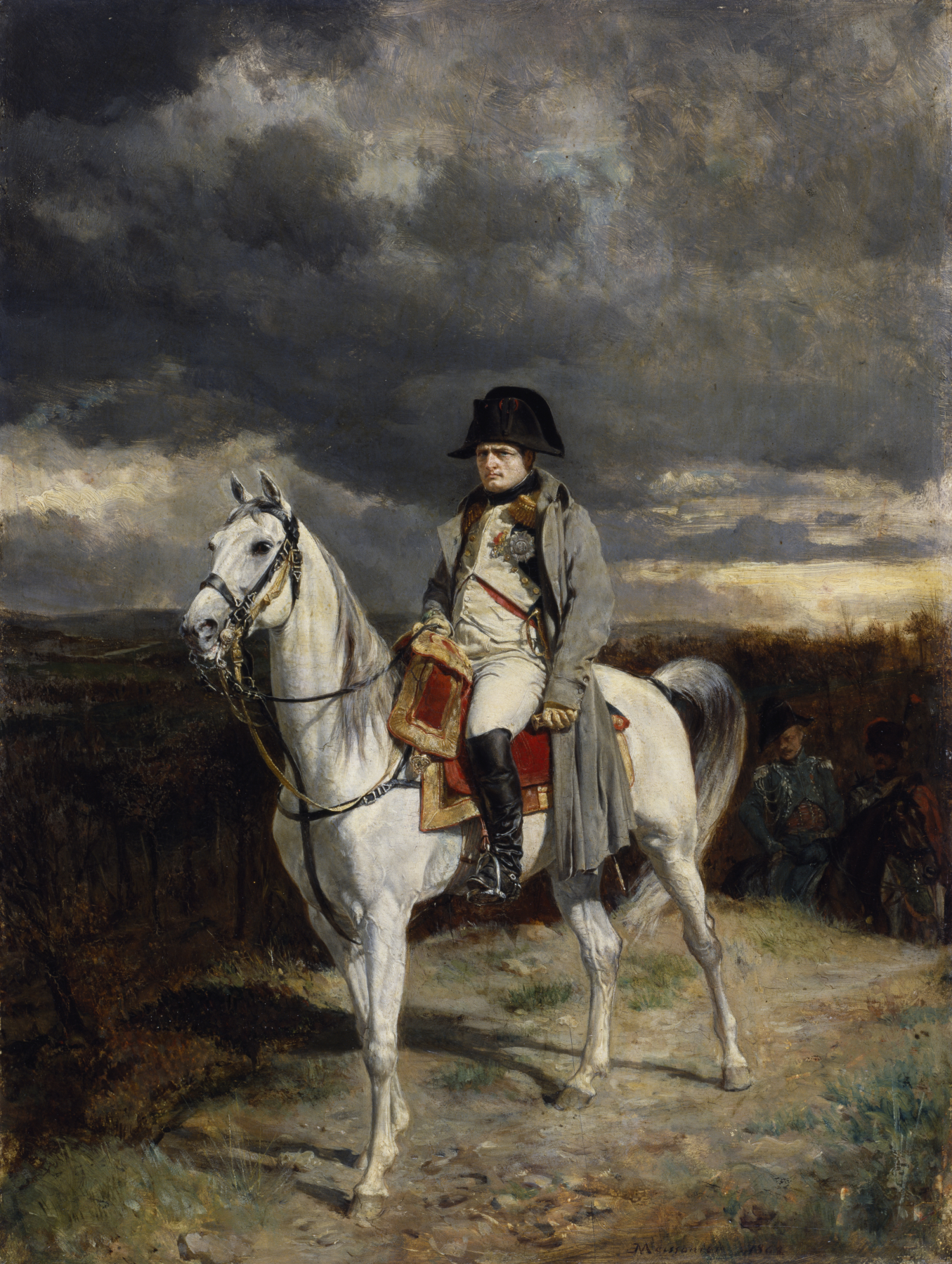
In this small painting commissioned by the subject's nephew, Prince Napoleon the emperor is portrayed in a forbidding landscape just after his last, hard-won victory in the 1814 French campaign that was fought at Arcis-sur-Aube: 23,000 French troops withstood the onslaught of 90,000 Austrians, but were unable to capitalize on their victory.

Saint Victor was a hermit and confessor at Arcis-sur-Aube in the 6th century. Around the same period a local coinage called Leudericus and Daovaldus was produced.

In 1546, François I authorized the construction of walls around the city.

Arcis was the scene of the Battle of Arcis-sur-Aube, a bloody battle fought by Napoleon I on 1 March 1814 against the Austro-Russians: part of the city was burned. An erroneous claim has been made that Arcis-sur-Aube bears its name as a commemoration of the Cossacks from the Russian army a city in Ukraine (Artsyz) and a village in the southern Urals (Arsinski or Арсинский). In reality, the town already bore the name since medieval times, as witnessed by three sources, including The Chronicle of Alberic de Trois-Fontaines, which names Hilduin II as "comes de Arceis et de Ramerut" (count of Arcis and Ramerurpt).

From 1790 to 1795 Arcis was the chief town of the arrondissement of Arcis-sur-Aube which was composed of 11 cantons and 89 communes. During the creation of arrondissements in 1800, Arcis became the capital of one of them, but this was abolished in 1926. The cantons of Arcis-sur-Aube and Ramerupt were attached to the Arrondissement of Troyes; the Canton of Méry-sur-Seine was attached to the Arrondissement of Nogent-sur-Seine, and the Canton of Chavanges was attached to the Arrondissement of Bar-sur-Aube. This was effective from 1801: 4 cantons and 93 communes.

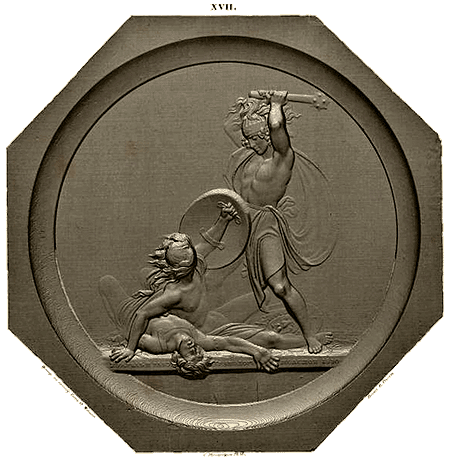
The Tolstoy Medal

=== Heraldry ===
Arms of Arcis-sur-Aube	Blazon: Azure, 6 roundels Argent posed 3-2-1, in chief Or, bordure in Gules.

== Administration ==
List of mayors

From	To	Name	Party	Position
1790		Georges Nicolas Jeannet-Oudin		
	1857	Romulus Ludot		
2001	2020	Serge Lardin	UDF then UMP then LR	Former General Councillor
2020	Present	Charles Hittler	Miscellaneous right	

During the 2026 French municipal elections, Arcis-sur-Aube received media and internet attention due to the names of its mayoral candidates: incumbent mayor Charles Hittler (whose surname is similar to Adolf Hitler) ran for re-election against Annie Soucat and Antoine Renault-Zielinski (whose surname is similar to Volodymyr Zelenskyy). Hittler was re-elected as mayor.

=== Twinning ===
Arcis-sur-Aube has twinning associations with:

- Gomaringen (Germany) since 1976.

== Population ==
The inhabitants of the commune are known as Arcisiens or Arcisiennes in French.

Historical population
Year	Pop.	±% p.a.
1968	3,213	—
1975	3,390	+0.77%
1982	3,216	−0.75%
1990	2,855	−1.48%
1999	2,841	−0.05%
2007	3,024	+0.78%
2012	2,975	−0.33%
2017	2,870	−0.72%
2023	2,785	−0.50%
Source: INSEE

== Economy ==
Besides many large farms producing different cereals, there is a major sugar plant there owned by Cristal Union.

== Culture and heritage ==
=== Civil heritage ===
The commune has a number of buildings and structures that are registered as historical monuments:

- The Savouré Factory at 47 rue des Anciens fossés (19th century)
- The Town Hall at Place des Héros (formerly a Chateau) (18th century)
- The former Chigot et cie Factory at 21 Rue Jean Jaurès (1908)
- The former Jules Bourgeois Factory at 21 Rue Jean Jaurès (19th century)
- The Gérard Fortier Factory at 44 Rue de Troyes (19th century)

=== Religious heritage ===
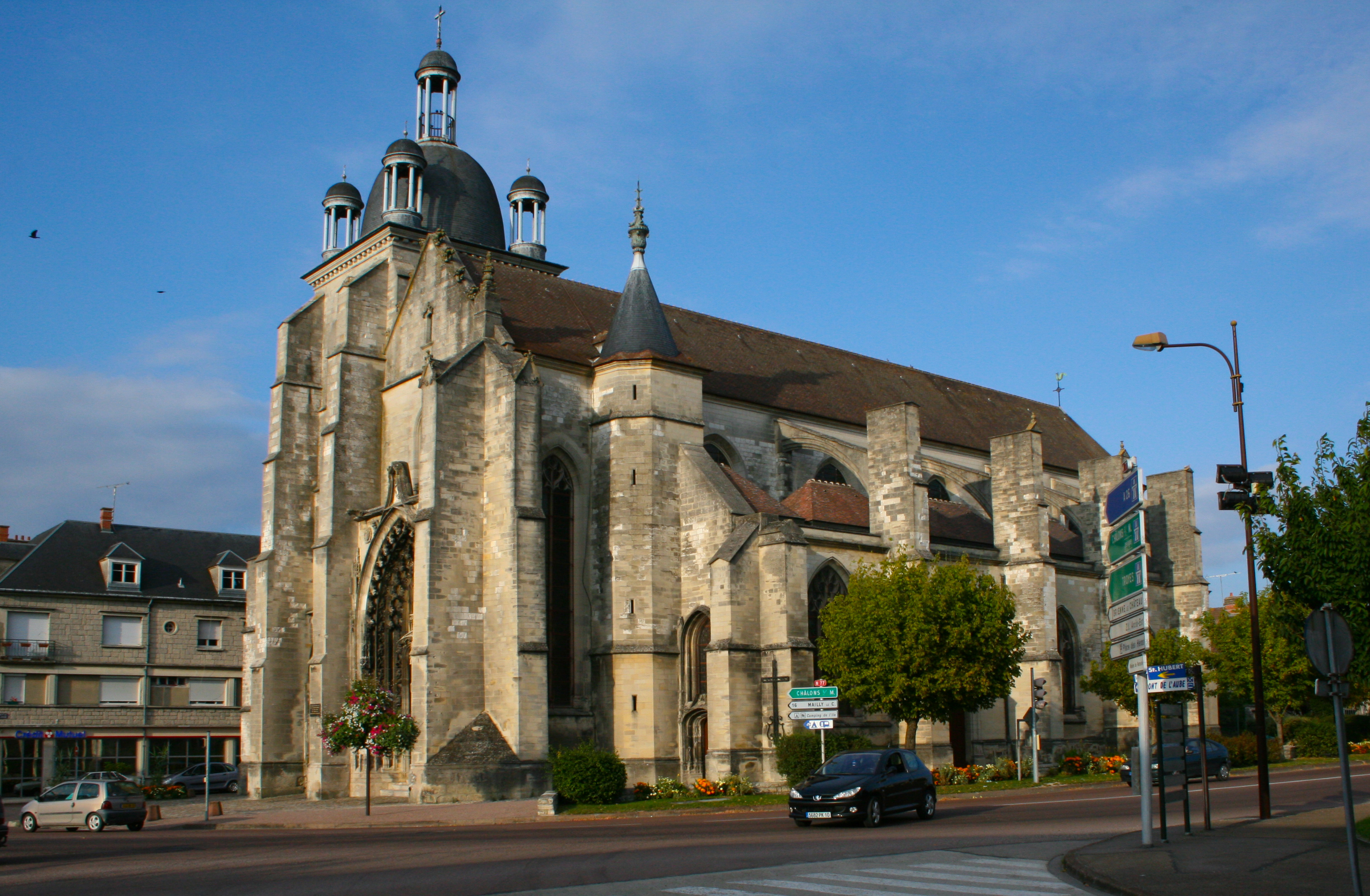
The Church of Saint-Étienne in 2007.

The Church of Saint-Étienne (16th century) is registered as a historical monument. It was bombed in June 1940 and then restored. It houses two pentagonal chapels and a flamboyant portal. The church contains many items that are registered as historical objects:

- A statue: Virgin and child (14th century)
- Stained glass windows (16th century)
- 2 prie-dieu (19th century)
- Ciboria (19th century)
- A paten (19th century)
- A chalice (18th century)
- A credence table (18th century)
- The furniture in the church

=== Arcis-sur-Aube picture gallery ===
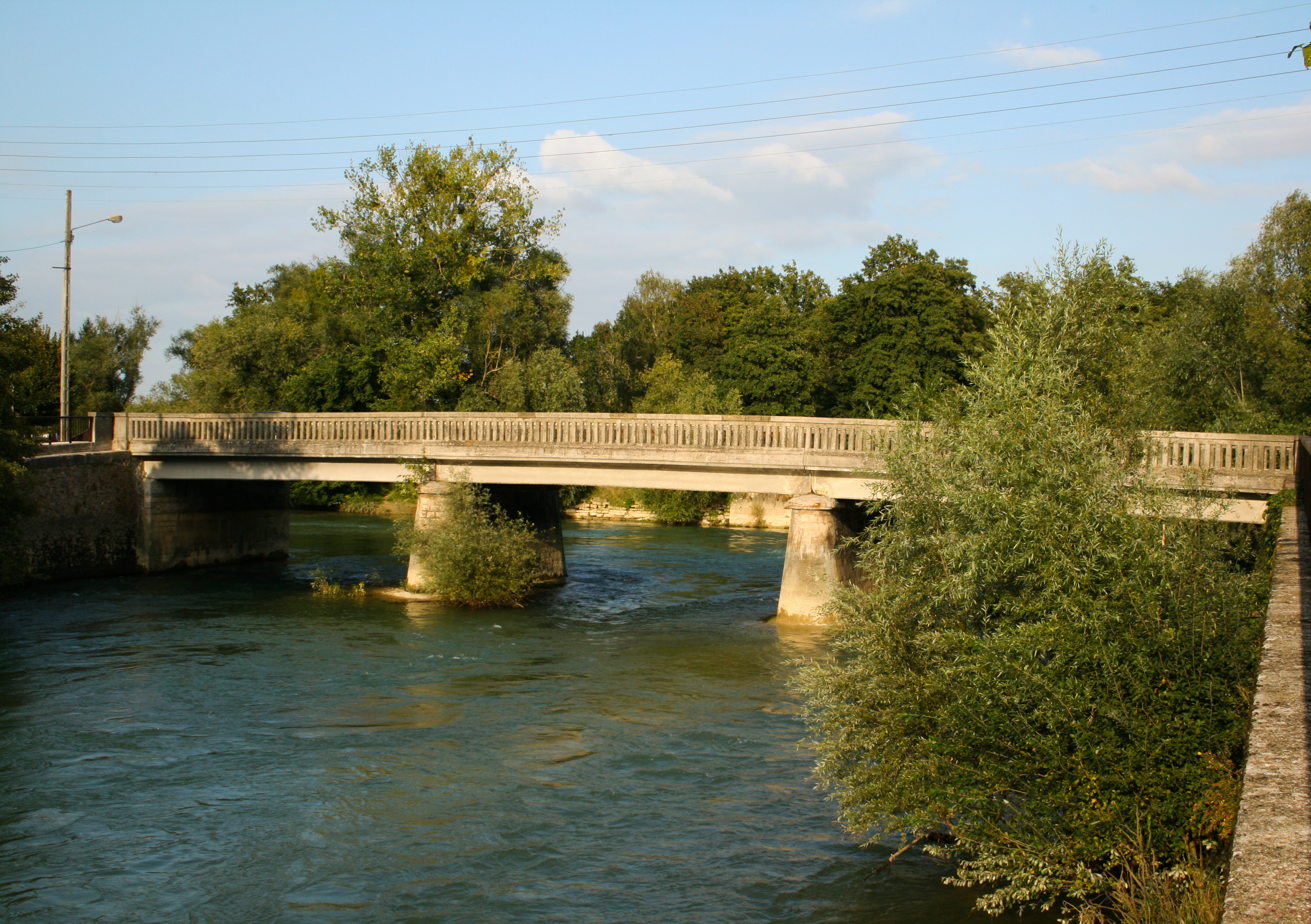
Bridge over the Aube: destroyed in 1940, rebuilt in 1942, destroyed in 1944, repaired in 1944, rebuilt in 1946.

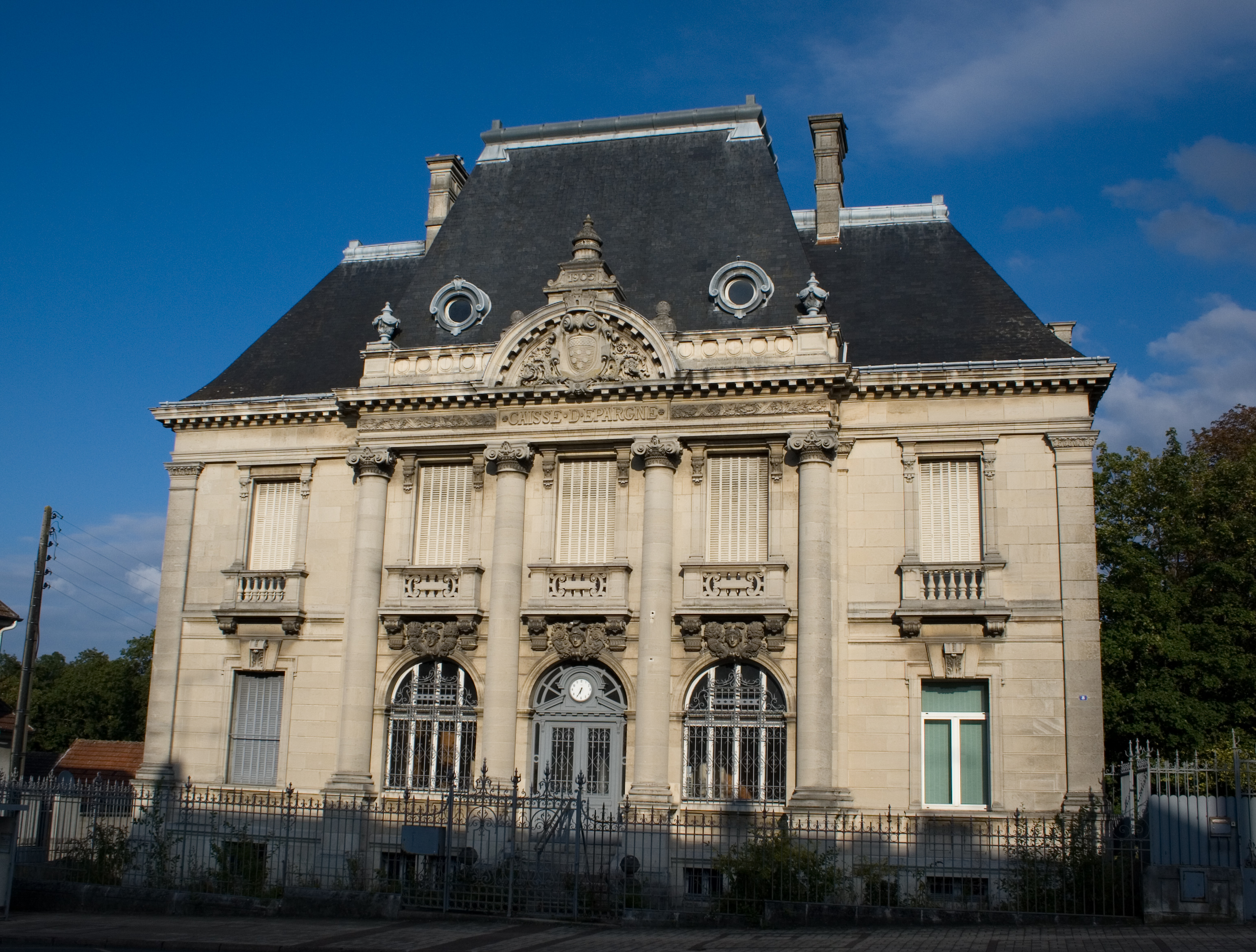
The bank at Arcis-sur-Aube

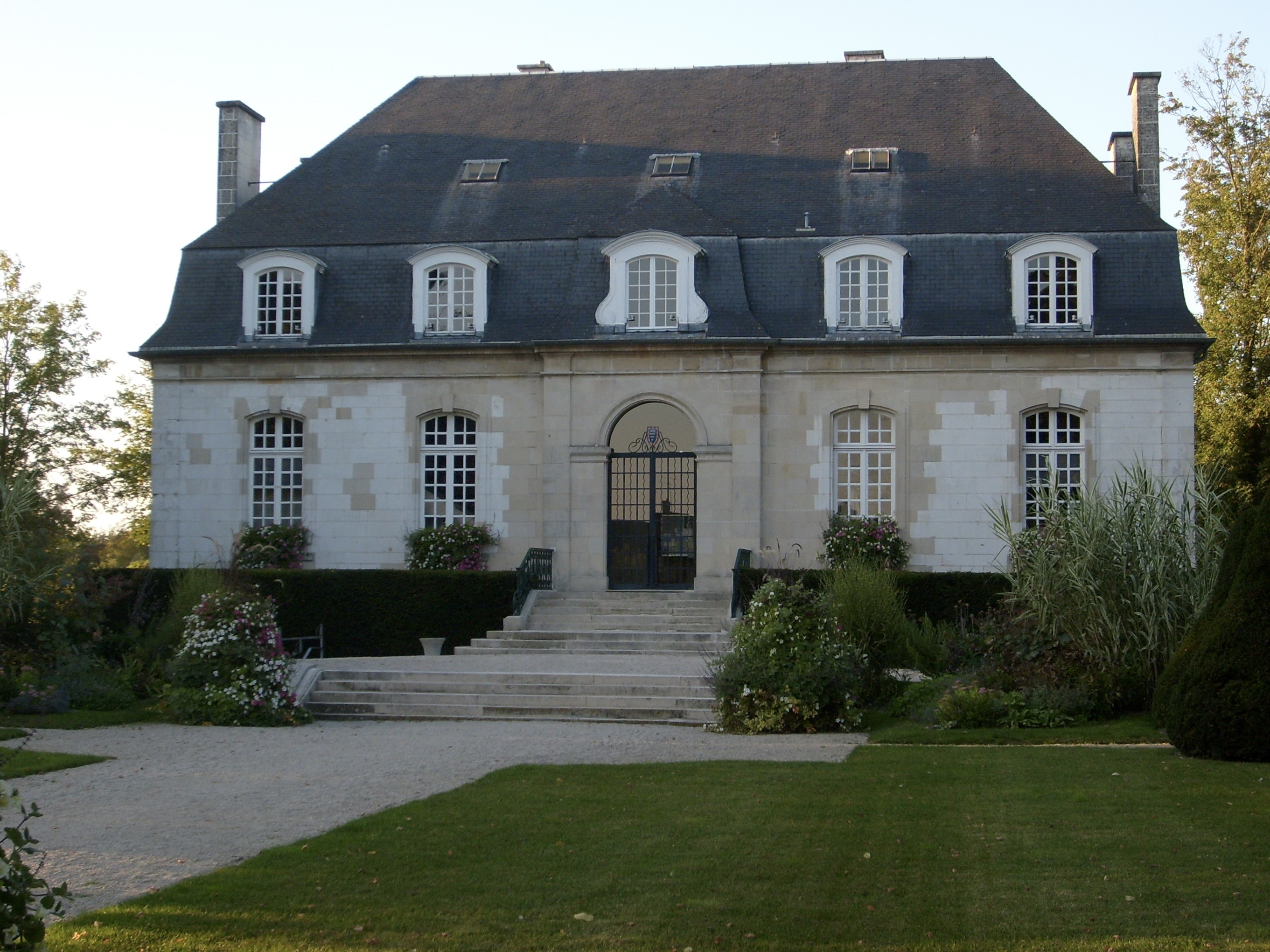
Arcis-sur-Aube Town Hall

The Festival Hall

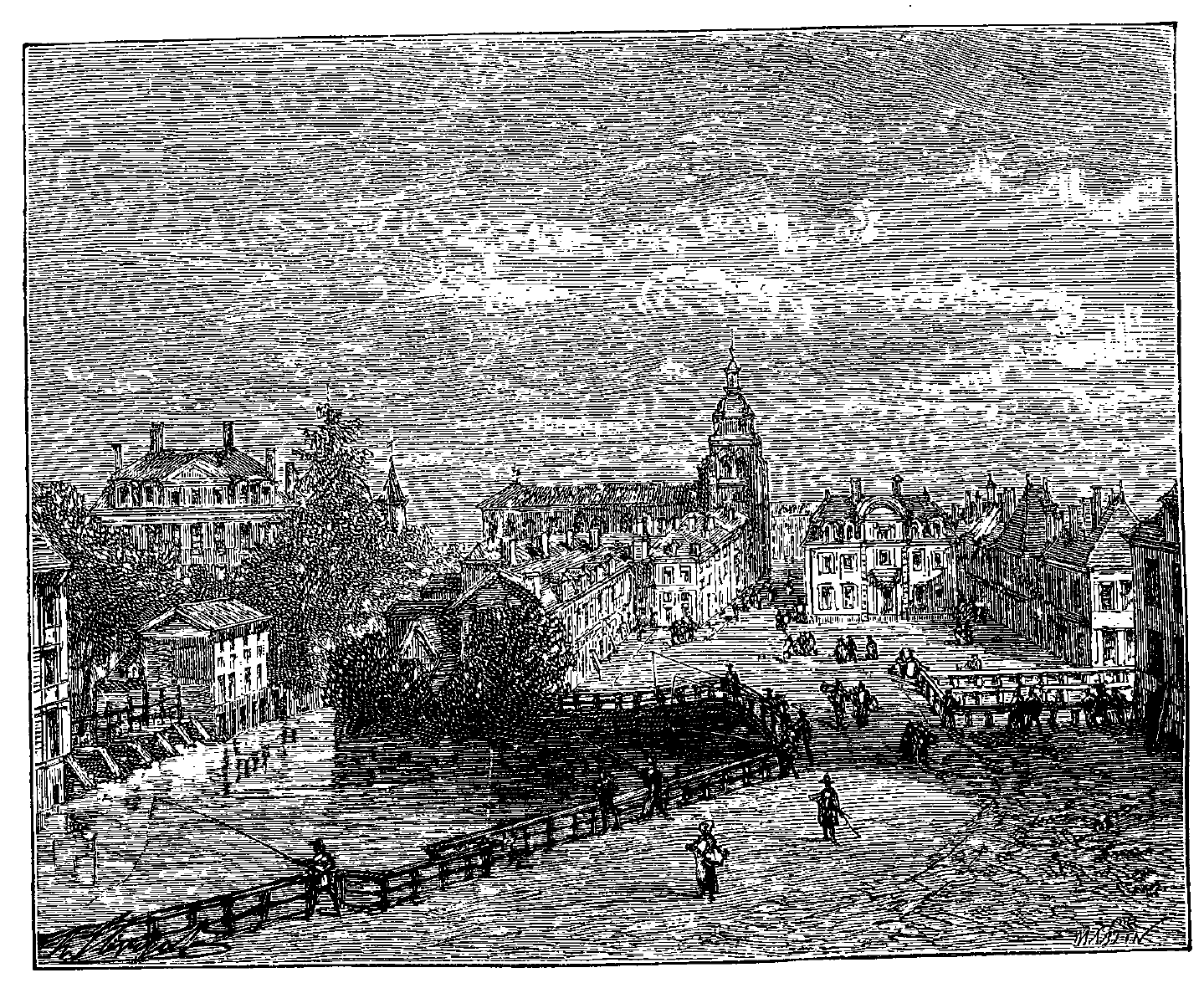
Arcis-sur-Aube in 1897

== Notable people linked to the commune ==
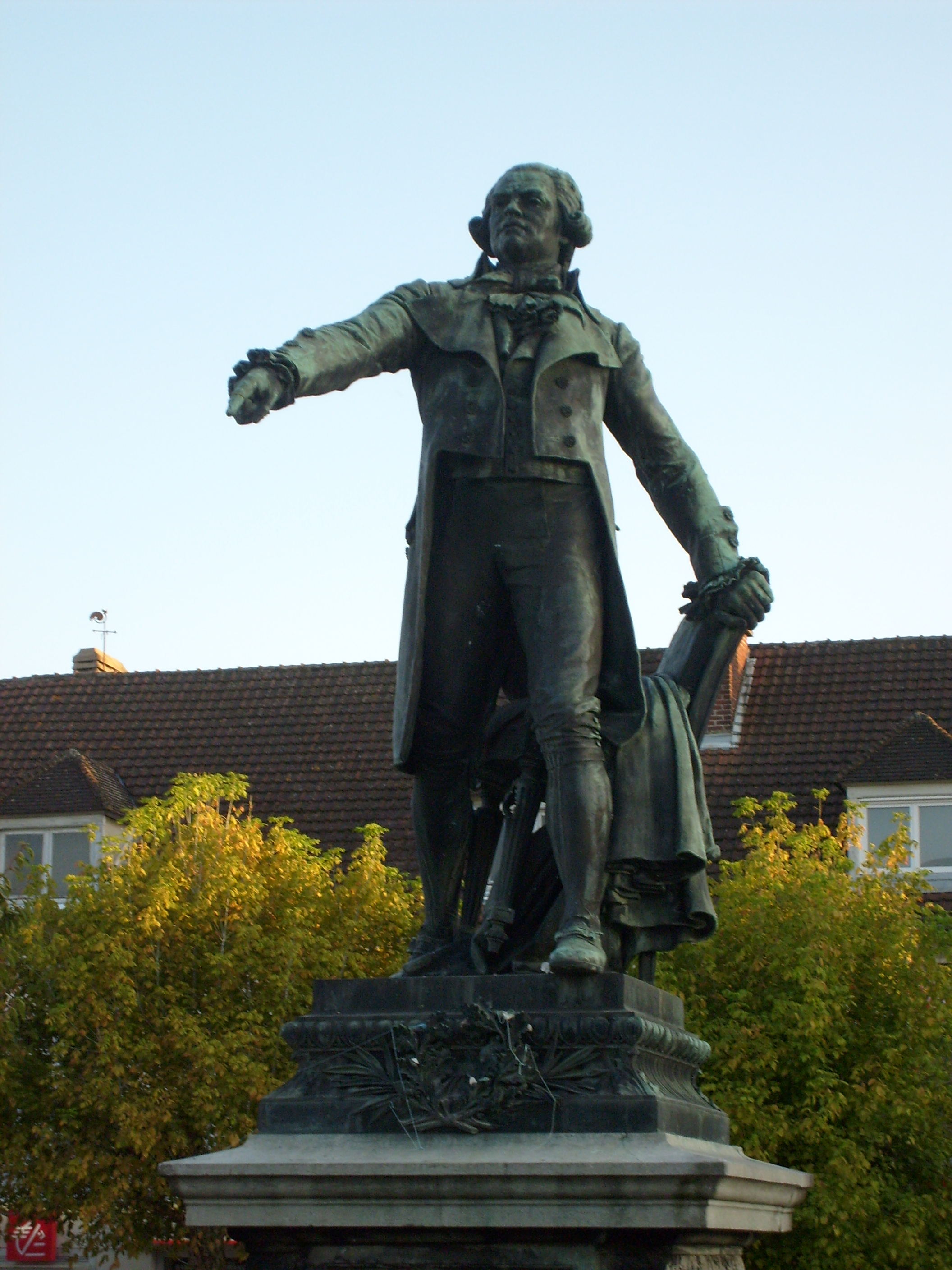
The statue of Danton in 2007

- Georges Jacques Danton, was born 26 October 1759 in Arcis-sur-Aube to a respectable though not wealthy family. He was given a good education, and he was launched in the career of an advocate at the Paris bar. He became a French revolutionary and died on the guillotine in Paris on 5 April 1794.
- Pierre Arnauld de La Briffe (6 May 1772, Paris - 11 September 1839, Arcis-sur-Aube), Lord of Arcis-sur-Aube before the French Revolution, military man and French politician in the 19th century.
- Hugues-Iéna Darcy (29 October 1807, Arcis-sur-Aube - 4 June 1880, Corcelles-les-Monts) high French official of the 19th century

=== In literature ===
Honoré de Balzac made Arcis-sur-Aube part of his novel Le Député d'Arcis (The Member for Arcis), left unfinished at his death and completed by Charles Rabbou. Arcis-sur-Aube was also the place of action in Une ténébreuse affaire (A murky affair) written in 1844.

== See also ==
- Communes of the Aube department
- Artsyz, a city in Odesa Oblast, Ukraine named after Arcis-sur-Aube
