= Champigny-sur-Aube =

Commune in Grand Est, France

- Commune
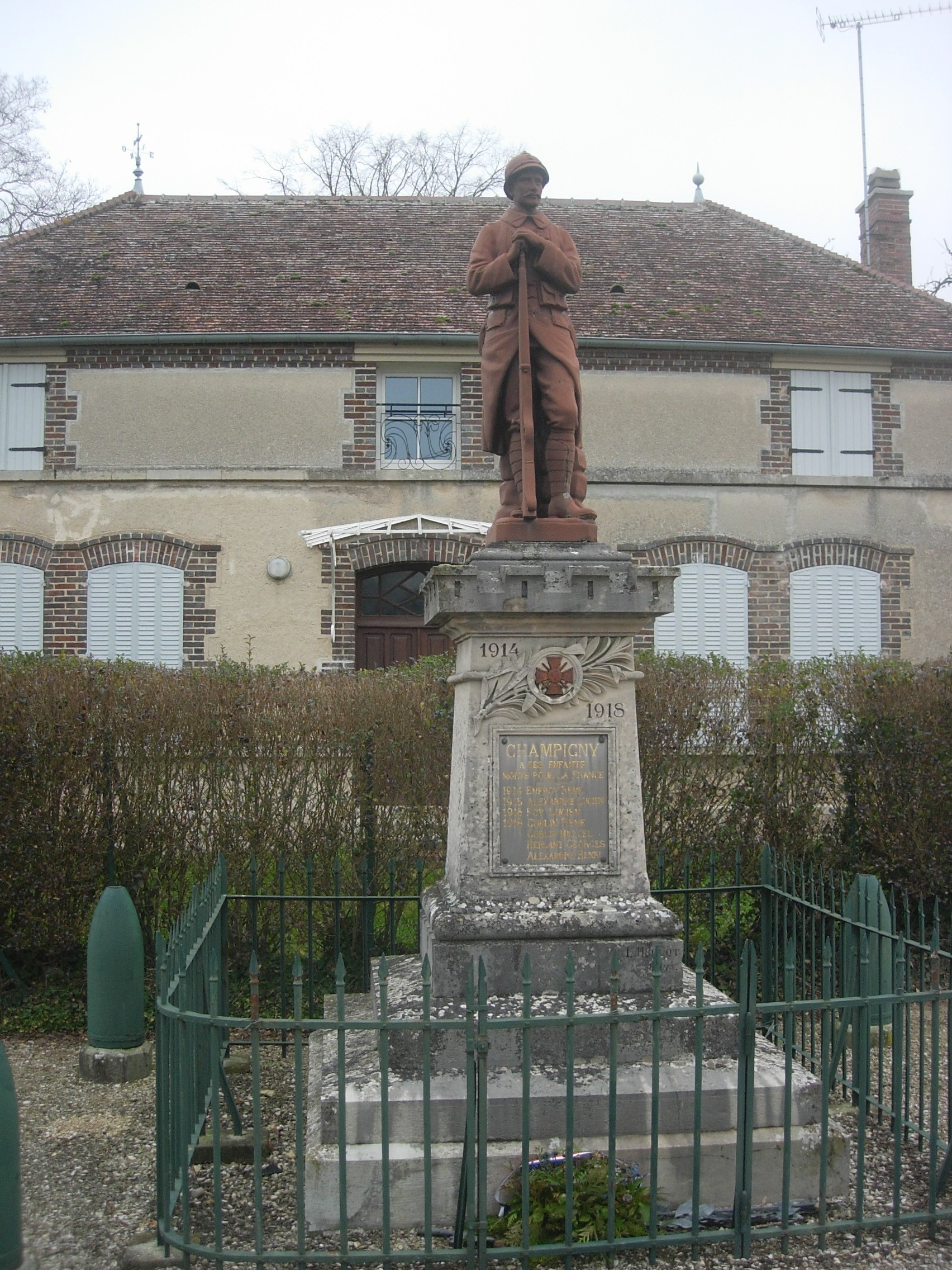
- War memorial
- Location of Champigny-sur-Aube
- Location within France Location within Grand Est
- Coordinates: 48°33′41″N 4°04′23″E
- Country: France
- Region: Grand Est
- Department: Aube
- Arrondissement: Troyes
- Canton: Arcis-sur-Aube

Government
  - Mayor (2020–2026): Damien Foy
- Area^{1}: 6.71 km^{2} (2.59 sq mi)
- Elevation: 85 m (279 ft)
- Highest elevation: 122 m (400 ft)
- Lowest elevation: 82 m (269 ft)
- Population (2023): 90
  - Density: 13/km^{2} (35/sq mi)
- Time zone: UTC+01:00 (CET)
  - Summer (DST): UTC+02:00 (CEST)
- INSEE/Postal code: 10077 /10700
- ^{1} French Land Register data, which excludes lakes, ponds, glaciers > 1 km^{2} (0.386 sq mi or 247 acres) and river estuaries.

Champigny-sur-Aube (French pronunciation: [ʃɑ̃piɲi syʁ ob], literally Champigny on Aube) is a commune in the Aube department in north-central France.

== Population ==
Historical population
Year	Pop.	±% p.a.
1968	58	—
1975	62	+0.96%
1982	66	+0.90%
1990	64	−0.38%
1999	59	−0.90%
2007	80	+3.88%
2012	94	+3.28%
2017	106	+2.43%
2023	90	−2.69%
Source: INSEE

== See also ==
- Communes of the Aube department
