= Aubette (Aube) =

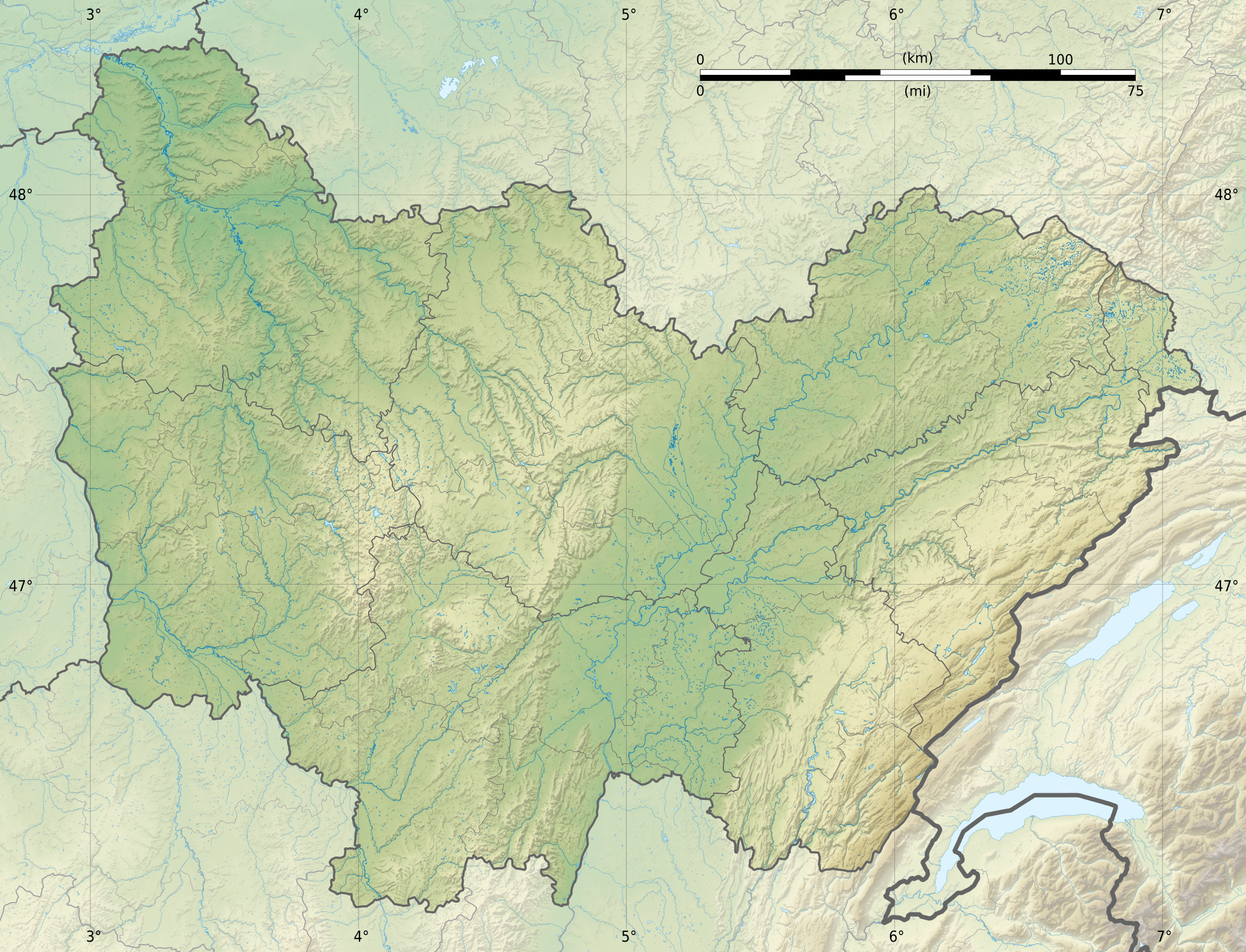
- Location within France Location within Bourgogne-Franche-Comté

Location
- Country: France

Physical characteristics
- Source
  - location: Côte-d'Or
- Mouth
  - location: Aube
  - coordinates: 47°55′12″N 4°52′08″E
- Length: 20 km (12 mi)

Basin features
- Progression: Aube→ Seine→ English Channel

The Aubette (French pronunciation: [obɛt]) is a 20 km long river of France (Côte-d'Or and Haute-Marne departments), which empties into the Aube near Dancevoir.
