= Villers-les-Bois =

- Commune
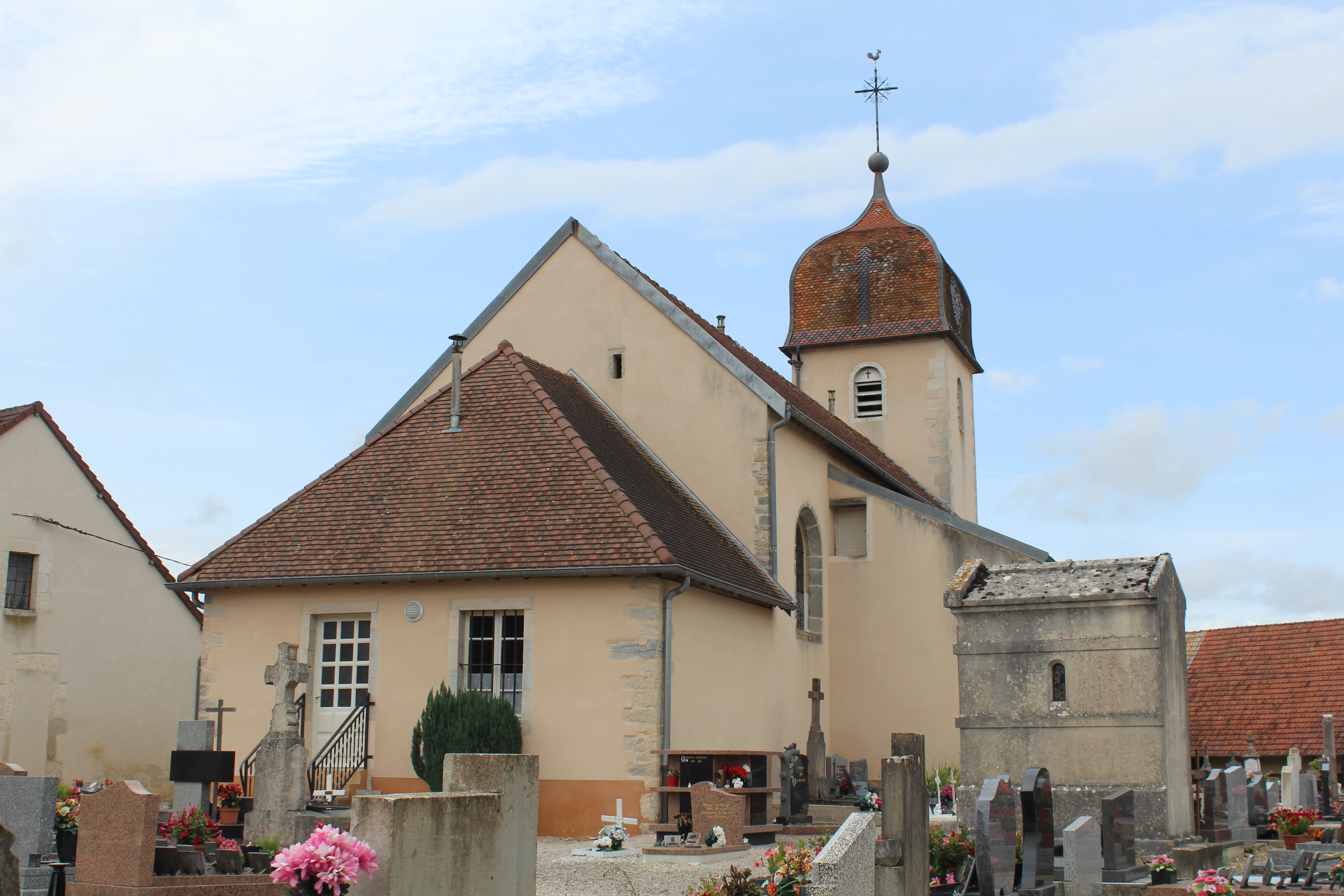
- The church in Villers-les-Bois
- Location of Villers-les-Bois
- Location within France Location within Bourgogne-Franche-Comté
- Coordinates: 46°54′51″N 5°34′48″E
- Country: France
- Region: Bourgogne-Franche-Comté
- Department: Jura
- Arrondissement: Dole
- Canton: Bletterans

Government
  - Mayor (2020–2026): Gérard Arnaud
- Area^{1}: 10.50 km^{2} (4.05 sq mi)
- Highest elevation: 252 m (827 ft)
- Lowest elevation: 212 m (696 ft)
- Population (2023): 226
  - Density: 21.5/km^{2} (55.7/sq mi)
- Time zone: UTC+01:00 (CET)
  - Summer (DST): UTC+02:00 (CEST)
- INSEE/Postal code: 39570 /39120
- ^{1} French Land Register data, which excludes lakes, ponds, glaciers > 1 km^{2} (0.386 sq mi or 247 acres) and river estuaries.

Villers-les-Bois (French pronunciation: [vilɛʁ le bwa]) is a commune in the Jura department in the Bourgogne-Franche-Comté region in eastern France.

== Population ==
Historical population
Year	Pop.	±% p.a.
1968	169	—
1975	141	−2.55%
1982	142	+0.10%
1990	211	+5.07%
1999	209	−0.11%
2007	194	−0.93%
2012	204	+1.01%
2017	212	+0.77%
2023	226	+1.07%
Source: INSEE

== See also ==
- Communes of the Jura department
