= George Villiers =

George Villiers may refer to:

- George Villiers (died 1606) (c. 1544–1606), minor English gentleman, father of George Villiers, 1st Duke of Buckingham
- George Villiers, 1st Duke of Buckingham (1592–1628), courtier of James I of England, minister to Charles I
- George Villiers, 2nd Duke of Buckingham (1628–1687), English politician, son of the first Duke, exiled with Charles II
- George Villiers, 4th Viscount Grandison (1618–1699), Anglo-Irish peer
- George Villiers, 4th Earl of Jersey (1735–1805), English Member of Parliament for Tamworth, Aldborough, Dover
- George Villiers (1759–1827), English Member of Parliament for Warwick
- George Villiers, 4th Earl of Clarendon (1800–1870), English diplomat and statesman, Foreign Secretary
- George Villiers, 6th Earl of Clarendon (1877–1955), British Conservative politician, Governor-General of South Africa
- Georges Villiers (1899–1982), French mining engineer

== See also ==
- George Child Villiers (disambiguation)
