= Aubette de Magny =

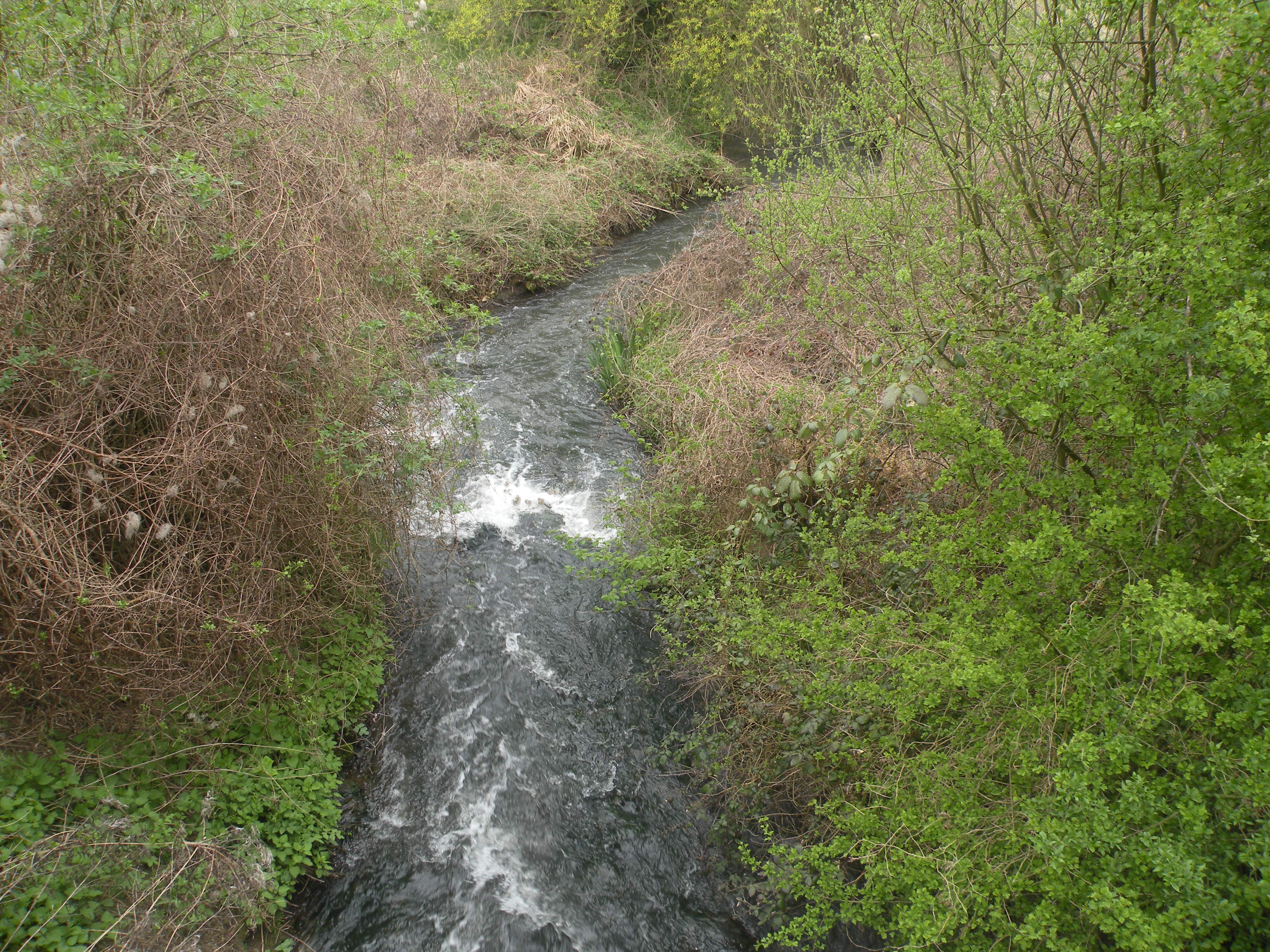

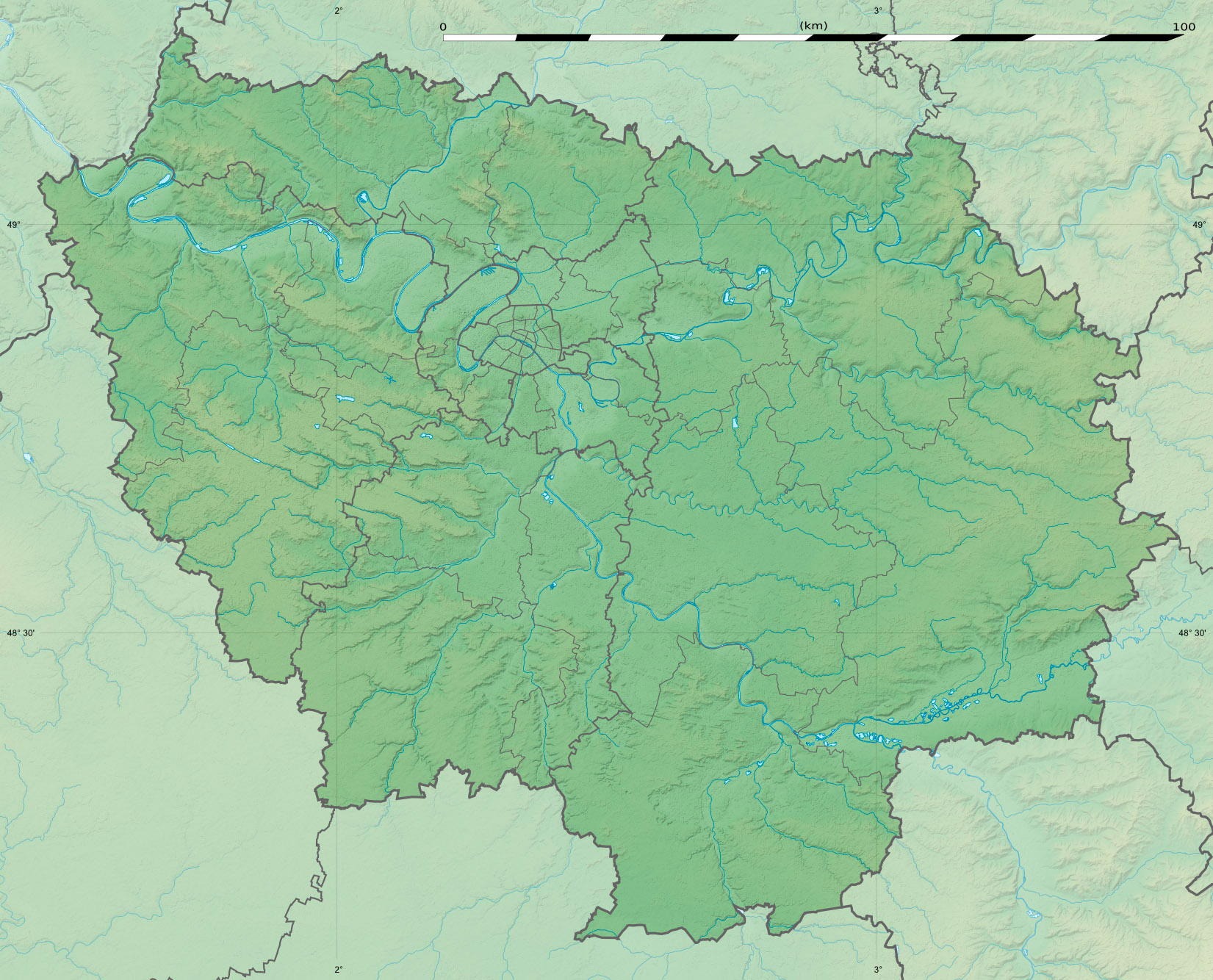
- Location within France Location within Île-de-France (region)

Location
- Country: France

Physical characteristics
- Mouth: Epte
  - coordinates: 49°8′55″N 1°39′27.5″E
- Length: 15.6 km (9.7 mi)

Basin features
- Progression: Epte→ Seine→ English Channel

Aubette de Magny (French pronunciation: [obɛt də maɲi]) is a tributary of the river Epte in Val-d'Oise. It is 15.6 km (9.7 mi) long. Its source is near Magny-en-Vexin. It flows into the Epte at Bray-et-Lû.
