= Herbisse =

Commune in Grand Est, France

- Commune
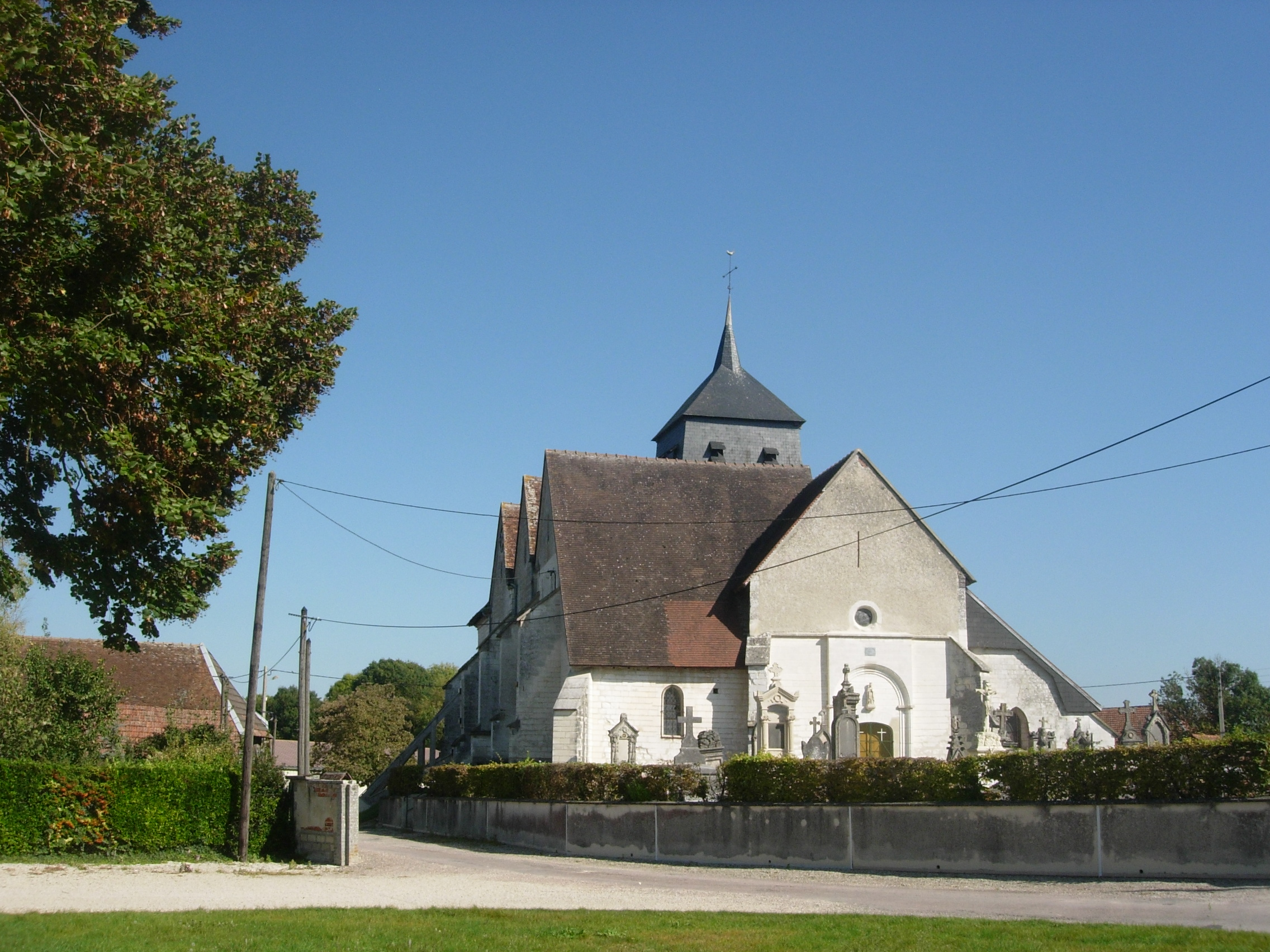
- The church in Herbisse

- Coat of arms
- Location of Herbisse
- Location within France Location within Grand Est
- Coordinates: 48°37′27″N 4°06′47″E
- Country: France
- Region: Grand Est
- Department: Aube
- Arrondissement: Troyes
- Canton: Arcis-sur-Aube

Government
  - Mayor (2020–2026): Jean-Pierre Lambert
- Area^{1}: 22.04 km^{2} (8.51 sq mi)
- Elevation: 105 m (344 ft)
- Highest elevation: 120 m (390 ft)
- Lowest elevation: 98 m (322 ft)
- Population (2023): 148
  - Density: 6.72/km^{2} (17.4/sq mi)
- Time zone: UTC+01:00 (CET)
  - Summer (DST): UTC+02:00 (CEST)
- INSEE/Postal code: 10172 /10700
- ^{1} French Land Register data, which excludes lakes, ponds, glaciers > 1 km^{2} (0.386 sq mi or 247 acres) and river estuaries.

Herbisse (French pronunciation: [ɛʁbis]) is a commune in the Aube department in north-central France.

== Geography ==
Herbisse is a small village in the Champagne crayeuse located on a stream call l'Herbissonne. Most of the village's land is used for agriculture.

== Population ==
Historical population
Year	Pop.	±% p.a.
1968	242	—
1975	192	−3.25%
1982	170	−1.72%
1990	168	−0.15%
1999	149	−1.32%
2007	183	+2.60%
2012	176	−0.78%
2017	166	−1.16%
2023	148	−1.89%
Source: INSEE

== Monuments ==
- The Roman Catholic Church dedicated to the Virgin Mary
- The Memorial dedicated to the soldiers from the village who dies in World War I and World War II.
- the Tombstones of 7 Royal Air Force airmen (5 of the Royal Air Force Voluntary Reserve and 2 from the Royal New Zealand Air Force) of the 49 Squadron Bomber Command. They died on 19 July 1944 when their Lancaster Mk III (Number JB178) crashed. The crew was on its 27th mission.
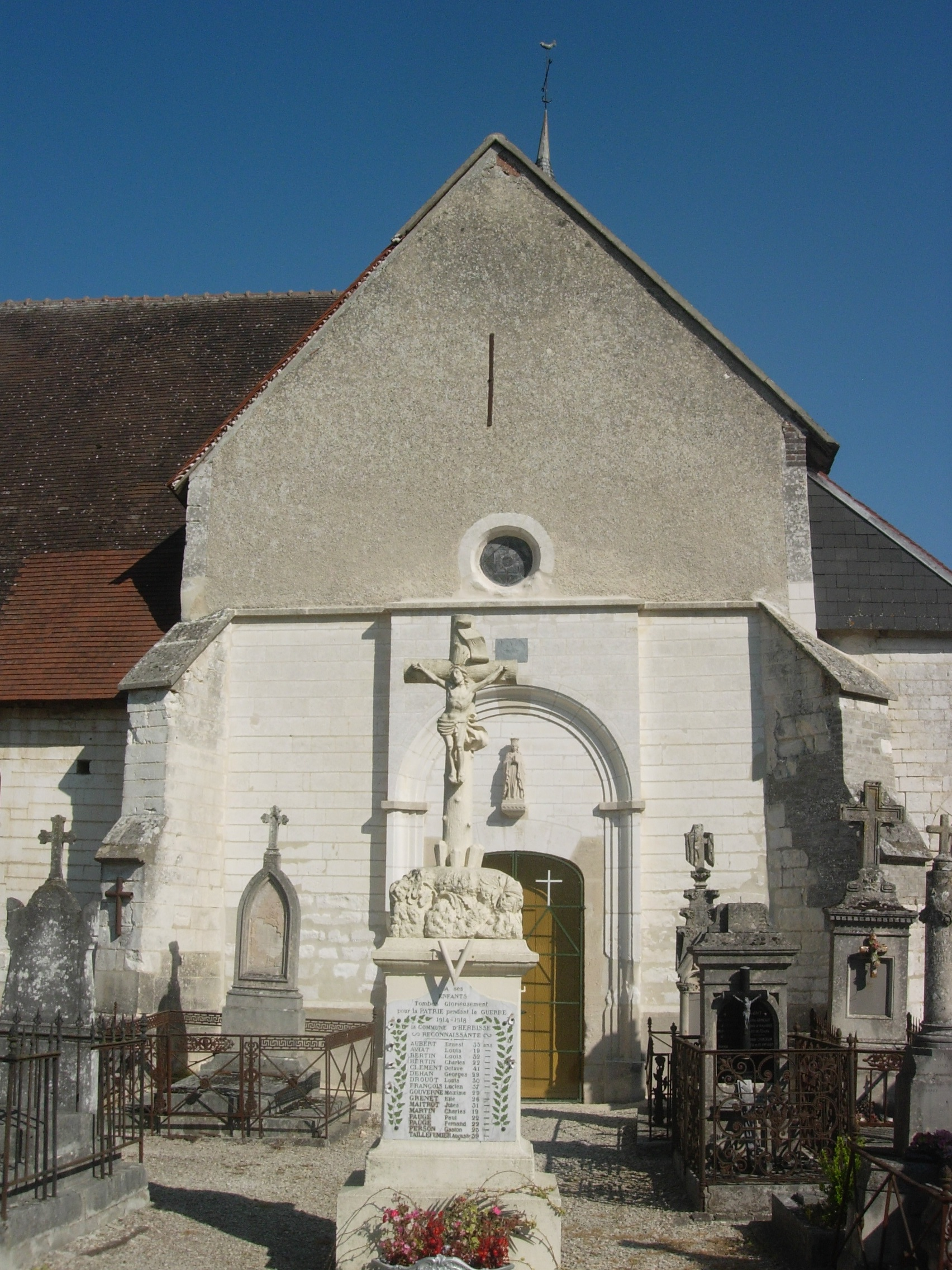
The Memorial located in front of the church, in the cemetery

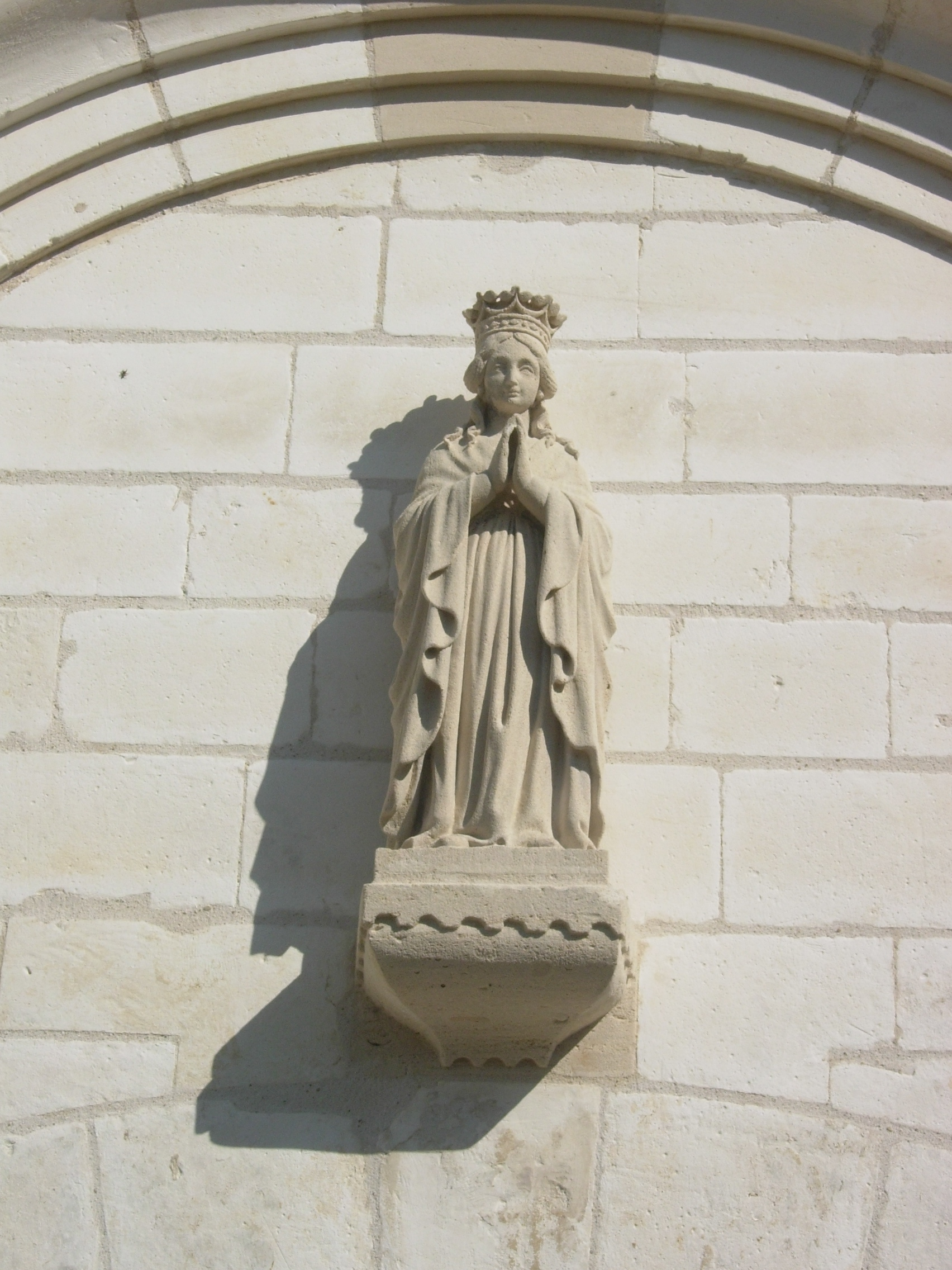
The Virgin Mary in the front of the church

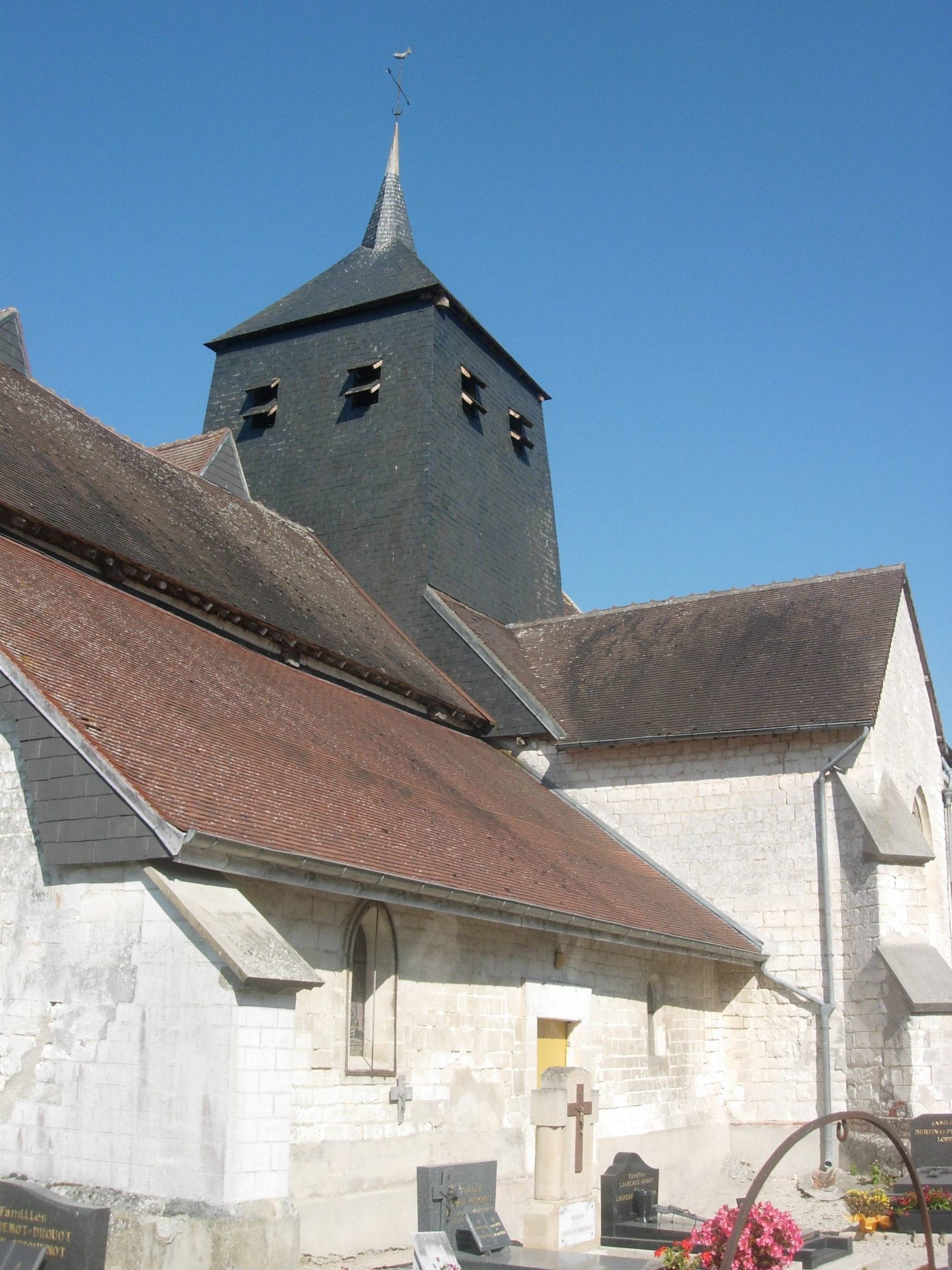
The church tower

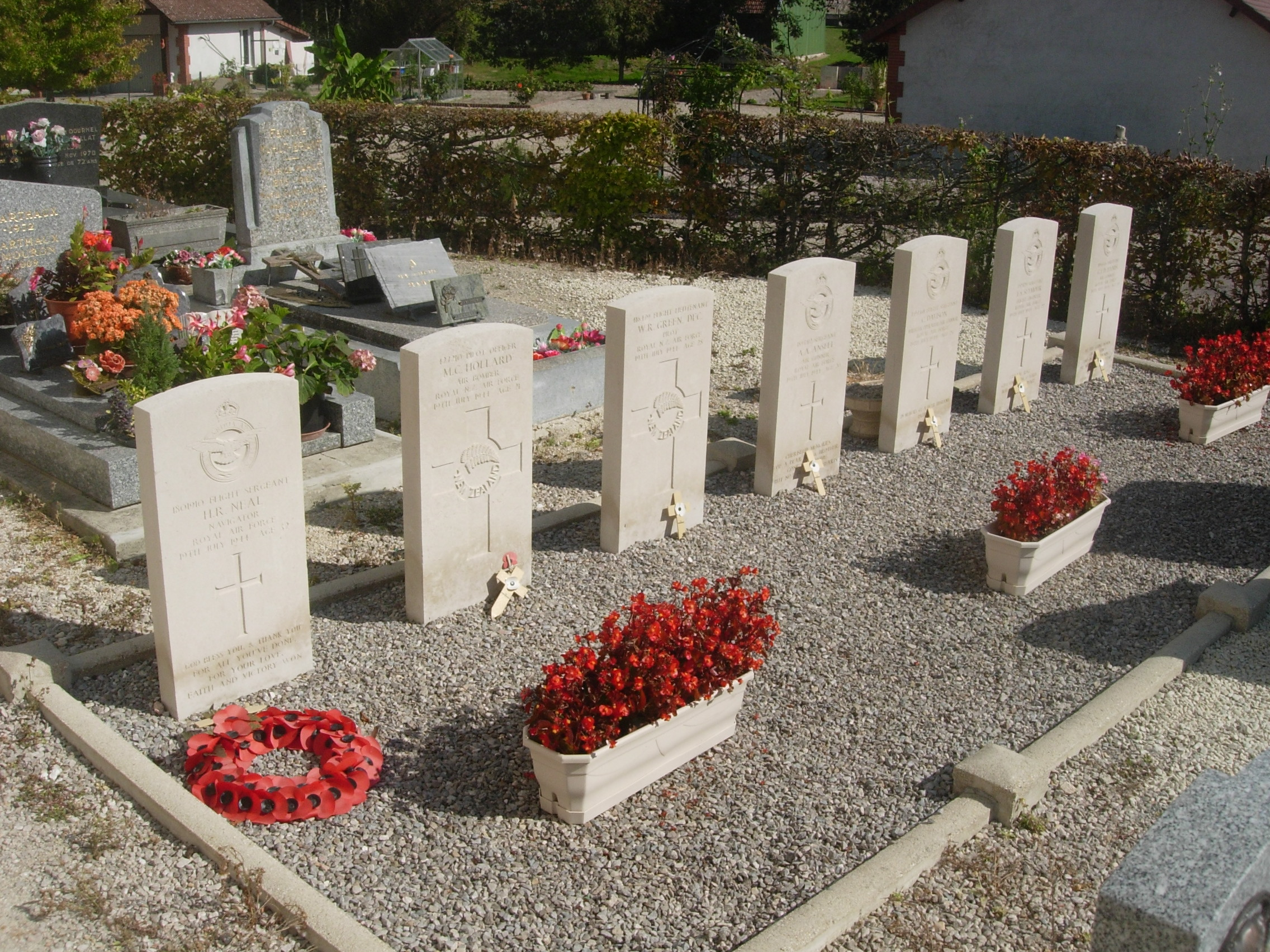
Royal Air Force tombstones in the cemetery

== See also ==
- Communes of the Aube department
