= William Villiers =

William Villiers may refer to:

- William Villiers, 2nd Viscount Grandison (died 1643), English soldier of the Civil War
- Sir William Villiers, 3rd Baronet (1645–1711), English member of parliament for Leicester
- William Villiers, 2nd Earl of Jersey (died 1721), English member of parliament for Kent, later peer
- William Villiers, 3rd Earl of Jersey (died 1769), English peer, a founding Governor of the Foundling Hospital
- William Villiers, 10th Earl of Jersey (born 1976), British actor, writer, producer
