= Pieter de Villiers =

Pieter de Villiers may refer to:

- Pieter de Villiers (hurdler) (born 1982), South African hurdler
- Pieter de Villiers (rugby union) (born 1972), South African-born French rugby union former player and coach

== See also ==
- Peter de Villiers (born 1957), South African rugby union coach and politician
