= Champagne crayeuse =

Natural region in Grand Est, France

Coordinates: 48.92°N 4.33°E

Champagne crayeuse (French pronunciation: [ʃɑ̃paɲ kʁɛjøz], "chalky Champagne") is a natural region in Grand Est, northeastern France. Its name refers to the chalk subsoil found throughout the region. The main cities in the region are Reims, Châlons-en-Champagne and Troyes.
