= John Villers =

16th-century English politician

Sir John Villers (1485/1486 – 8 December 1544), of Brooksby Hall, Leicestershire, was an English politician.

He was the only son of Sir John Villers of Brooksby. He succeeded his father in 1506 and was knighted c. 1515.

In 1520 he was with Henry VIII at the Field of Cloth of Gold and the meeting with Charles V at Gravelines and in 1522 served in the Picardy campaign. He returned to France ten years later for Henry VIII's meeting with Francis I at Calais.

He served as a commissioner on many occasions during his lifetime. He was a justice of the peace for Leicestershire from 1514 to his death and appointed High Sheriff of Warwickshire and Leicestershire for 1531–32 and 1537–38. He was made a Knight of the Body. He was elected a member (MP) of the Parliament of England for Leicestershire in 1539.

He married Elizabeth, the daughter of John Winger of London, with whom he had a daughter. With no legitimate male heir, his bequeathed his lands at Brooksby and elsewhere to his brothers and an illegitimate son.
