= Aube (river) =

River in France

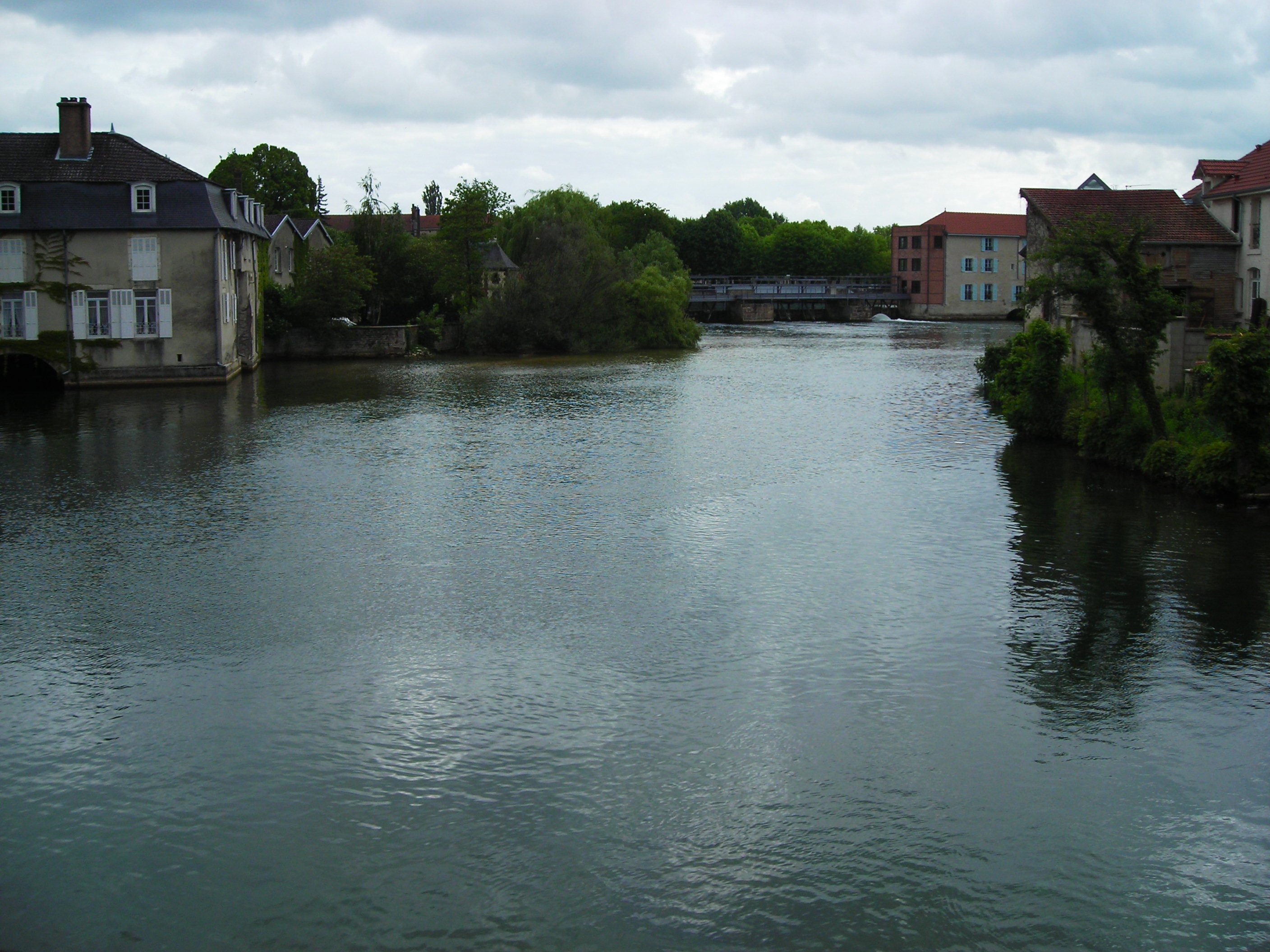
- Aube at Bar-sur-Aube

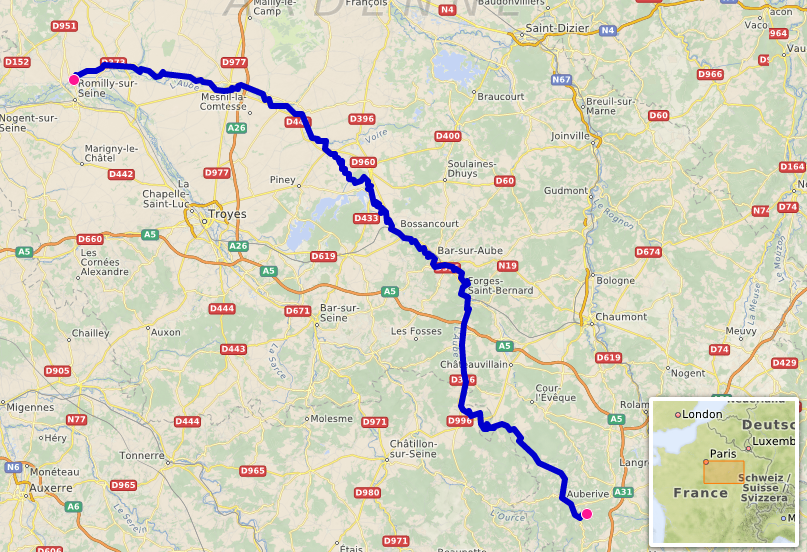

Location
- Country: France

Physical characteristics
- Source
  - location: Champagne-Ardenne
  - coordinates: 47°45′37″N 5°7′29″E
- Mouth
  - location: Seine
  - coordinates: 48°33′26″N 3°43′3″E
- Length: 249 km (155 mi)
- Basin size: 3,600 km^{2} (1,400 mi^{2})
- Discharge
  - average: 34 m^{3}/s (1,200 cu ft/s)

Basin features
- Progression: Seine→ English Channel

The Aube (French pronunciation: [ob]) is a river in France, a right tributary of the Seine. It is 248.9 kilometres (154.7 mi) long. The river gives its name to the Aube department.

Its source is in the Haute-Marne department, on the plateau of Langres, near the town of Auberive. It flows through the departments of Haute-Marne, Côte-d'Or, Aube, and Marne. It flows into the river Seine near Marcilly-sur-Seine. Cities along the river include Bar-sur-Aube and Arcis-sur-Aube.

== Main tributaries ==
- Aubette
- Aujon
- Landon
- Voire
- Ravet
- Meldançon
- Puits
- Huitrelle
- Herbissonne
- Barbuise
- Salon
- Superbe

== Departments and towns crossed ==
- Haute-Marne: Auberive
- Côte-d'Or: Montigny-sur-Aube
- Aube: Bar-sur-Aube, Brienne-le-Château, Ramerupt, Arcis-sur-Aube
- Marne: Anglure

== See also ==
- The Albian Age in the Cretaceous Period of geological time is named for the River Aube (after the Latin name for the river, Alba)
- Rivers of France
