= Blaise =

Blaise is a personal name (from Greek Βλασιος, the name of Saint Blaise) and a place name. It can refer to:

== People and fictional characters ==
- Blaise (name), including lists of people and fictional characters with the given name or surname

== Places ==
=== France ===
- Blaise-sous-Arzillières, a village and commune in the Marne département of north-eastern France
- Blaise, a former commune of the Ardennes département, now part of Vouziers
- Blaise, a former commune of the Haute-Marne département, now part of Colombey-les-Deux-Églises
- Blaise (Marne), a tributary of the Marne River, northeastern France
- Blaise (Eure), a tributary of the Eure (river), northern France

=== Switzerland ===
- Gate of Blaise, an ancient city gate in Basel

=== United Kingdom ===
- Blaise Castle, a stately home in what is now the city of Bristol, England
- Blaise Hamlet, built about 1811 for retired employees of the owner of Blaise Castle
- Blaise High School, Bristol, England

== See also ==
- Blaise reaction, a type of chemical reaction
- Blaise ketone synthesis, a specific chemical reaction
- Cirey-sur-Blaise, a village and commune in the Haute-Marne département of north-eastern France
- Courcelles-sur-Blaise, a village and commune in the Haute-Marne département
- Guindrecourt-sur-Blaise, a village and commune in the Haute-Marne département
- Montreuil-sur-Blaise, a village and commune in the Haute-Marne département
- Vaux-sur-Blaise, a village and commune in the Haute-Marne département
- Wassy-sur-Blaise, a commune of the Haute-Marne département
- Blaise (film), a 2026 French animated film
- Blais, a surname
- Blasius (disambiguation)
- Blaize (given name)
- Blaize (surname)
