= Blaise (name) =

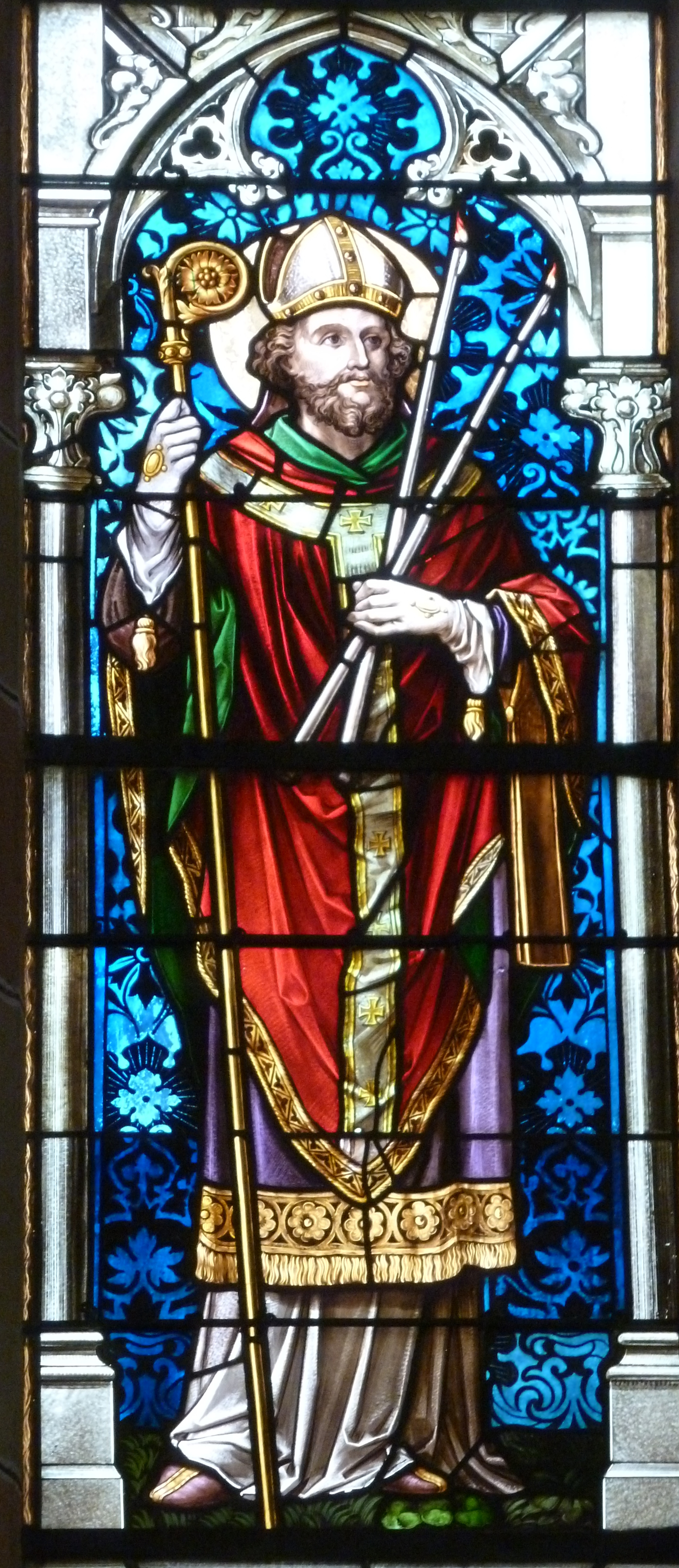
- Stained glass window of Saint Blaise
- Pronunciation: 'Blaze'
- Gender: Male
- Name day: February 3

Origin
- Origin: French (derived from Latin)

Other names
- Related names: Blaize, Basil, Balbus, Balbino, Balbo

Blaise is a masculine given name and surname. It is the French derivation of the Latin Blaesus (later Blasius), Greek Βλάσιος (Vlasios), and is of uncertain etymological origin.

One of the first known to bear the name was Roman proconsul Quintus Junius Blaesus. The name was popularized by Saint Blaise of Sebastia.

== People ==
=== Given name ===
- Baboucarr-Blaise Jagne, Gambian foreign minister and United Nations representative
- Blaise Alexander, American race car driver
- Blaise Andries, American football player
- Blaise Cendrars, Franco-Swiss novelist and poet
- Blaise Compaoré, ex-president of Burkina Faso
- Blaise Diagne, Senegalese politician, mayor of Dakar
- Blaise Diesbourg, American gangster and bootlegger
- Blaise Garza, American actor
- Blaise Gisbert, French Jesuit rhetorician and critic
- Blaise Ingoglia, American politician
- Blaise Koissy, Côte d'Ivoire football player
- Blaise Kouassi (footballer, born 1974), former Côte d'Ivoire football defender
- Blaise Kouassi (footballer, born 1983), Ivorian footballer
- Blaise Kufo, Congolese-Swiss football player
- Blaise Godbe Lipman, American actor and director
- Blaise Matuidi, French football player
- Blaise de Montluc, French soldier
- Blaise Pascal, French mathematician
- Blaise Rabetafika, Malagasy diplomat
- Blaise Senghor, Senegalese filmmaker and diplomat
- Blaise Sonnery, French cyclist
- Blaise Daniel Staples, American classicist
- Blaise de Vigenère, French diplomat and cryptographer
- Blaise Winter, American football player and speaker
- Mamadou Blaise Sangaré, Malian politician
- Jean-Blaise Martin, French opera singer

=== Surname ===
- Clark Blaise, Canadian author
- Kerlin Blaise, American football player
- Marie-Joseph Blaise de Chénier, French poet, dramatist, and politician
- Pierre Blaise, French actor
- Saint Blaise, Armenian physician and bishop of Sebaste (Sivas)
- Serge Moléon Blaise, Haitian painter
- Tara Blaise, Irish singer
- Jean-Blaise Kololo, Congolese politician and diplomat
- Braz or Brás, a 19th-century Portuguese cook from Bairro Alto, in Lisbon, who allegedly created or popularized the dish bacalhau à Brás

== Fictional characters ==
- Blaise, in some accounts was Merlin's master in Arthurian legends. In Malory's version he appeared to Merlin to warn him of Nimue's mischief.
- Blaise Zabini, a minor Slytherin character in J.K. Rowling's Harry Potter series
- Modesty Blaise, heroine of a Peter O'Donnell comic strip
- Bleys, a Prince of Amber, probably inspired by Merlin's tutor, he is a magically adept swordsman and charming rake.

== Spellings ==
The following are related to the forename Blaise:

- Armenian: Բարսեղ (Barsegh)
- Catalan: Blai
- Croatian: Blaž; Vlaho (Dubrovnik region)
- English: Blaise, Blase, Blaize, Blaze
- French: Blaise
- Galician: Βrais
- German: Blasius
- Greek: Βλασιος (Vlasios)
- Hungarian: Balázs
- Italian: Biagio
- Kurdish: بله‌یز
- Latin: Blasius
- Polish: Błażej
- Portuguese: Brás (archaic spelling Braz)
- Romanian: Vlasie, Vasile
- Russian: Власий (Vlasiy)
- Spanish: Blas
- Turkish: Vlas
- Ukrainian: Улас (Ulas)

== See also ==
- Saint Blaise (disambiguation)
- Blaise (disambiguation)
- Blaize (given name)
- Blaize (surname)
- Blais
