= Blaze =

Blaze may refer to:

== Films ==
- Blaze (1989 film), starring Paul Newman and Lolita Davidovich, the latter as stripper Blaze Starr
- Blaze (2018 film), based on the life of country musician Blaze Foley
- Blaze (2022 film), an Australian drama film

== Music ==
=== Groups ===
- Blaze (group), a house-music production team formed in 1984 in New Jersey, US
- Blaze (Japanese band), a band known for its song "Fire"

=== Albums ===
- Blaze (Lagwagon album), 2003
- Blaze (Herman's Hermits album)

=== Songs ===
- "Blaze" (song), a 2008 single by J-pop singer Kotoko
- "Blaze", a single by Japanese singer Kinya Kotani
- "Blaze", the debut single of Korean rock band Rolling Quartz

== Other media ==
- Blaze (novel), a 2007 novel by Stephen King writing as Richard Bachman
- Blaze (toy), a rocking-horse riding toy produced by Mattel in the 1960s

== Sports and games ==
=== Mascots ===
- Blaze (UAB mascot), the dragon mascot of the University of Alabama at Birmingham athletic teams
- Blaze (Paralympic mascot), the phoenix mascot of the 1996 Summer Paralympics
- Blaze the Trail Cat, mascot of the Portland Trail Blazers professional basketball team
- Blaze the Vulcan, the mascot of the Pennsylvania Western University, California Vulcans

=== Teams ===
- Coventry Blaze, an ice hockey team in England, known as Solihull Blaze before relocation to Coventry
- Gold Coast Blaze, an Australian basketball team based in Queensland
- The Blaze (women's cricket), an English women's cricket team based in the East Midlands, formerly known as Lightning (from Loughborough Lightning)

==== United States ====
- Atlanta Blaze, a former Major League Lacrosse team based in Atlanta, Georgia
- Bakersfield Blaze, a former minor league baseball team in Bakersfield, California
- Baton Rouge Blaze, a former team in the arenafootball2 league who played their home games in Baton Rouge, Louisiana
- Bloomington Blaze, former name of the Bloomington Thunder (SPHL), a Southern Professional Hockey League team based in Bloomington, Illinois
- Chicago Blaze (basketball), a National Women's Basketball League team from 2002 to 2005
- Chicago Blaze (ice hockey), an All American Hockey League team in 2008-09
- Chicago Blaze (rugby), a rugby union club founded in 1982
- Indiana Blaze, a former W-League women's soccer team based in Indianapolis, Indiana
- Utah Blaze, an Arena Football League team based in Salt Lake City

=== Other sports and games ===
- Blaze (dinghy), a high-performance racing dinghy designed by Ian Howlett and John Caig
- Blaze, a non-standard poker hand

== Businesses ==
- Blaze (British and Irish TV channel), a television channel
- Blaze Pizza, an American pizza chain

== Places ==
- Blaze, Kentucky, US, an unincorporated community
- Blaze Island, Nunavut, Canada
- Blaze Mountain, a summit in Montana, US

== People ==
- Blaze (given name), a list of people with the name
- Blaze (surname), a list of people with the name

=== Stage name ===
- Blaze Bayley, stage name of English singer and former Wolfsbane and Iron Maiden vocalist Bayley Alexander Cooke (born 1963)
- Blaze Foley, stage name of American country singer and songwriter Michael David Fuller (1949–1989)
- Blaze Starr, stage name of American stripper and burlesque artist Fannie Belle Fleming (1932–2015)
- Blaze Ya Dead Homie, also known simply as Blaze, American rapper Chris Rouleau (born 1976)
- Bobby Blaze, a ring name of American professional wrestler Robert Smedley (born 1963)
- Johnny Blaze, a ring name, along with John Morrison, of American professional wrestler John Randall Hennigan (born 1979)
- Johnny Blaze, a stage name, along with Method Man, of American rapper, songwriter, record producer and actor Clifford Smith, Jr.(born 1971)

== Fictional entities ==
- Ghost Rider (Johnny Blaze), the second Marvel Comics Ghost Rider
- Blaze (Mortal Kombat), a character from the Mortal Kombat video game series
- Blaze the Cat, a pyrokinetic princess cat from the Sonic the Hedgehog video game series
- Blaze and Satanus, comic book villains from DC Comics, enemies of Superman and Captain Marvel
- Blaze Fielding, a character from the Streets of Rage video game series
- Blaze, the title Red Monster Truck character of Blaze and the Monster Machines, a 2014 Nickelodeon cartoon
- Blaze, a horse featured in a series of children's books by C.W. Anderson
- Blaze, a firefly in Tinker Bell and the Lost Treasure
- Blaze, the player character's callsign in the video game Ace Combat 5
- Blaze Manoukian, a character from Toy Story 5
- Blaze, Method Man's nickname in the video game Def Jam: Fight for NY

== Other uses ==
- Blaze (horse marking), an equine coat marking
- Blaze (software), a tool to automate software building and testing
- Blaze, a C++ math library
- Trail blazing, the practice of marking outdoor paths with signs called "blazes"

== See also ==
- The Blaze (disambiguation)
- Alundra Blayze, later stage name for former female professional wrestler Debrah Miceli (born 1964), also known as Madusa
- Sonny Blayze, former manager of professional wrestling tag-team The Powers of Pain
- Blaaze (born 1975), Indian rapper and playback singer
- Blaise (disambiguation)
- Blazer (disambiguation)
- Blazing (disambiguation)
- Johnny Blaze (disambiguation)
