= Blaize =

Blaize may refer to:

- Blaize (given name), a given name
- Blaize (surname), a surname

== See also ==
- Blaise (disambiguation)
- Blaizer (disambiguation)
- Blaze (disambiguation)
