= Lake Der-Chantecoq =

Lake Der-Chantecoq Lac du Der-Chantecoq
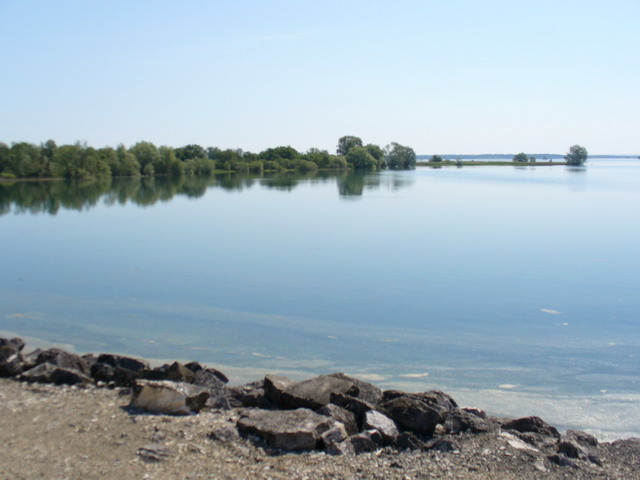

- Location within Grand Est
- Location: Champagne-Ardenne
- Coordinates: 48°34′57″N 4°45′33″E
- Type: artificial lake
- Primary inflows: Marne
- Primary outflows: Marne
- Catchment area: 2,900 km^{2} (1,100 sq mi)
- Basin countries: France
- Surface area: 48 km^{2} (19 sq mi)
- Max. depth: 15 m (49 ft)
- Water volume: 350 hm^{3} (280,000 acre⋅ft)
- Settlements: Sainte-Marie-du-Lac-Nuisement, Giffaumont-Champaubert

Lake Der-Chantecoq (French: Lac du Der-Chantecoq, pronounced [lak dy dɛʁ ʃɑ̃tkɔk]) is situated close to the commune of Saint-Dizier in the departments of Marne and Haute-Marne. It is the largest artificial lake in France, covering 48 km^{2} (19 sq mi) with 350 million m³ of water. The lake is named after the Der plain, in which it is located, and the submerged village Chantecoq.

The lake is fed by a 12 km long canal that branches off the river Marne in Saint-Dizier. The outflow of the lake is a canal that joins the Marne in Arrigny, 20 km downstream of Saint-Dizier. The lake is located in the communes (clockwise starting from the north) Sainte-Marie-du-Lac-Nuisement, Éclaron-Braucourt-Sainte-Livière, Giffaumont-Champaubert, Arrigny, Larzicourt and Écollemont.

== History ==
It was created in 1974 to hold the water of the river Marne so that flooding of the Seine at Paris would stop. It is managed by EPTB Seine Grands Lacs. Its construction required the destruction of three villages; Chantecoq (Marne), Champaubert-aux-Bois and Nuisement-aux-Bois.

Today, many water sports are popular here, including sailing, water skiing, jet-ski, wind surfing, fishing, rowing etc. as well as walking, rollerblading and cycling around its edges.

== Flora and fauna ==
The combination of deep water, islands, and freshwater marshes make the area ideal for waterfowl, most notably the common crane. Each spring and autumn, tens of thousands of cranes assemble here in their migration between wintering grounds to the south and breeding sites in northern Europe. Other birds recorded in the area include white-tailed eagle, great egret, and various geese, ducks, loons (divers), and grebes. The surrounding area is rural, a region of farmland and forest.

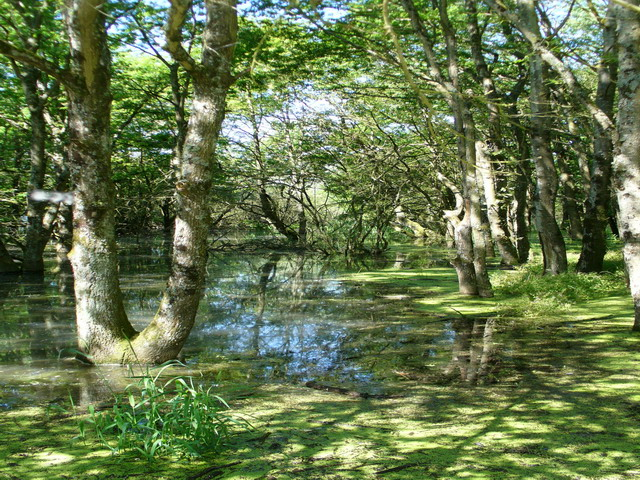
Lake Der-Chantecoq

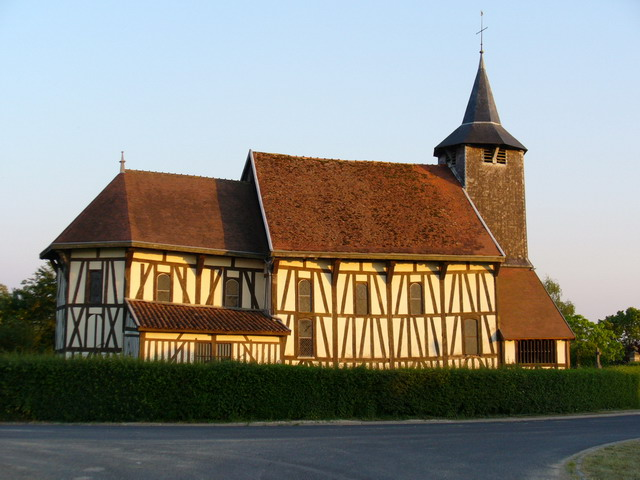
A church at Châtillon-sur-Broué

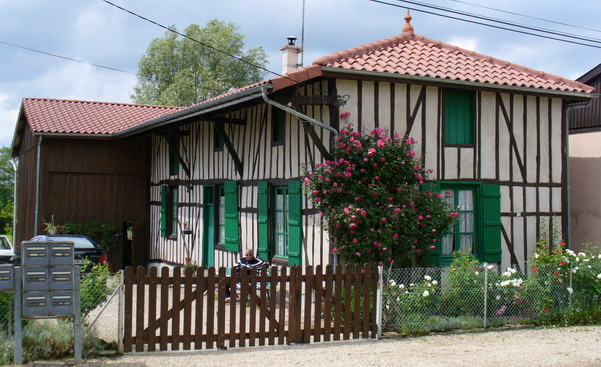
A house at Châtillon-sur-Broué
