= Landricourt =

Landricourt may refer to the following places in France:

- Landricourt, Aisne, a commune in the department of Aisne
- Landricourt, Marne, a commune in the department of Marne
