= Canton of Saint-Dizier-1 =

Coordinates: 48.63°N 4.93°E

The canton of Saint-Dizier-1 is an administrative division of the Haute-Marne department, northeastern France. It was created at the French canton reorganisation which came into effect in March 2015. Its seat is in Saint-Dizier.

It consists of the following communes:

1. Allichamps
2. Éclaron-Braucourt-Sainte-Livière
3. Hallignicourt
4. Humbécourt
5. Laneuville-au-Pont
6. Louvemont
7. Moëslains
8. Perthes
9. Saint-Dizier (partly)
10. Valcourt
11. Villiers-en-Lieu
