= The Blaze (disambiguation) =

TheBlaze is an American news and entertainment company founded by Glenn Beck.

The Blaze may also refer to:

== Radio stations ==
- KASC (AM) (1330 AM, "The Blaze 1330 AM"), the student-operated radio station of Arizona State University in Tempe, Arizona
- KBAZ (96.3 FM, "The Blaze"), a commercial radio station in Hamilton, Montana
- KIBZ (104.1 FM, "The Blaze"), a commercial radio station in Lincoln, Nebraska
- KZNS-FM (97.5 FM, "The Blaze"), a commercial radio station in Coalville, Utah
- Simulcast on KUDD (105.1 FM) in Manti, Utah
- WKSC-FM (103.5 FM), a radio station in Chicago, Illinois, formerly branded as "The Blaze" from 1991 to 1994
- KKBZ (105.1 FM, "The Blaze"), a radio station in Fresno, California

== Sports ==
- Carol Blazejowski (born 1956), American professional basketball executive and retired player nicknamed "The Blaze"
- The Blaze (women's cricket), an English women's cricket team

== Other uses ==
- The Blaze (band), a French electronica duo
- TheBlaze (magazine), an American magazine

== See also ==
- Blaze (disambiguation)
