= Hauteville, Marne =

Hauteville
- Commune
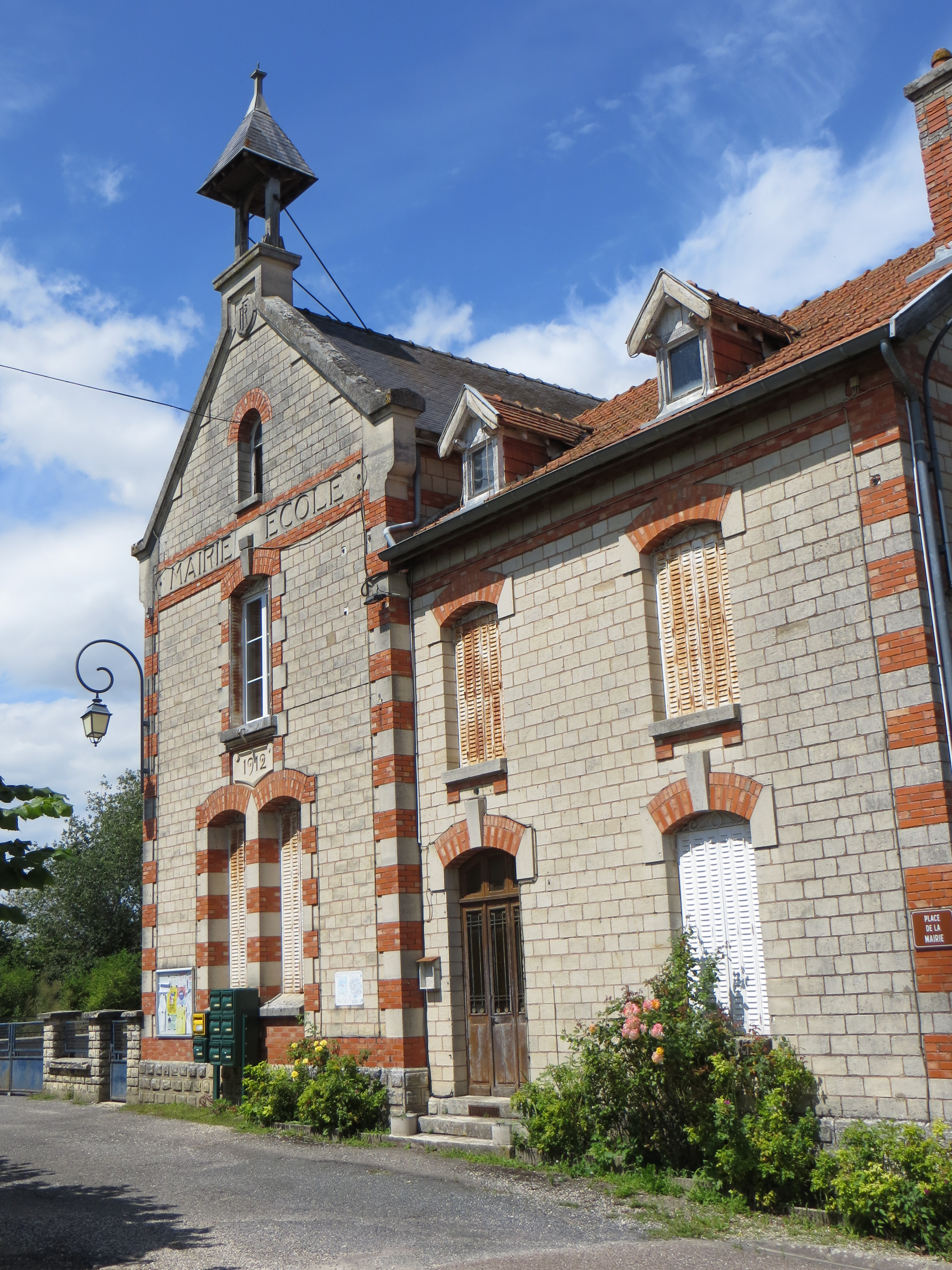
- Town hall
- Location of Hauteville
- Location within France Location within Grand Est
- Coordinates: 48°38′17″N 4°46′16″E
- Country: France
- Region: Grand Est
- Department: Marne
- Arrondissement: Vitry-le-François
- Canton: Sermaize-les-Bains
- Intercommunality: CA Grand Saint-Dizier, Der et Vallées

Government
  - Mayor (2020–2026): Olivier Caron
- Area^{1}: 10.78 km^{2} (4.16 sq mi)
- Elevation: 143 m (469 ft)
- Population (2023): 230
  - Density: 21/km^{2} (55/sq mi)
- Time zone: UTC+01:00 (CET)
  - Summer (DST): UTC+02:00 (CEST)
- INSEE/Postal code: 51286 /51290
- ^{1} French Land Register data, which excludes lakes, ponds, glaciers > 1 km^{2} (0.386 sq mi or 247 acres) and river estuaries.

Hauteville (French pronunciation: [otvil]) is a commune in the Marne department in north-eastern France.

== Geography ==
The river Blaise flows through the commune.

== See also ==
- Communes of the Marne department
