= Allichamps =

- Commune
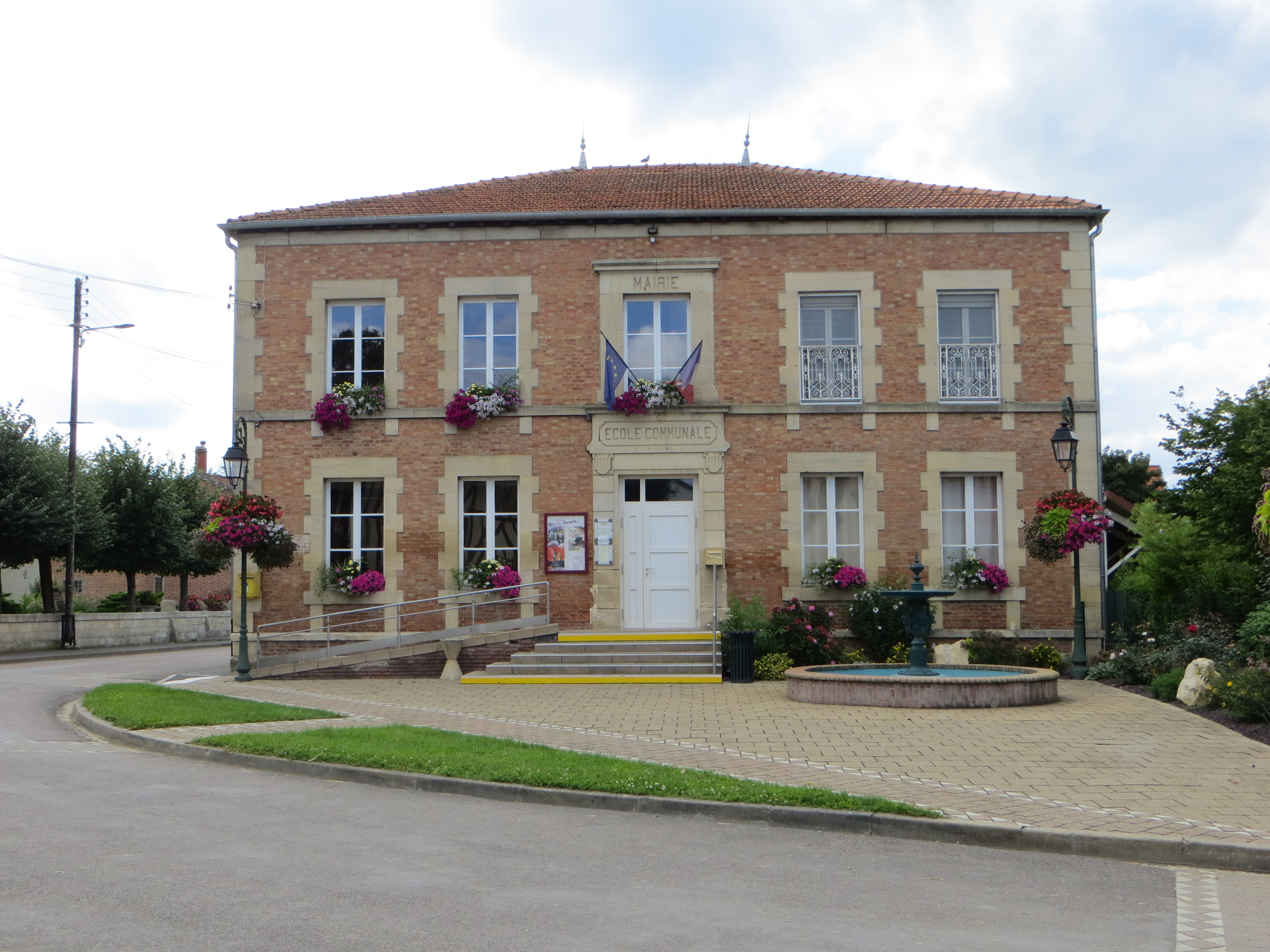
- Town hall
- Location of Allichamps
- Location within France Location within Grand Est
- Coordinates: 48°33′43″N 4°53′40″E
- Country: France
- Region: Grand Est
- Department: Haute-Marne
- Arrondissement: Saint-Dizier
- Canton: Saint-Dizier-1
- Intercommunality: CA Grand Saint-Dizier, Der et Vallées

Government
  - Mayor (2020–2026): Pascale Bellier
- Area^{1}: 2.74 km^{2} (1.06 sq mi)
- Elevation: 141 m (463 ft)
- Highest elevation: 165 m (541 ft)
- Lowest elevation: 137 m (449 ft)
- Population (2023): 348
  - Density: 127/km^{2} (329/sq mi)
- Time zone: UTC+01:00 (CET)
  - Summer (DST): UTC+02:00 (CEST)
- INSEE/Postal code: 52006 /52130
- ^{1} French Land Register data, which excludes lakes, ponds, glaciers > 1 km^{2} (0.386 sq mi or 247 acres) and river estuaries.

Allichamps (French pronunciation: [aliʃɑ̃]) is a commune in the Haute-Marne department in the Grand Est region in northeastern France.

== Geography ==
The river Blaise flows through the commune.

== Population ==
Historical population
Year	Pop.	±% p.a.
1968	417	—
1975	409	−0.28%
1982	453	+1.47%
1990	382	−2.11%
1999	371	−0.32%
2007	384	+0.43%
2012	385	+0.05%
2017	347	−2.06%
2023	348	+0.05%
Source: INSEE

== See also ==
- Communes of the Haute-Marne department
