= Hallignicourt =

- Commune
- Location of Hallignicourt
- Location within France Location within Grand Est
- Coordinates: 48°38′37″N 4°52′16″E
- Country: France
- Region: Grand Est
- Department: Haute-Marne
- Arrondissement: Saint-Dizier
- Canton: Saint-Dizier-1
- Intercommunality: CA Grand Saint-Dizier, Der et Vallées

Government
  - Mayor (2020–2026): Marie-Annick Landréa
- Area^{1}: 11.86 km^{2} (4.58 sq mi)
- Elevation: 132 m (433 ft)
- Highest elevation: 141 m (463 ft)
- Lowest elevation: 124 m (407 ft)
- Population (2023): 238
  - Density: 20.1/km^{2} (52.0/sq mi)
- Time zone: UTC+01:00 (CET)
  - Summer (DST): UTC+02:00 (CEST)
- INSEE/Postal code: 52235 /52100
- ^{1} French Land Register data, which excludes lakes, ponds, glaciers > 1 km^{2} (0.386 sq mi or 247 acres) and river estuaries.

Hallignicourt (French pronunciation: [aliɲikuʁ]) is a commune in the Haute-Marne department in north-eastern France.

== See also ==
- Communes of the Haute-Marne department
