= Humbécourt =

- Commune
- Coat of arms
- Location of Humbécourt
- Location within France Location within Grand Est
- Coordinates: 48°35′01″N 4°54′08″E
- Country: France
- Region: Grand Est
- Department: Haute-Marne
- Arrondissement: Saint-Dizier
- Canton: Saint-Dizier-1
- Intercommunality: CA Grand Saint-Dizier, Der et Vallées

Government
  - Mayor (2020–2026): Philippe Novac
- Area^{1}: 20.84 km^{2} (8.05 sq mi)
- Elevation: 141 m (463 ft)
- Highest elevation: 178 m (584 ft)
- Lowest elevation: 136 m (446 ft)
- Population (2023): 761
  - Density: 36.5/km^{2} (94.6/sq mi)
- Time zone: UTC+01:00 (CET)
  - Summer (DST): UTC+02:00 (CEST)
- INSEE/Postal code: 52244 /52290
- ^{1} French Land Register data, which excludes lakes, ponds, glaciers > 1 km^{2} (0.386 sq mi or 247 acres) and river estuaries.

Humbécourt (French pronunciation: [œ̃bekuʁ]) is a commune in the Haute-Marne department in north-eastern France.

== Geography ==
The river Blaise flows through the commune.

== See also ==
- Communes of the Haute-Marne department
