= Valcourt, Haute-Marne =

Valcourt
- Commune
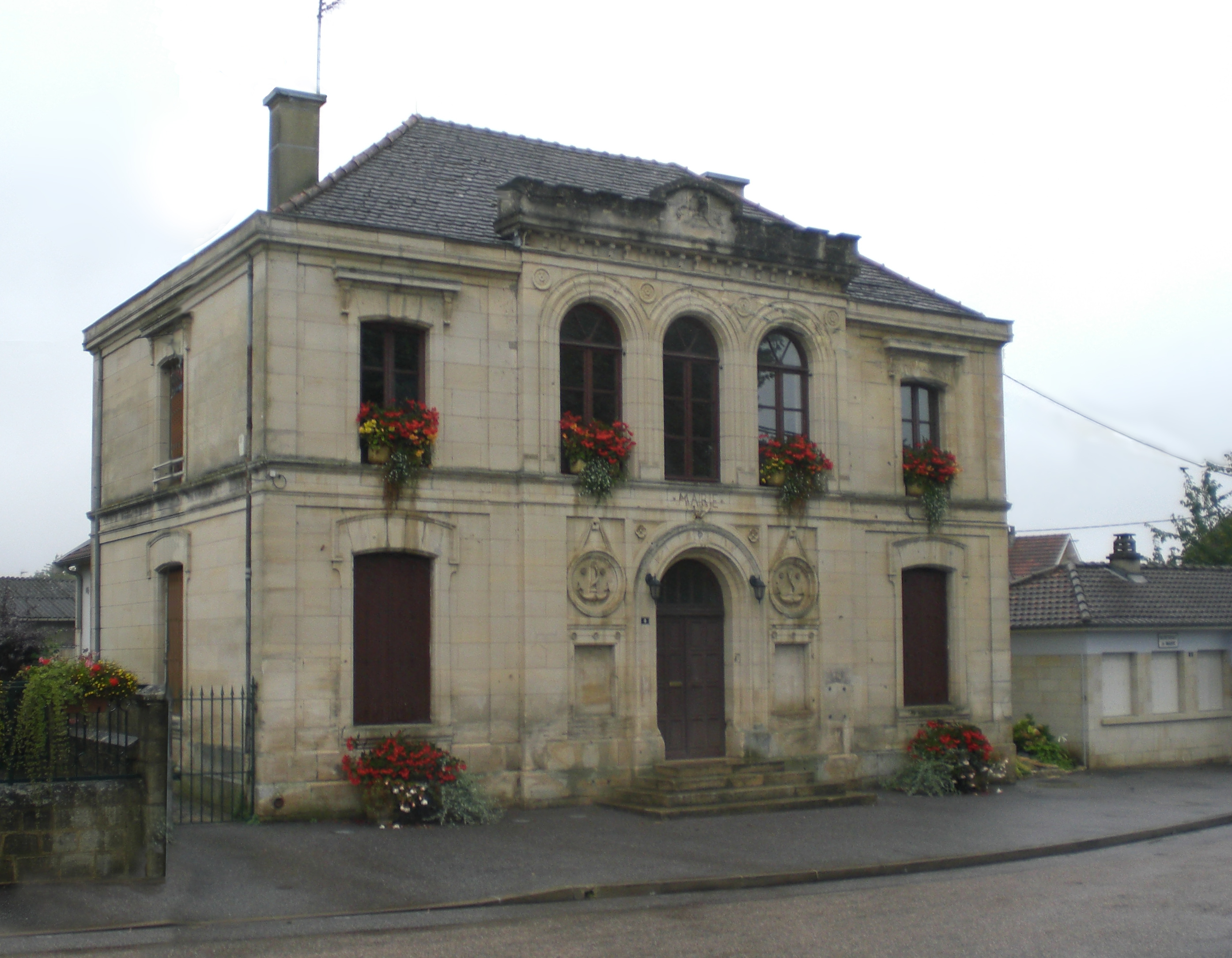
- The town hall in Valcourt

- Coat of arms
- Location of Valcourt
- Location within France Location within Grand Est
- Coordinates: 48°37′01″N 4°54′19″E
- Country: France
- Region: Grand Est
- Department: Haute-Marne
- Arrondissement: Saint-Dizier
- Canton: Saint-Dizier-1
- Intercommunality: CA Grand Saint-Dizier, Der et Vallées

Government
  - Mayor (2020–2026): Jean-Marc Lasson
- Area^{1}: 3.77 km^{2} (1.46 sq mi)
- Elevation: 134 m (440 ft)
- Highest elevation: 178 m (584 ft)
- Lowest elevation: 128 m (420 ft)
- Population (2023): 596
  - Density: 158/km^{2} (409/sq mi)
- Time zone: UTC+01:00 (CET)
  - Summer (DST): UTC+02:00 (CEST)
- INSEE/Postal code: 52500 /52100
- ^{1} French Land Register data, which excludes lakes, ponds, glaciers > 1 km^{2} (0.386 sq mi or 247 acres) and river estuaries.

Valcourt (French pronunciation: [valkuʁ]) is a commune in the Haute-Marne department in north-eastern France.

== See also ==
- Communes of the Haute-Marne department
