= Lachapelle-en-Blaisy =

- Commune
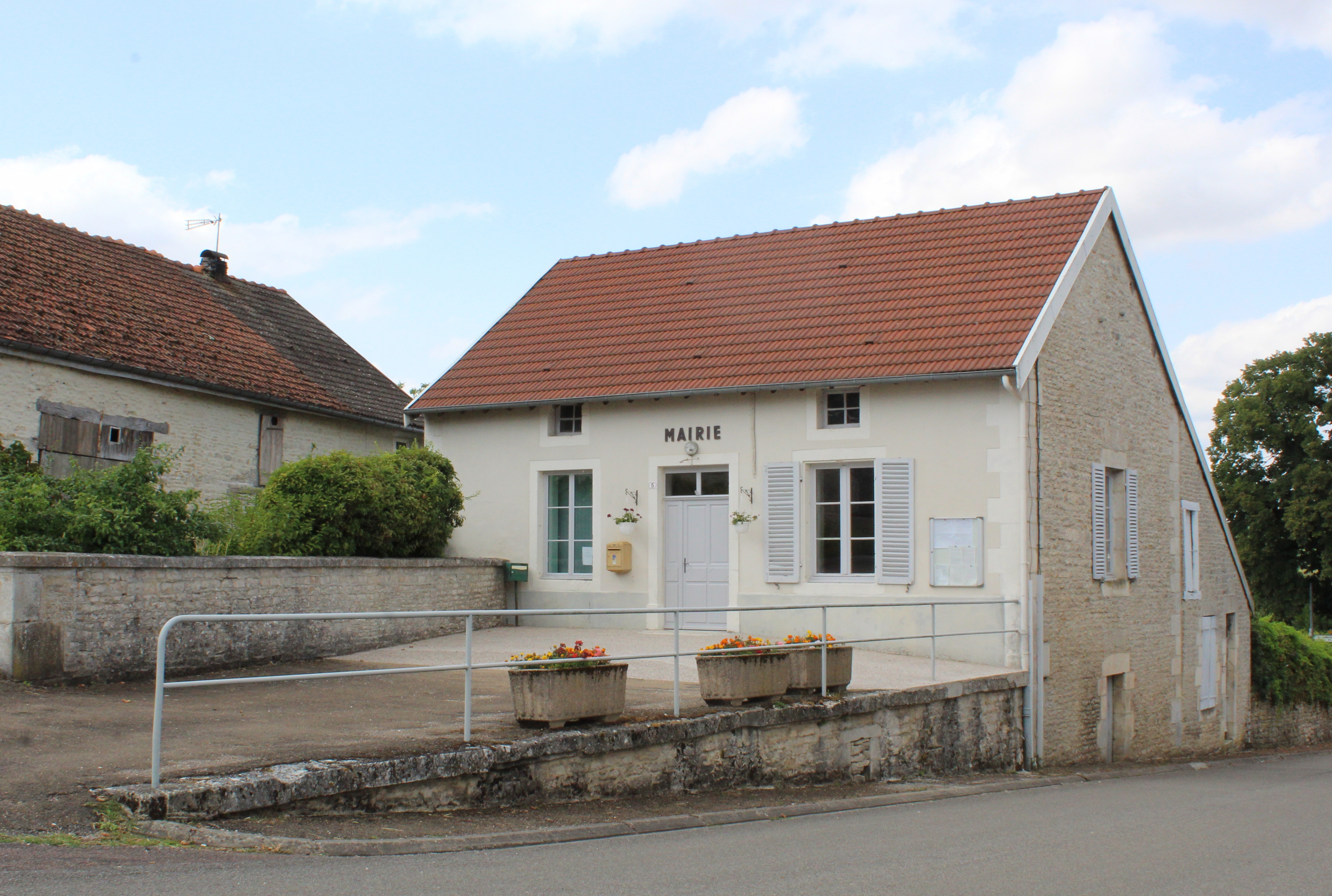
- The town hall in Lachapelle-en-Blaisy
- Location of Lachapelle-en-Blaisy
- Location within France Location within Grand Est
- Coordinates: 48°12′06″N 4°58′05″E
- Country: France
- Region: Grand Est
- Department: Haute-Marne
- Arrondissement: Chaumont
- Canton: Châteauvillain
- Intercommunality: CA Chaumont

Government
  - Mayor (2020–2026): Michel Menet
- Area^{1}: 16.53 km^{2} (6.38 sq mi)
- Elevation: 280 m (920 ft)
- Population (2023): 81
  - Density: 4.9/km^{2} (13/sq mi)
- Time zone: UTC+01:00 (CET)
  - Summer (DST): UTC+02:00 (CEST)
- INSEE/Postal code: 52254 /52330
- ^{1} French Land Register data, which excludes lakes, ponds, glaciers > 1 km^{2} (0.386 sq mi or 247 acres) and river estuaries.

Lachapelle-en-Blaisy (French pronunciation: [laʃapɛl ɑ̃ blɛzi]) is a commune in the Haute-Marne department in north-eastern France.

== Geography ==
The river Blaise flows through the commune.

== See also ==
- Communes of the Haute-Marne department
