= Gillancourt =

- Commune
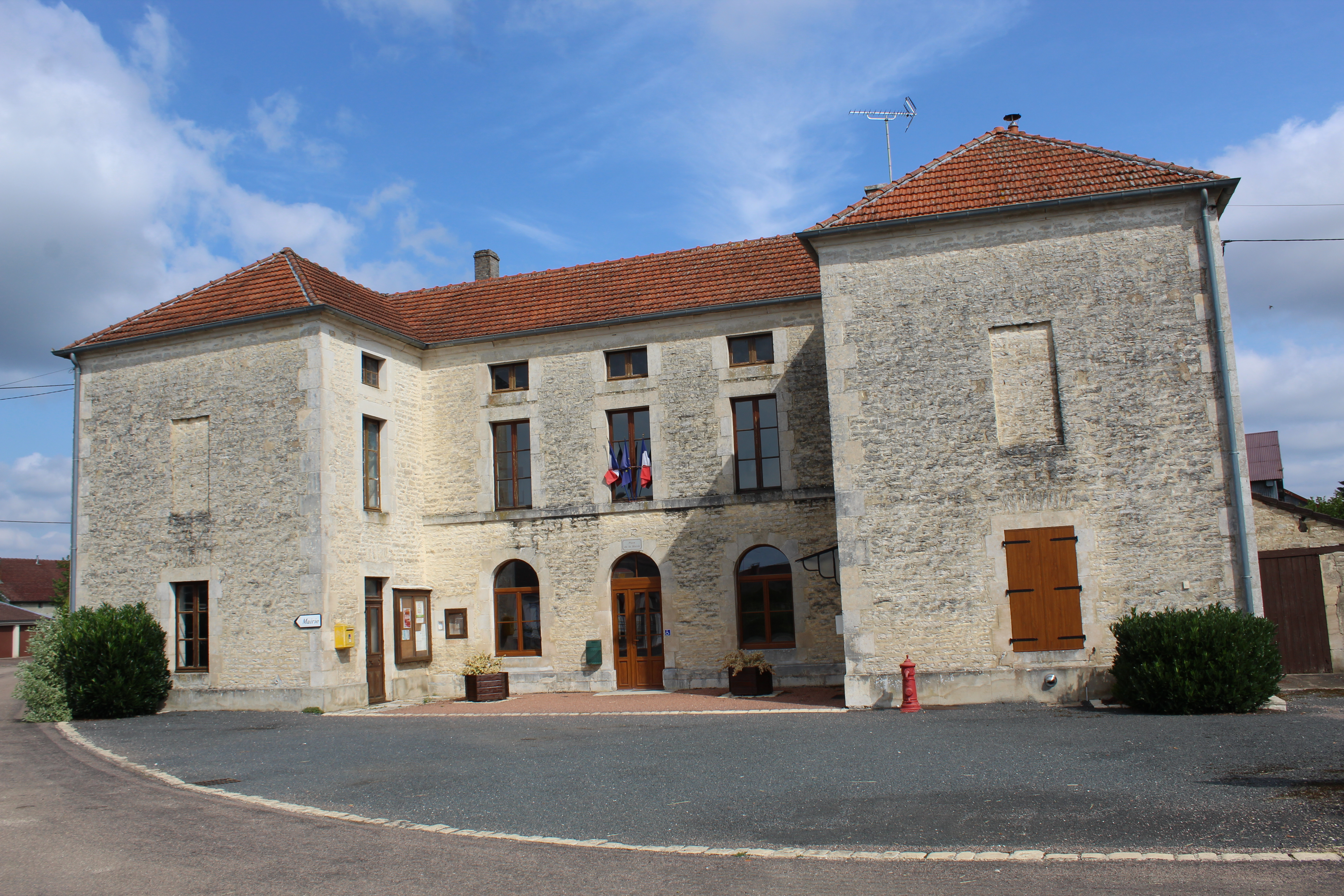
- The town hall in Gillancourt
- Location of Gillancourt
- Location within France Location within Grand Est
- Coordinates: 48°09′42″N 4°59′35″E
- Country: France
- Region: Grand Est
- Department: Haute-Marne
- Arrondissement: Chaumont
- Canton: Châteauvillain
- Intercommunality: CA Chaumont

Government
  - Mayor (2020–2026): Damien Bonhomme
- Area^{1}: 15.09 km^{2} (5.83 sq mi)
- Elevation: 328 m (1,076 ft)
- Population (2023): 130
  - Density: 8.6/km^{2} (22/sq mi)
- Time zone: UTC+01:00 (CET)
  - Summer (DST): UTC+02:00 (CEST)
- INSEE/Postal code: 52221 /52330
- ^{1} French Land Register data, which excludes lakes, ponds, glaciers > 1 km^{2} (0.386 sq mi or 247 acres) and river estuaries.

Gillancourt (French pronunciation: [ʒijɑ̃kuʁ]) is a commune in the Haute-Marne department in north-eastern France.

== Geography ==
The river Blaise has its source in the village.

== See also ==
- Communes of the Haute-Marne department
