= Louvemont =

- Commune
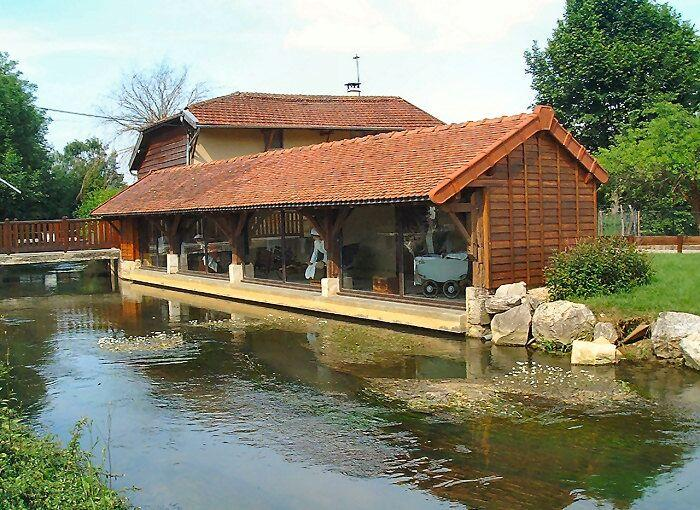
- The wash house in Louvemont
- Location of Louvemont
- Location within France Location within Grand Est
- Coordinates: 48°33′07″N 4°54′36″E
- Country: France
- Region: Grand Est
- Department: Haute-Marne
- Arrondissement: Saint-Dizier
- Canton: Saint-Dizier-1
- Intercommunality: CA Grand Saint-Dizier, Der et Vallées

Government
  - Mayor (2020–2026): Jacques Delmotte
- Area^{1}: 20.98 km^{2} (8.10 sq mi)
- Elevation: 148 m (486 ft)
- Highest elevation: 197 m (646 ft)
- Lowest elevation: 139 m (456 ft)
- Population (2023): 694
  - Density: 33.1/km^{2} (85.7/sq mi)
- Time zone: UTC+01:00 (CET)
  - Summer (DST): UTC+02:00 (CEST)
- INSEE/Postal code: 52294 /52130
- ^{1} French Land Register data, which excludes lakes, ponds, glaciers > 1 km^{2} (0.386 sq mi or 247 acres) and river estuaries.

Louvemont (French pronunciation: [luvmɔ̃]) is a commune in the Haute-Marne department in north-eastern France.

== Geography ==
The river Blaise flows through the commune.

== See also ==
- Communes of the Haute-Marne department
