= Curmont =

- Commune
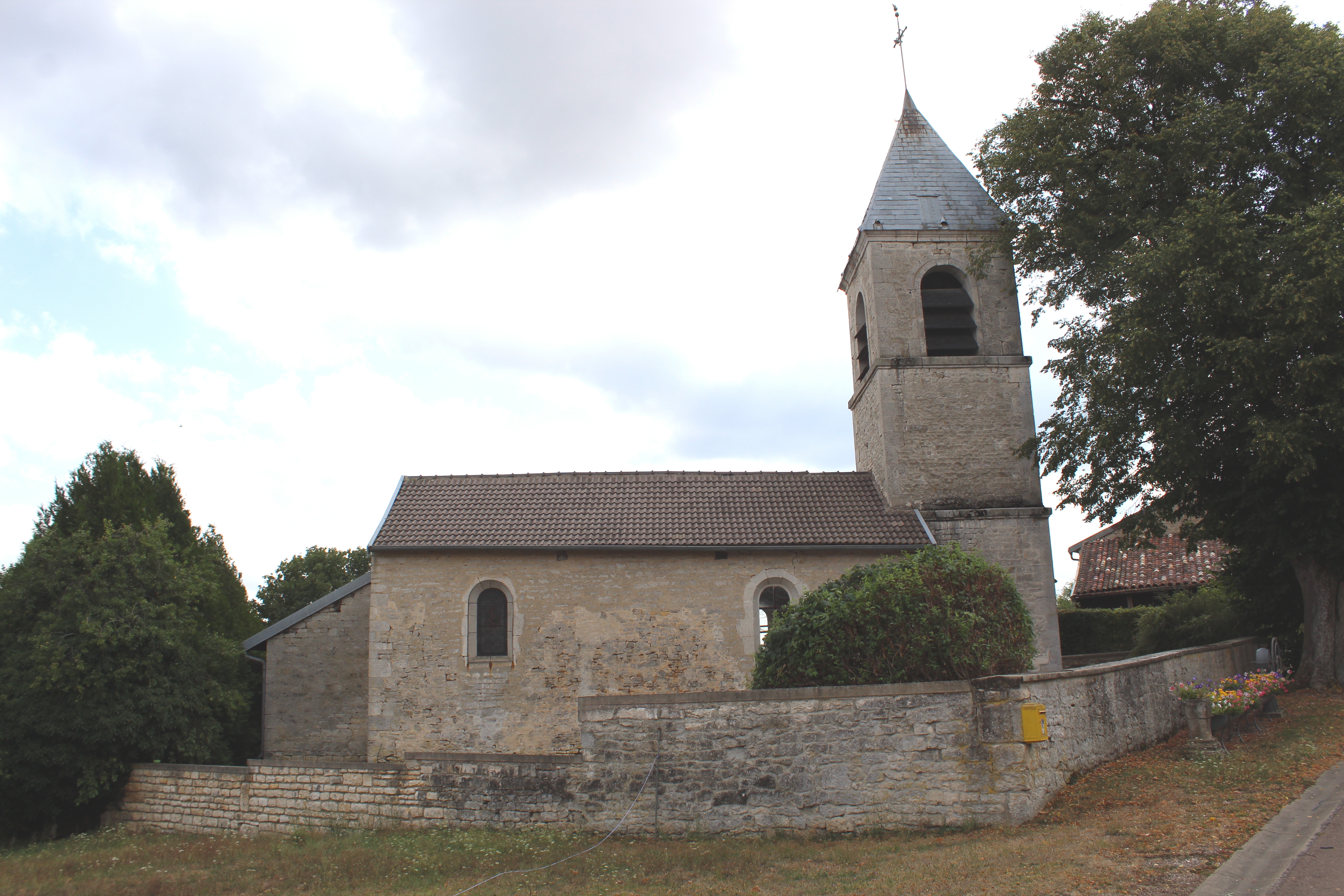
- The church in Curmont
- Location of Curmont
- Location within France Location within Grand Est
- Coordinates: 48°15′37″N 4°57′18″E
- Country: France
- Region: Grand Est
- Department: Haute-Marne
- Arrondissement: Chaumont
- Canton: Châteauvillain
- Intercommunality: CA Chaumont

Government
  - Mayor (2020–2026): Jean Masson
- Area^{1}: 2.94 km^{2} (1.14 sq mi)
- Elevation: 270 m (890 ft)
- Population (2023): 12
  - Density: 4.1/km^{2} (11/sq mi)
- Demonym(s): Curmontais, Curmontaises
- Time zone: UTC+01:00 (CET)
  - Summer (DST): UTC+02:00 (CEST)
- INSEE/Postal code: 52157 /52330
- ^{1} French Land Register data, which excludes lakes, ponds, glaciers > 1 km^{2} (0.386 sq mi or 247 acres) and river estuaries.

Curmont (French pronunciation: [kyʁmɔ̃]) is a commune in the Haute-Marne department in north-eastern France.

== Geography ==
The river Blaise flows through the commune.

== Population ==
Historical population
Year	Pop.	±% p.a.
1968	17	—
1975	18	+0.82%
1982	17	−0.81%
1990	13	−3.30%
1999	11	−1.84%
2007	16	+4.80%
2012	14	−2.64%
2017	12	−3.04%
2023	12	+0.00%
Source: INSEE

== See also ==
- Communes of the Haute-Marne department
