= Blasius =

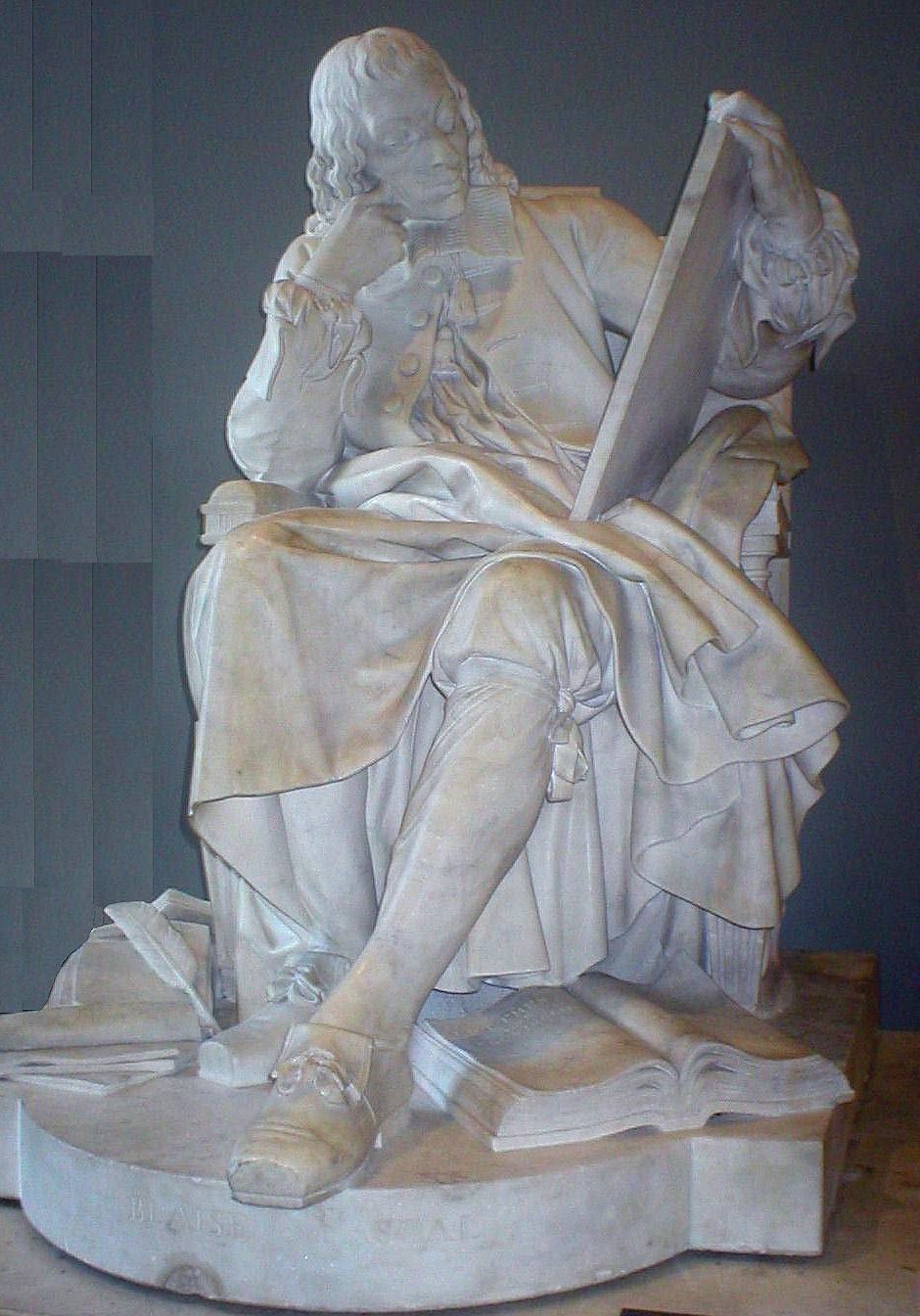
Blaise Pascal (1623–1662)

Blasius may refer to:

- various saints, including Saint Blaise (the French form of Blasius)
- August Wilhelm Heinrich Blasius (1845–1912), German ornithologist
- Blasius of Parma (c. 1345–1416), natural philosopher, born in Parma
- Frédéric Blasius (1758–1829), French opera composer and conductor
- Gerard Blasius (1627–1682), Dutch anatomist
- Heinrich Wilhelm Blasius (1818–1899), German meteorologist
- Joan Blasius (1639–1672), Dutch playwright, Gerhard's younger brother
- Johann Heinrich Blasius (1809–1870), German zoologist
- Jörg Blasius (born 1957), German sociologist
- Paul Richard Heinrich Blasius (1883–1970), German physicist
- Rudolf Blasius (1842–1907), German physician, bacteriologist, naturalist and ornithologist

== See also ==
- Blaise (disambiguation)
- Saint Blaise (disambiguation)
- Blasius boundary layer
