= Elzéar Auguste Cousin de Dommartin =

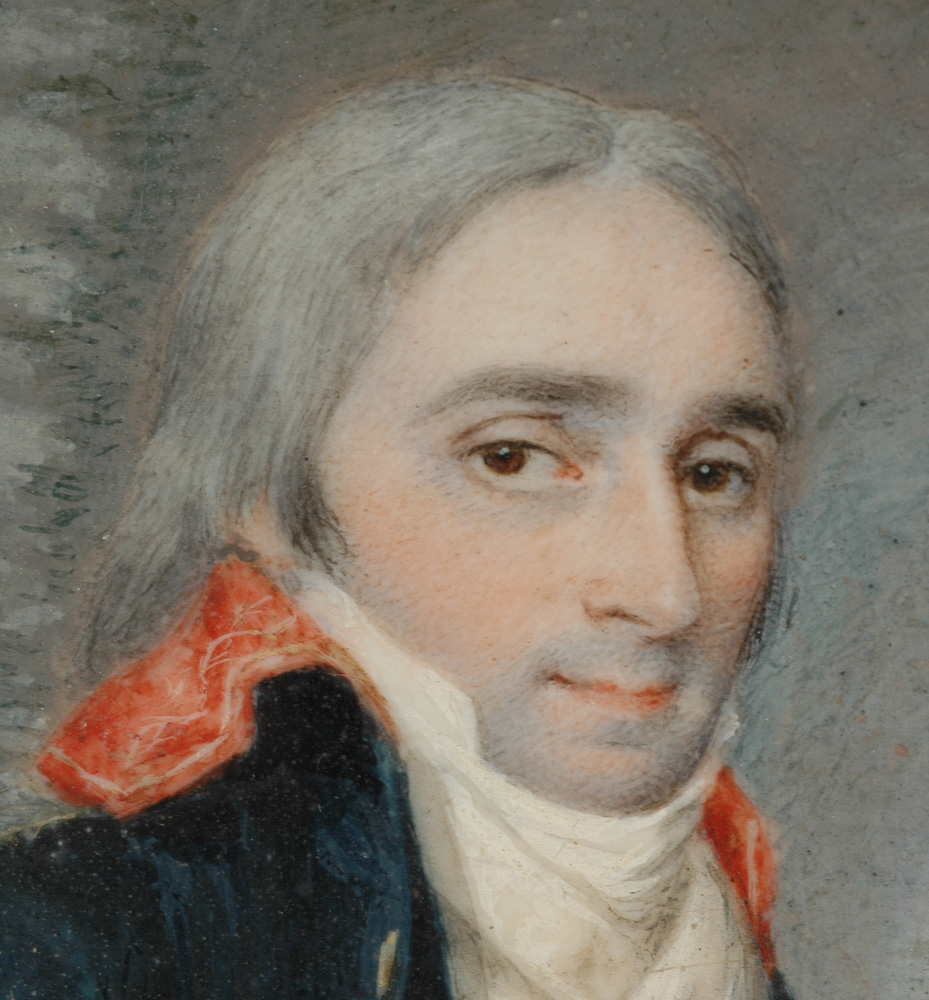
- Born: 1768; Dommartin-le-Franc
- Died: 1799 (aged 30–31); Rosetta, Ottoman Egypt
- Military career
- Allegiance: Kingdom of France, French Republic / Directory
- Branch: Artillery
- Service years: 1785-1799
- Rank: acting général de division
- Conflicts: French Revolutionary Wars; Siege of Toulon; Second Battle of Dego; Battle of Mondovì; Battle of Rovereto; Egyptian Campaign

Elzéar Auguste Cousin de Dommartin (French pronunciation: [ɛlze.aʁ oɡyst kuzɛ̃ də dɔmaʁtɛ̃]; 26 May 1768 in Dommartin-le-Franc – 9 August 1799 in Rosetta) became a French general during the French Revolutionary Wars, fought in Italy under Napoleon Bonaparte, and commanded the artillery division of the Armée d'Orient during the French invasion of Egypt in 1798.

== Life ==
Dommartin received his first commission in 1785, serving as a captain of the artillery. Seriously wounded during the siege of Avignon, he was unable to take up his appointment as artillery commander at the Siege of Toulon in 1793. Therefore, an ambitious young artillery captain named Napoleon Bonaparte assumed command of the French artillery, with notable success. Dommartin then served in the Army of Italy. During the Montenotte Campaign, he led a brigade in the Second Battle of Dego and in the Battle of Mondovì. Later, he commanded the artillery at the Battle of Rovereto.

Dommartin was appointed commander of the artillery of the Rhine in 1797. Bonaparte then chose him in 1798 to command the artillery for the invasion of Egypt as acting general of division. During that campaign, Dommartin organised the Siege of El Arish and the Siege of Acre, but was wounded in a skirmish and died of blood poisoning. His name is engraved on the south side of the Arc de Triomphe.
