= Dommartin-le-Franc =

- Commune
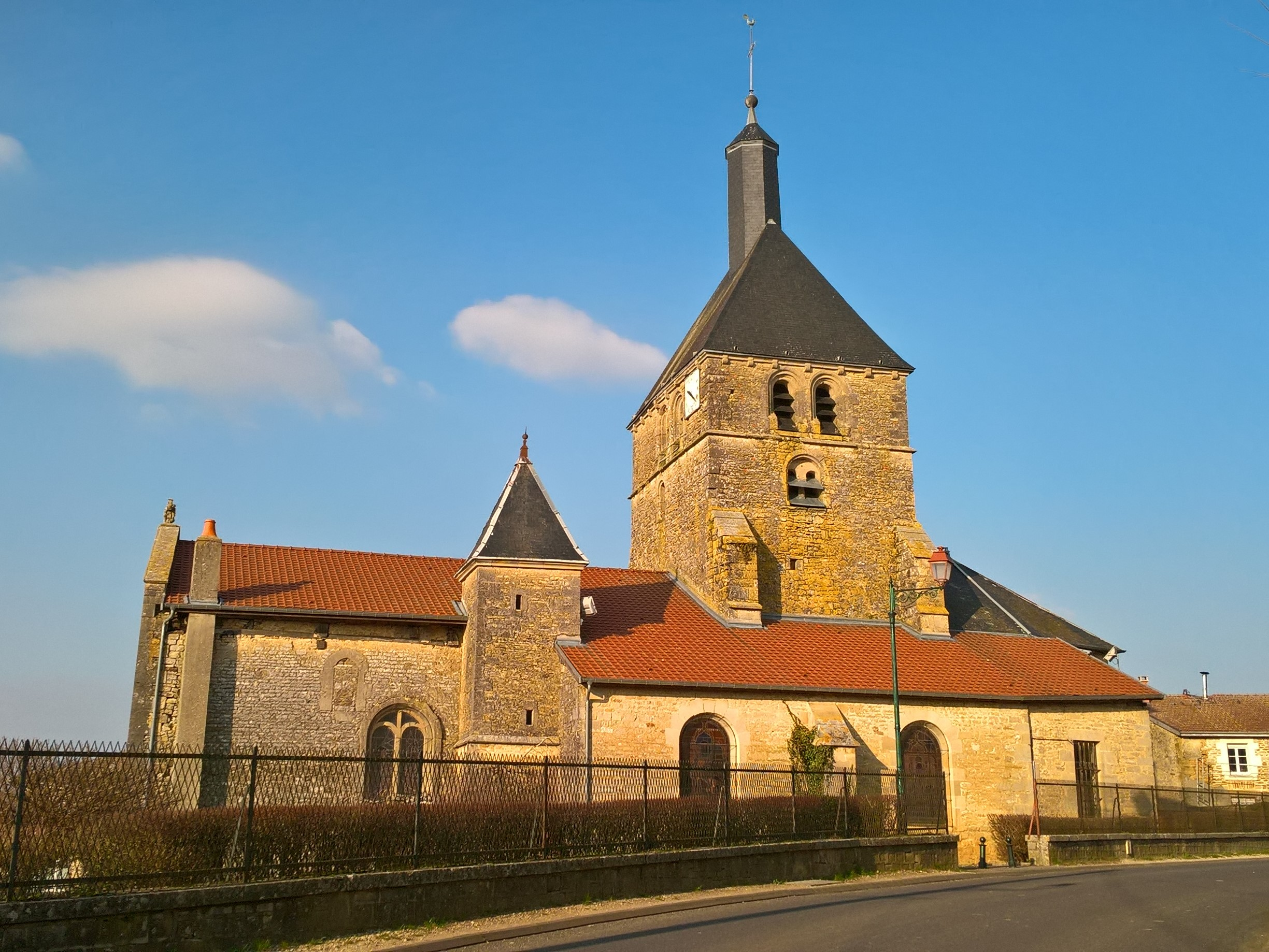
- The church in Dommartin-le-Franc
- Location of Dommartin-le-Franc
- Location within France Location within Grand Est
- Coordinates: 48°25′42″N 4°57′42″E
- Country: France
- Region: Grand Est
- Department: Haute-Marne
- Arrondissement: Saint-Dizier
- Canton: Wassy
- Intercommunality: CA Grand Saint-Dizier, Der et Vallées

Government
  - Mayor (2024–2026): Angélique Fiot Masselot
- Area^{1}: 10.03 km^{2} (3.87 sq mi)
- Elevation: 188 m (617 ft)
- Highest elevation: 279 m (915 ft)
- Lowest elevation: 166 m (545 ft)
- Population (2023): 243
  - Density: 24.2/km^{2} (62.7/sq mi)
- Time zone: UTC+01:00 (CET)
  - Summer (DST): UTC+02:00 (CEST)
- INSEE/Postal code: 52171 /52110
- ^{1} French Land Register data, which excludes lakes, ponds, glaciers > 1 km^{2} (0.386 sq mi or 247 acres) and river estuaries.

Dommartin-le-Franc (French pronunciation: [dɔmaʁtɛ̃ lə fʁɑ̃]) is a commune in the Haute-Marne department in north-eastern France.

== Geography ==
The Blaise flows northward through the middle of the commune and crosses the village.

== Demography ==
Historical population
Year	Pop.	±% p.a.
1968	319	—
1975	333	+0.62%
1982	312	−0.93%
1990	273	−1.66%
1999	258	−0.63%
2007	217	−2.14%
2012	219	+0.18%
2017	248	+2.52%
2023	243	−0.34%
Source: INSEE

== People ==
It is the birthplace of Elzéar Auguste Cousin de Dommartin.

== See also ==
- Communes of the Haute-Marne department
