= Blaisy =

- Commune
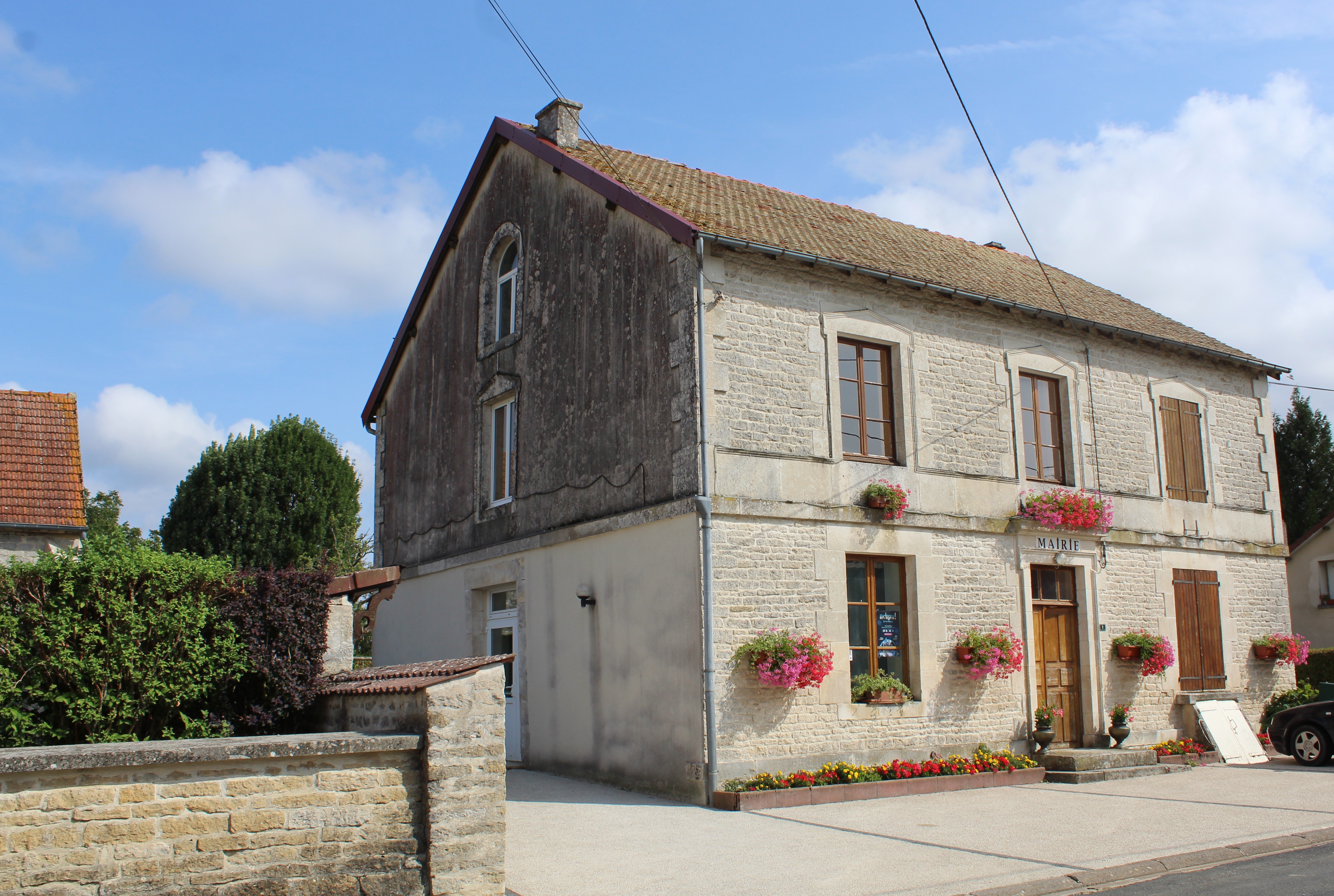
- The town hall in Blaisy
- Location of Blaisy
- Location within France Location within Grand Est
- Coordinates: 48°10′27″N 4°59′50″E
- Country: France
- Region: Grand Est
- Department: Haute-Marne
- Arrondissement: Chaumont
- Canton: Châteauvillain
- Intercommunality: CA Chaumont

Government
  - Mayor (2020–2026): Pierre Delaître
- Area^{1}: 5.62 km^{2} (2.17 sq mi)
- Elevation: 290 m (950 ft)
- Population (2023): 65
  - Density: 12/km^{2} (30/sq mi)
- Time zone: UTC+01:00 (CET)
  - Summer (DST): UTC+02:00 (CEST)
- INSEE/Postal code: 52053 /52330
- ^{1} French Land Register data, which excludes lakes, ponds, glaciers > 1 km^{2} (0.386 sq mi or 247 acres) and river estuaries.

Blaisy (French pronunciation: [blɛzi]) is a commune in the Haute-Marne department in northeastern France.

== Geography ==
The river Blaise flows through the commune.

== Population ==
Historical population
Year	Pop.	±% p.a.
1968	46	—
1975	53	+2.04%
1982	63	+2.50%
1990	73	+1.86%
1999	64	−1.45%
2007	81	+2.99%
2012	78	−0.75%
2017	75	−0.78%
2023	65	−2.36%
Source: INSEE

== See also ==
- Communes of the Haute-Marne department
