= Écollemont =

- Commune
- Coat of arms
- Location of Écollemont
- Location within France Location within Grand Est
- Coordinates: 48°37′18″N 4°44′00″E
- Country: France
- Region: Grand Est
- Department: Marne
- Arrondissement: Vitry-le-François
- Canton: Sermaize-les-Bains
- Intercommunality: Perthois-Bocage et Der

Government
  - Mayor (2020–2026): Albert Chrustowski
- Area^{1}: 2.81 km^{2} (1.08 sq mi)
- Population (2023): 64
  - Density: 23/km^{2} (59/sq mi)
- Time zone: UTC+01:00 (CET)
  - Summer (DST): UTC+02:00 (CEST)
- INSEE/Postal code: 51223 /51290
- ^{1} French Land Register data, which excludes lakes, ponds, glaciers > 1 km^{2} (0.386 sq mi or 247 acres) and river estuaries.

Écollemont (French pronunciation: [ekɔlmɔ̃]) is a commune in the Marne department in north-eastern France.

== Geography ==
The Blaise forms the commune's northern border.

The Lake Der-Chantecoq forms part of the commune's southern border.

== See also ==
- Communes of the Marne department
