= Villiers-en-Lieu =

- Commune
- Coat of arms
- Location of Villiers-en-Lieu
- Location within France Location within Grand Est
- Coordinates: 48°40′04″N 4°54′01″E
- Country: France
- Region: Grand Est
- Department: Haute-Marne
- Arrondissement: Saint-Dizier
- Canton: Saint-Dizier-1
- Intercommunality: CA Grand Saint-Dizier, Der et Vallées

Government
  - Mayor (2020–2026): Eric Bonnemains
- Area^{1}: 12.9 km^{2} (5.0 sq mi)
- Elevation: 138 m (453 ft)
- Highest elevation: 177 m (581 ft)
- Lowest elevation: 133 m (436 ft)
- Population (2023): 1,469
  - Density: 114/km^{2} (295/sq mi)
- Time zone: UTC+01:00 (CET)
  - Summer (DST): UTC+02:00 (CEST)
- INSEE/Postal code: 52534 /52100
- ^{1} French Land Register data, which excludes lakes, ponds, glaciers > 1 km^{2} (0.386 sq mi or 247 acres) and river estuaries.

Villiers-en-Lieu (French pronunciation: [vilje ɑ̃ ljø]) is a commune in the Haute-Marne department in north-eastern France.

== See also ==
- Communes of the Haute-Marne department
