= Laneuville-au-Pont =

- Commune
- Location of Laneuville-au-Pont
- Location within France Location within Grand Est
- Coordinates: 48°37′48″N 4°51′31″E
- Country: France
- Region: Grand Est
- Department: Haute-Marne
- Arrondissement: Saint-Dizier
- Canton: Saint-Dizier-1
- Intercommunality: CA Grand Saint-Dizier, Der et Vallées

Government
  - Mayor (2020–2026): Pierre Bonneaud
- Area^{1}: 4.09 km^{2} (1.58 sq mi)
- Elevation: 150 m (490 ft)
- Highest elevation: 171 m (561 ft)
- Lowest elevation: 123 m (404 ft)
- Population (2023): 233
  - Density: 57.0/km^{2} (148/sq mi)
- Time zone: UTC+01:00 (CET)
  - Summer (DST): UTC+02:00 (CEST)
- INSEE/Postal code: 52267 /52100
- ^{1} French Land Register data, which excludes lakes, ponds, glaciers > 1 km^{2} (0.386 sq mi or 247 acres) and river estuaries.

Laneuville-au-Pont (French pronunciation: [lanøvil o pɔ̃]) is a commune in the Haute-Marne department in north-eastern France.

== See also ==
- Communes of the Haute-Marne department
