= Blaizer =

Blaizer may refer to:

- Blaizer (Chaotic), a fictional character
- Blaizer (composer) (21st century), Swedish music composer

== See also ==
- Blaize (disambiguation)
- Blazer (disambiguation)
