= Blaize (given name) =

Blaize is a given name. Notable people with the name include:

== Men ==
- Blaize Punter (born 1996), British footballer
- Blaize Shiek, American dancer
- Blaize Talagi (born 2005), Samoan international rugby league footballer

=== Middle name ===
- Gilbert Blaize Rego (1921–2012), Indian Roman Catholic bishop

== Women ==
- Blaize Clement (1932–2011), American writer

== See also ==
- Blaise (disambiguation)
- Blaise (name)
