= Saint Blaise (disambiguation) =

Saint Blaise was a physician and bishop of Sebaste, martyred in 316.

Saint Blaise may also refer to:

- Saint Blaise of Amorion (died 908)
- Blaise of Caesarea Cappadociae a.k.a. Blaise the Herdsman, an early martyr (fl. 3rd c.)

== Places ==
In Canada:

- Saint-Blaise-sur-Richelieu, Quebec, a municipality in the province of Quebec

In France:

- Saint-Blaise, Alpes-Maritimes, in the department of Alpes-Maritimes
- Saint-Blaise, Haute-Savoie, in the department of Haute-Savoie
- Saint-Blaise-du-Buis, in the department of Isère
- Saint-Blaise-la-Roche (St. Blasien (bei Rappoltsweiler)), in the department of Bas-Rhin
- L'Hôpital-Saint-Blaise, a village and commune in the department of Pyrénées-Atlantiques
- Lentillac-Saint-Blaise, a village and commune in the department of Lot

In Germany:

- Kolleg St. Blasien a Catholic boarding school
- Otto of St. Blasien was a German Benedictine chronicler
- St Blaise, the English name for the town of Sankt Blasien, in Baden-Württemberg
- St. Blaise Abbey in the Black Forest
- St. Blaise church in Balve, in Westphalia

In Switzerland:

- Saint-Blaise, Neuchâtel, a former municipality in the canton of Neuchâtel

In the United Kingdom:

- St. Blaise's Well, a well in Bromley
- St Blaise, an alternate spelling for St Blazey in Cornwall

== Other uses ==
- St. Blaise (horse) winner of the 1883 Epsom Derby

== See also ==
- San Blas (disambiguation)
- San Biagio (disambiguation)
- Blaise (disambiguation)
- Blasius (disambiguation)
- The Bishop Blaize, a pub in Stretford, Greater Manchester
