= Landricourt, Marne =

Landricourt
- Commune
- Location of Landricourt
- Location within France Location within Grand Est
- Coordinates: 48°37′01″N 4°48′41″E
- Country: France
- Region: Grand Est
- Department: Marne
- Arrondissement: Vitry-le-François
- Canton: Sermaize-les-Bains
- Intercommunality: CA Grand Saint-Dizier, Der et Vallées

Government
  - Mayor (2020–2026): Christophe Kihm
- Area^{1}: 5.88 km^{2} (2.27 sq mi)
- Elevation: 66 m (217 ft)
- Population (2023): 130
  - Density: 22/km^{2} (57/sq mi)
- Time zone: UTC+01:00 (CET)
  - Summer (DST): UTC+02:00 (CEST)
- INSEE/Postal code: 51315 /51290
- ^{1} French Land Register data, which excludes lakes, ponds, glaciers > 1 km^{2} (0.386 sq mi or 247 acres) and river estuaries.

Landricourt (French pronunciation: [lɑ̃dʁikuʁ]) is a commune in the Marne department in north-eastern France.

== Geography ==
The river Blaise flows through the commune.

== See also ==
- Communes of the Marne department
