= Giffaumont-Champaubert =

- Commune
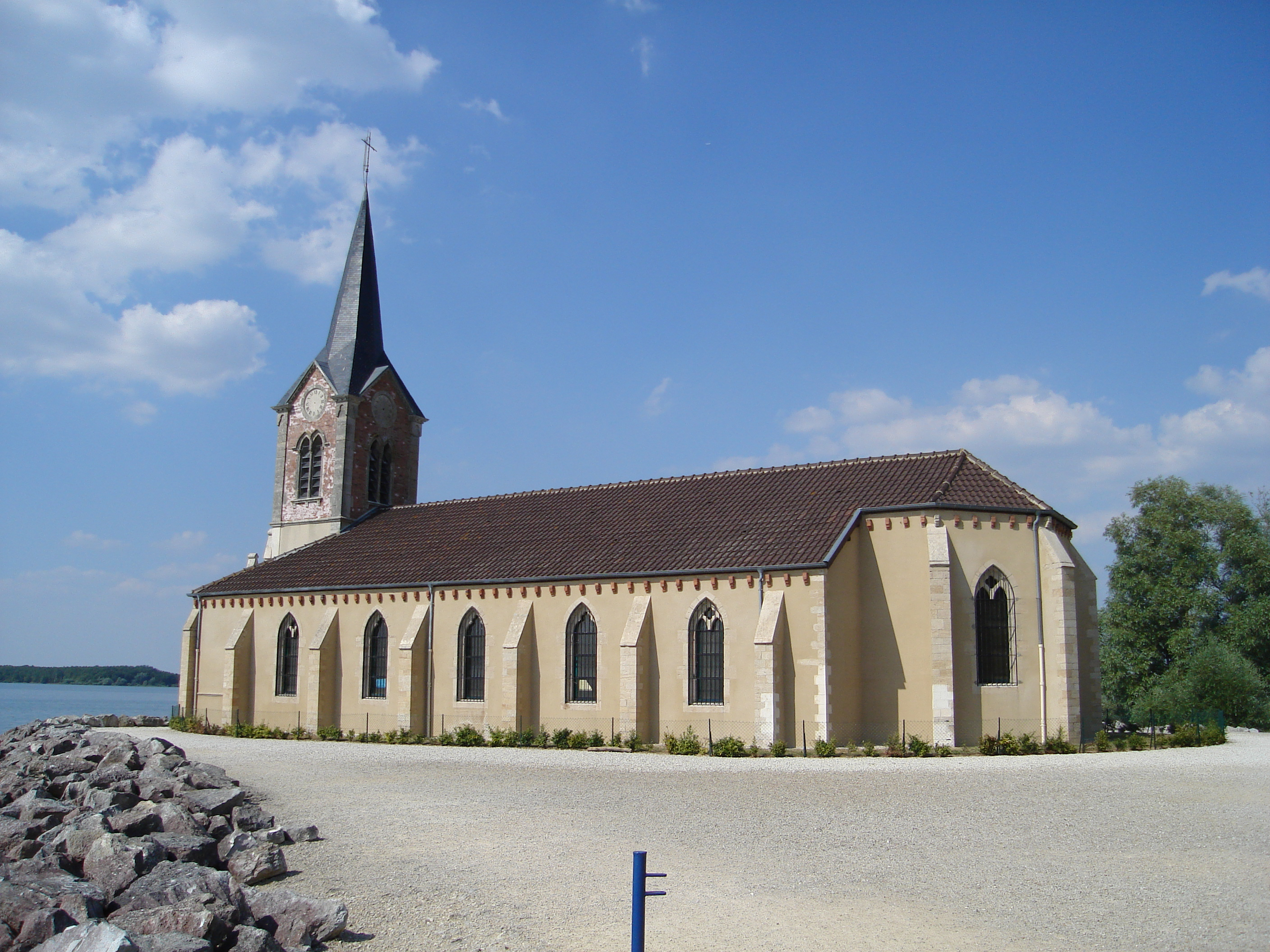
- The church in Champaubert
- Location of Giffaumont-Champaubert
- Location within France Location within Grand Est
- Coordinates: 48°33′20″N 4°45′13″E
- Country: France
- Region: Grand Est
- Department: Marne
- Arrondissement: Vitry-le-François
- Canton: Sermaize-les-Bains

Government
  - Mayor (2020–2026): Jean-Pierre Calabrese
- Area^{1}: 28.16 km^{2} (10.87 sq mi)
- Elevation: 134 m (440 ft)
- Population (2023): 287
  - Density: 10.2/km^{2} (26.4/sq mi)
- Time zone: UTC+01:00 (CET)
  - Summer (DST): UTC+02:00 (CEST)
- INSEE/Postal code: 51269 /51290
- ^{1} French Land Register data, which excludes lakes, ponds, glaciers > 1 km^{2} (0.386 sq mi or 247 acres) and river estuaries.

Giffaumont-Champaubert (French pronunciation: [ʒifomɔ̃ ʃɑ̃pobɛʁ]) is a commune in the Marne department in north-eastern France.

== See also ==
- Communes of the Marne department
