= Montreuil-sur-Blaise =

- Commune
- Location of Montreuil-sur-Blaise
- Location within France Location within Grand Est
- Coordinates: 48°28′39″N 4°57′54″E
- Country: France
- Region: Grand Est
- Department: Haute-Marne
- Arrondissement: Saint-Dizier
- Canton: Wassy
- Intercommunality: CA Grand Saint-Dizier, Der et Vallées

Government
  - Mayor (2020–2026): Laurent Gouverneur
- Area^{1}: 1.36 km^{2} (0.53 sq mi)
- Elevation: 175 m (574 ft)
- Highest elevation: 216 m (709 ft)
- Lowest elevation: 168 m (551 ft)
- Population (2023): 129
  - Density: 94.9/km^{2} (246/sq mi)
- Time zone: UTC+01:00 (CET)
  - Summer (DST): UTC+02:00 (CEST)
- INSEE/Postal code: 52336 /52130
- ^{1} French Land Register data, which excludes lakes, ponds, glaciers > 1 km^{2} (0.386 sq mi or 247 acres) and river estuaries.

Montreuil-sur-Blaise (French pronunciation: [mɔ̃tʁœj syʁ blɛz], literally Montreuil on Blaise) is a commune in the Haute-Marne department in north-eastern France.

== Geography ==
The river Blaise flows through the commune.

== See also ==
- Communes of the Haute-Marne department
