= Vlas =

Vlas is both a surname and a given name. Notable people with the name include:

- Adrian Vlas (born 1982), Romanian footballer
- Valeriu Vlas (born 1971), Moldovan long-distance runner
- Vlas Chubar (1891–1939), Ukrainian Bolshevik and Soviet politician
- Vlas Doroshevich (1864–1922), Russian journalist and writer

== See also ==
- Sveti Vlas, a town in Bulgaria
- Vilina Vlas, a Serbian concentration camp
