= Blaize Punter =

Footballer (born 1996)

Personal information
- Date of birth: 26 December 1996 (age 29)
- Place of birth: Leicester, England
- Height: 1.85 m (6 ft 1 in)
- Position: Defender

Team information
- Current team: Bedworth United

Senior career*
Years	Team	Apps	(Gls)
2014–2015	Mansfield Town	0	(0)
2015	Nuneaton Town	0	(0)
2015–2016	Barwell	3	(0)
2016	Quorn	18	(0)
2016	Kettering Town	0	(0)
2016–2017	Rugby Town	10	(0)
2017–2019	AFC Rushden & Diamonds	41	(0)
2019–	Bedworth United	17	(0)

International career^{‡}
2016	Antigua and Barbuda	1	(0)
- * Club domestic league appearances and goals as of 16:30, 26 January 2020 (UTC) ‡ National team caps and goals as of 16:30, 26 January 2020 (UTC)

Blaize Punter (born 26 December 1996) is a footballer who plays as a defender for Northern Premier League Division One Midlands side Bedworth United. Born in England, he represents the Antigua and Barbuda national team at international level.

== Club career ==
=== Mansfield Town ===
Punter joined Mansfield Town in the summer of 2014 before moving to Nuneaton Town in the summer of 2015 to join the club's Under-21 team.

=== Barwell ===
In 2015, he spent a period on dual registration terms at Barwell before joining the club on a permanent basis. During his time at Barwell, he also spent time on dual-registration at Quorn, a team he then joined briefly in the summer of 2016 for a second period.

=== Kettering Town ===
In August 2016 he joined Kettering Town

=== Rugby Town ===
Punter then joined Rugby Town in October 2016.

=== AFC Rushden & Diamonds ===
In August 2017 he signed for AFC Rushden & Diamonds, having earned a deal after appearing for the club in pre-season friendly matches.

=== Bedworth United ===
On 12 September 2019, Punter signed for Southern League Division One Central side Bedworth United.

== International career ==
Punter was called up by Antigua and Barbuda for the first time in 2016 and made his full international debut as a substitute on 8 October 2016 in a 2017 Caribbean Cup qualification third round group 3 match against Puerto Rico.
