= Éclaron-Braucourt-Sainte-Livière =

- Commune
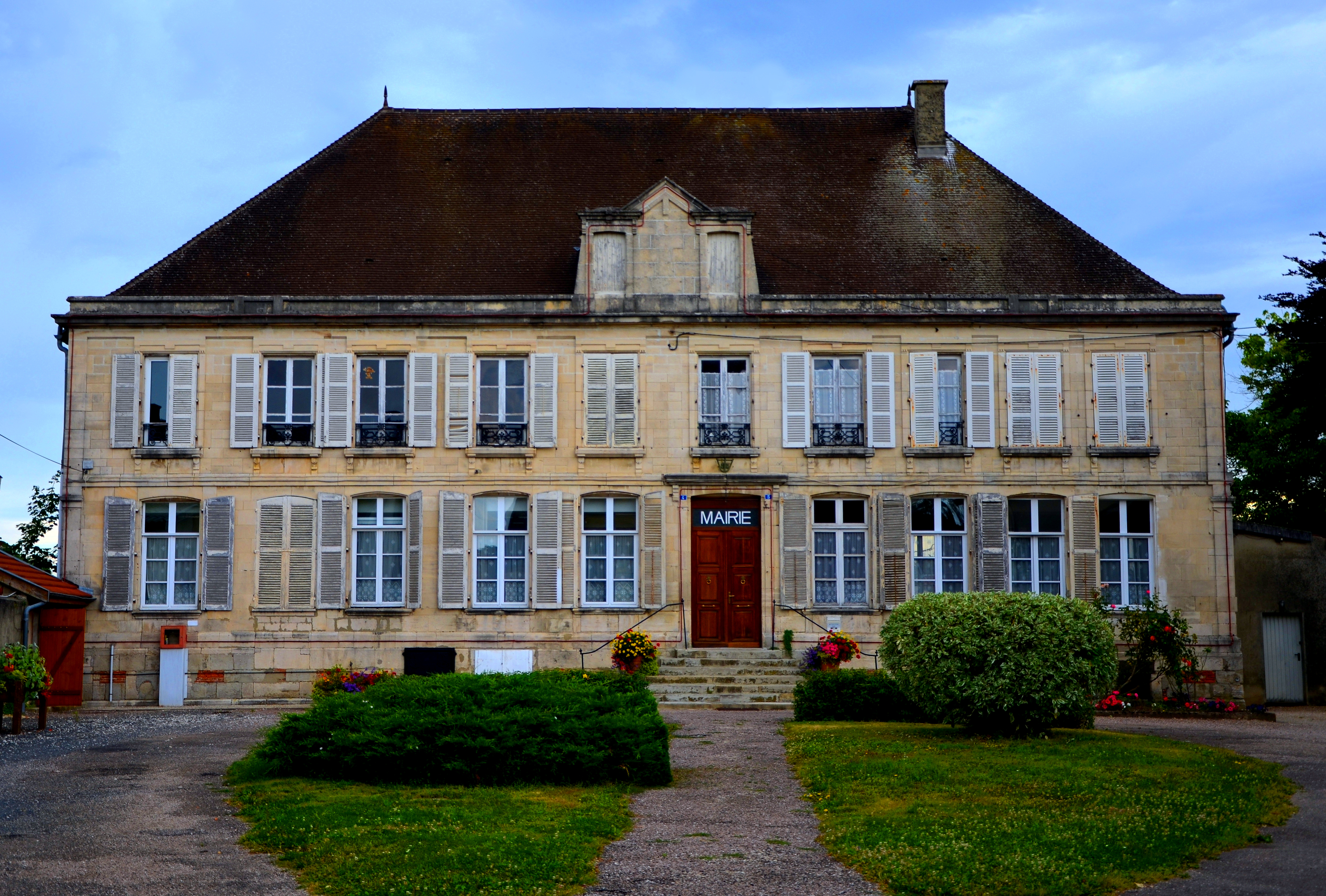
- The town hall in Éclaron

- Coat of arms
- Location of Éclaron-Braucourt-Sainte-Livière
- Location within France Location within Grand Est
- Coordinates: 48°35′30″N 4°52′01″E
- Country: France
- Region: Grand Est
- Department: Haute-Marne
- Arrondissement: Saint-Dizier
- Canton: Saint-Dizier-1
- Intercommunality: CA Grand Saint-Dizier, Der et Vallées

Government
  - Mayor (2020–2026): Jean-Yves Marin
- Area^{1}: 57.7 km^{2} (22.3 sq mi)
- Elevation: 135 m (443 ft)
- Population (2023): 2,008
  - Density: 34.8/km^{2} (90.1/sq mi)
- Time zone: UTC+01:00 (CET)
  - Summer (DST): UTC+02:00 (CEST)
- INSEE/Postal code: 52182 /52290
- ^{1} French Land Register data, which excludes lakes, ponds, glaciers > 1 km^{2} (0.386 sq mi or 247 acres) and river estuaries.

Éclaron-Braucourt-Sainte-Livière (French pronunciation: [eklaʁɔ̃ bʁokuʁ sɛ̃t livjɛʁ]) is a commune in the Haute-Marne department in north-eastern France. It was created in 1973 by the merger of two former communes: Braucourt and Éclaron, joined by Sainte-Livière in 1975.

== Geography ==
The river Blaise flows through the commune.

== Population ==
Population data refer to the commune in its geography as of January 2025.

Historical population
Year	Pop.	±% p.a.
1968	1,831	—
1975	2,006	+1.31%
1982	1,940	−0.48%
1990	1,827	−0.75%
1999	1,844	+0.10%
2007	1,969	+0.82%
2012	2,066	+0.97%
2017	2,019	−0.46%
2023	2,008	−0.09%
Source: INSEE

== See also ==
- Communes of the Haute-Marne department
