= Guindrecourt-sur-Blaise =

- Commune
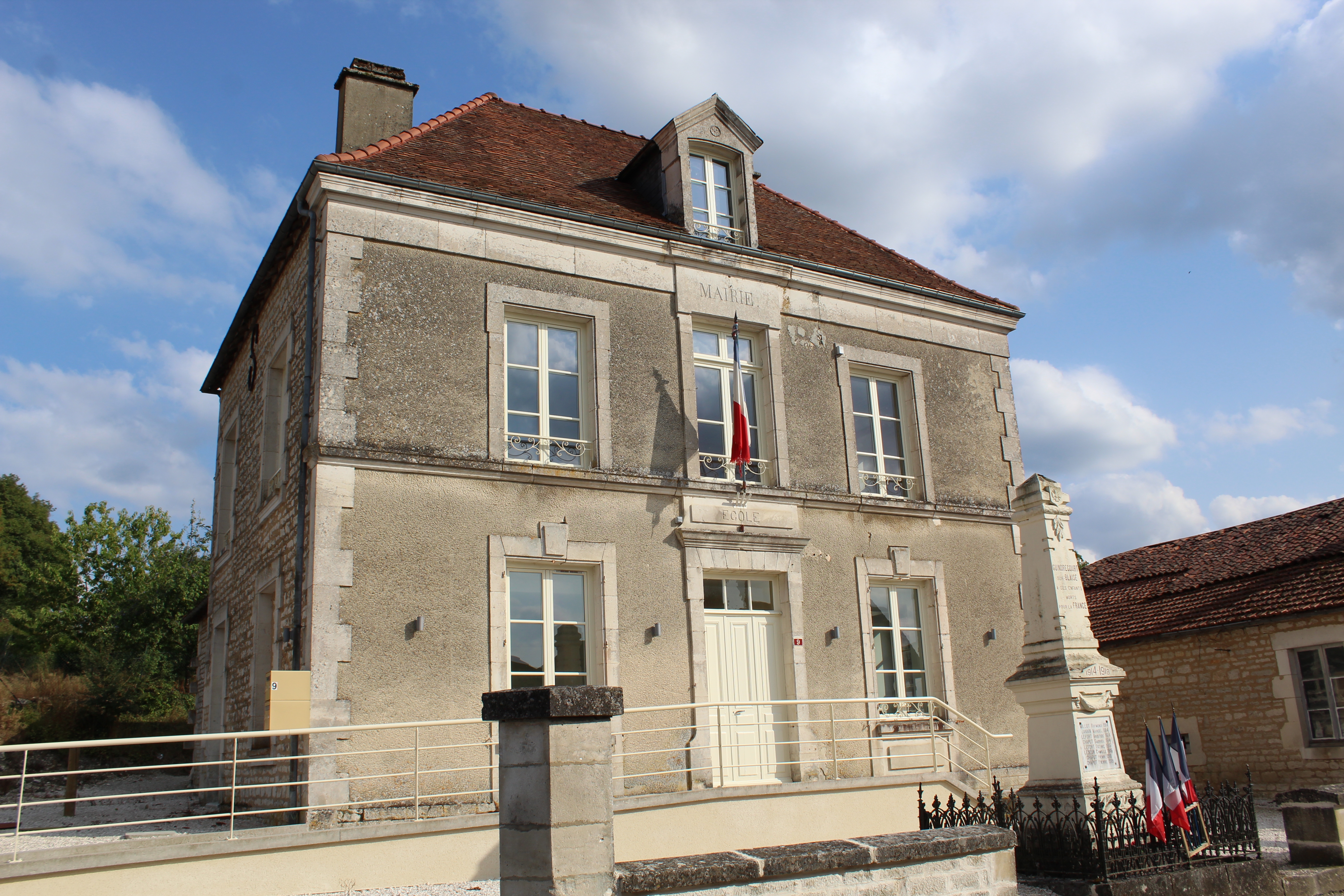
- The town hall in Guindrecourt-sur-Blaise
- Location of Guindrecourt-sur-Blaise
- Location within France Location within Grand Est
- Coordinates: 48°17′50″N 4°58′29″E
- Country: France
- Region: Grand Est
- Department: Haute-Marne
- Arrondissement: Chaumont
- Canton: Bologne
- Intercommunality: CA Chaumont

Government
  - Mayor (2021–2026): Didier Prudent
- Area^{1}: 5.52 km^{2} (2.13 sq mi)
- Elevation: 264 m (866 ft)
- Population (2023): 51
  - Density: 9.2/km^{2} (24/sq mi)
- Demonym(s): Guindrecourtois, Guindrecourtoises
- Time zone: UTC+01:00 (CET)
  - Summer (DST): UTC+02:00 (CEST)
- INSEE/Postal code: 52232 /52330
- ^{1} French Land Register data, which excludes lakes, ponds, glaciers > 1 km^{2} (0.386 sq mi or 247 acres) and river estuaries.

Guindrecourt-sur-Blaise (French pronunciation: [ɡɛ̃dʁəkuʁ syʁ blɛz], literally Guindrecourt on Blaise) is a commune in the Haute-Marne department in north-eastern France.

== Geography ==
The river Blaise flows through the commune.

== See also ==
- Communes of the Haute-Marne department
