= Blaze (given name) =

Blaze is a primarily masculine given name of English origin. It may refer to:

- Blaze Alexander (born 1999), American professional baseball player
- Blaze Bayley (born 1963), English heavy metal singer
- Blaze Berdahl (born 1980), American actress, singer, rapper, voice-over actor, announcer and narrator
- Blaze Berlowitz (born 2005), American football player
- Blaze Bernstein (1998–2018), American murder victim
- Blaze Jordan (born 2002), American baseball player
- Blaze Riorden (born 1994), American lacrosse goalie

== See also ==
- Blaže Ristovski (1931–2018), Macedonian linguist, folklorist and historian
- Blaze the Cat, A character (cat) from the video game series Sonic the Hedgehog.
