= Serge Moléon Blaise =

Haitian painter

Serge Moléon Blaise (born 1951) is a Haitian painter. Born in Cap-Haïtien, Blaise paints scenes from Haitian history, especially battle scenes. His younger brothers, Fabolon and Saint-Louis, are also noted painters of the region.
