= Cirey-sur-Blaise =

- Commune
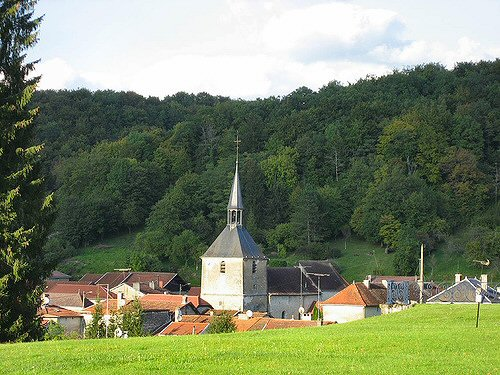
- Village of Cirey-sur-Blaise

- Coat of arms
- Location of Cirey-sur-Blaise
- Location within France Location within Grand Est
- Coordinates: 48°19′59″N 4°56′29″E
- Country: France
- Region: Grand Est
- Department: Haute-Marne
- Arrondissement: Saint-Dizier
- Canton: Joinville

Government
  - Mayor (2020–2026): Jean Guillaumée
- Area^{1}: 16.44 km^{2} (6.35 sq mi)
- Elevation: 233 m (764 ft)
- Highest elevation: 328 m (1,076 ft)
- Lowest elevation: 216 m (709 ft)
- Population (2023): 108
  - Density: 6.57/km^{2} (17.0/sq mi)
- Time zone: UTC+01:00 (CET)
  - Summer (DST): UTC+02:00 (CEST)
- INSEE/Postal code: 52129 /52110
- ^{1} French Land Register data, which excludes lakes, ponds, glaciers > 1 km^{2} (0.386 sq mi or 247 acres) and river estuaries.

Cirey-sur-Blaise (French pronunciation: [siʁɛ syʁ blɛz], literally Cirey on Blaise) is a commune in the Haute-Marne department in north-eastern France.

== Geography ==
The river Blaise flows through the commune.

== See also ==
- Chateau de Cirey
- Communes of the Haute-Marne department
