= Blaze (toy) =

Rocking horse toy

- Type: Rocking horse
- Company: Mattel
- Country: United States
- Availability: 1961–?

Blaze was a rocking horse toy produced by Mattel toymakers and introduced in 1961. Blaze was featured prominently during children's television advertising (Mattel was the first toymaker to advertise year around with television commercials). Unlike other rocking-horses of the time, Blaze was mounted on a stand that was said to be "untippable" and had no springs. The apparatus prevented pinched fingers, and was fitted out with a mechanism that moved the horses legs in "real life action." Another Mattel feature allowed Blaze to talk when you pulled his "Magic Ring." His talking voice unit was the very same one produced by Mattel and unveiled in 1960 in its talking Chatty Cathy doll, and later toys like the Talking Mister Ed puppet. Blaze could say 11 different things like, "How about some hay?"; he could also whinny and neigh. A toy like this, that could gallop and move realistically when the horse was rocked forward and backward, was something special.

Blaze was made of what Mattel called "hi-impact plastic" with black-and-white markings (a pinto pony), and a molded black saddle and red blanket. Blaze also had attached reins, fixed hand-posts, and 2-position foot rests. The stand was made of 1-inch tubular steel and was advertised as being "untippable." Saddle height was 29 inches and was recommended for ages 1–7. Blaze was marketed in most retail catalogs, such as Sears, JCPenney, and Montgomery Ward. When first issued, Blaze did not have the talking feature, this was added very quickly after his initial release, so there may be versions of this toy that do not, and never did, talk.
