= Blaise reaction =

Type of chemical reaction

Named after	Edmond E. Blaise
Reaction type	Coupling reaction

Identifiers
Organic Chemistry Portal	blaise-reaction
RSC ontology ID	RXNO:0000237

The Blaise reaction is an organic reaction that forms a β-ketoester from the reaction of zinc metal with an α-bromoester and a nitrile. The reaction was first reported by Edmond Blaise (1872–1939) in 1901. The final intermediate is a metaloimine, which is then hydrolyzed to give the desired β-ketoester.

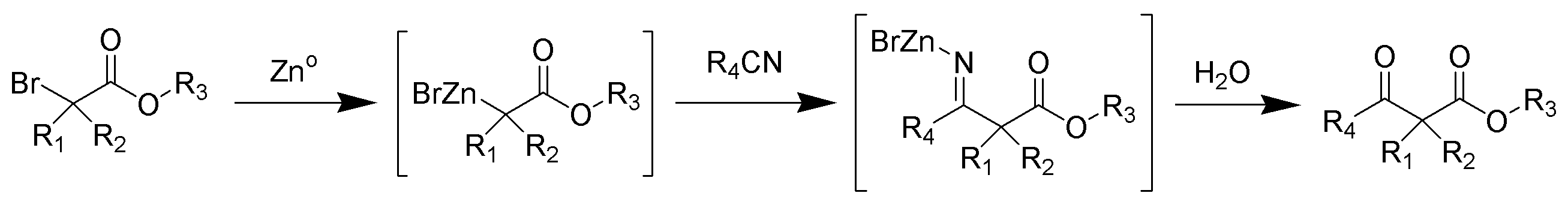
The Blaise reaction

Bulky aliphatic esters tend to give higher yields. Steven Hannick and Yoshito Kishi have developed an improved procedure.

It has been noted that free hydroxyl groups can be tolerated in the course of this reaction, which is surprising for reactions of organometallic halides.

== Mechanism ==
The mechanism of the Blaise reaction involves the formation of an organozinc complex with the bromine alpha to the ester carbonyl. This makes the alpha carbon nucleophilic, allowing it to attack the electrophilic carbon of the nitrile. The negative nitrile nitrogen resulting from this attack complexes with the zinc monobromide cation. The β-enamino ester (tautomer of the imine intermediate pictured above) product is revealed by work-up with 50% K_{2}CO_{3} aq. If the β-ketoester is the desired product, addition of 1 M hydrochloric acid hydrolyzes the β-enamino ester to turn the enamino into a ketone, forming the β-ketoester.

Blaise Rxn Mechanism

== See also ==
- Blaise ketone synthesis
- Reformatsky reaction
