= Blaise ketone synthesis =

Specific chemical reaction

Named after	Edmond Blaise
Reaction type	Coupling reaction

The Blaise ketone synthesis (named after Edmond Blaise) is the chemical reaction of acid chlorides with organozinc compounds to give ketones.

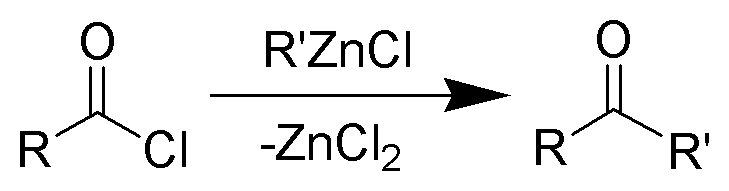
The Blaise ketone synthesis

The reaction was claimed to bring excellent yields by Blaise, however, investigators failed to obtain better than moderate yields (50%). Thus, the reaction is particularly ineffective in forming ketones from acyl chlorides. The reaction also works with organocuprates. Reviews have been written.

== Reaction mechanism ==
The mechanism is sampled from the proposed mechanism for organocadmium compounds, given that the mechanisms are identical to one another the proposed mechanism for the reaction is the same as the one for organocadmium compounds.

Proposed mechanism for the Blaise ketone synthesis.

After the oxygen forms a bond with the organozinc compound, R’ shifts to the carbonyl carbon, having chlorine act as a leaving group and removing the negative charge from zinc. The chlorine that left returns to form a bond with zinc, pushing the electrons back on to oxygen and thus forming the ketone.

== Variations ==
=== Blaise-Maire reaction ===
The Blaise-Maire reaction is the Blaise ketone synthesis using β-hydroxy acid chlorides to give β-hydroxyketones, which are converted into α,β-unsaturated ketones using sulfuric acid.

=== Ketone formation from organocadmium compounds ===
This ketone formation is an identical reaction to the Blaise ketone synthesis. Only instead of organozinc compounds, organocadmium compounds are used and produce higher yields.

== See also ==
- Blaise reaction
- Negishi coupling
