= Blaise (Marne) =

River in France

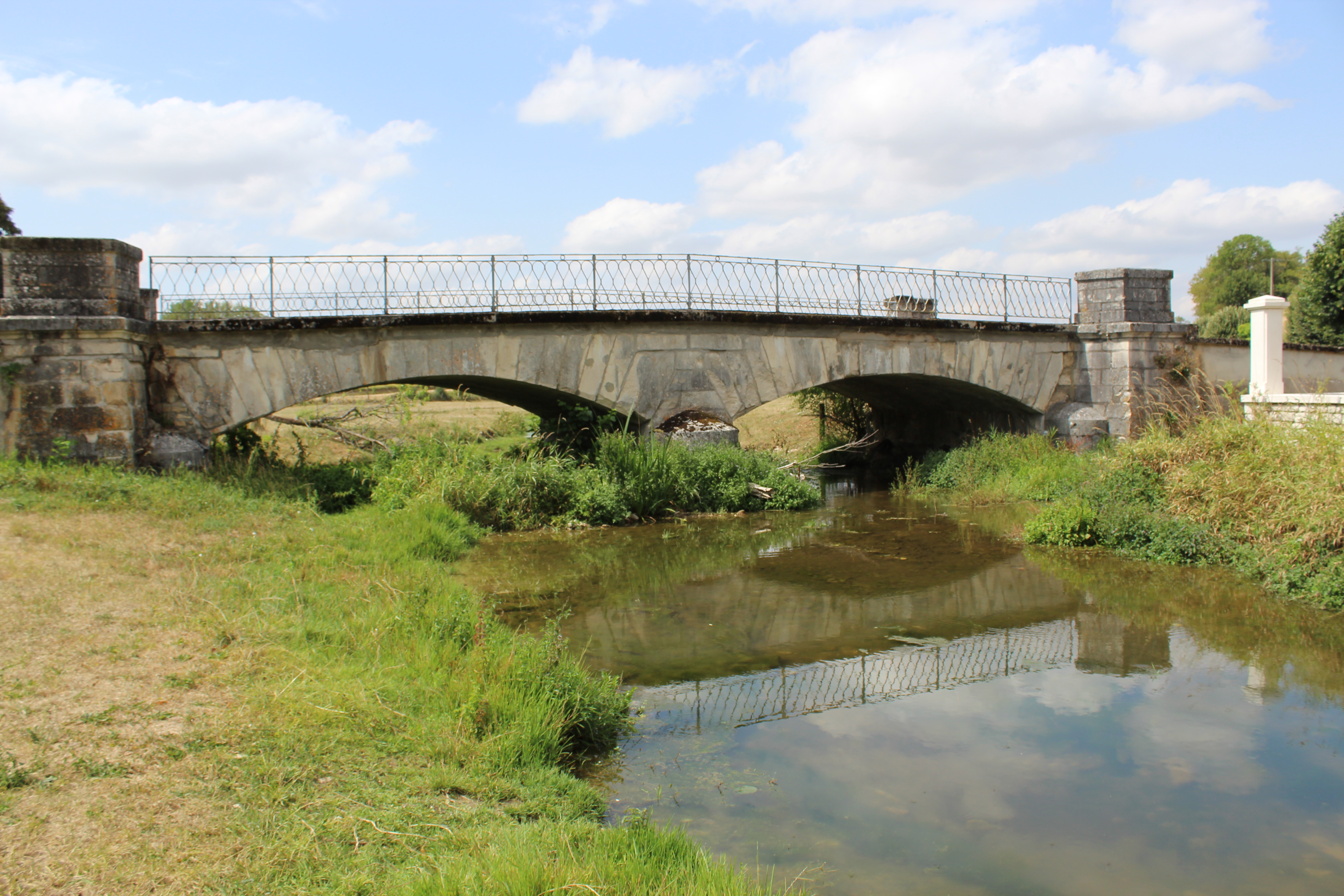

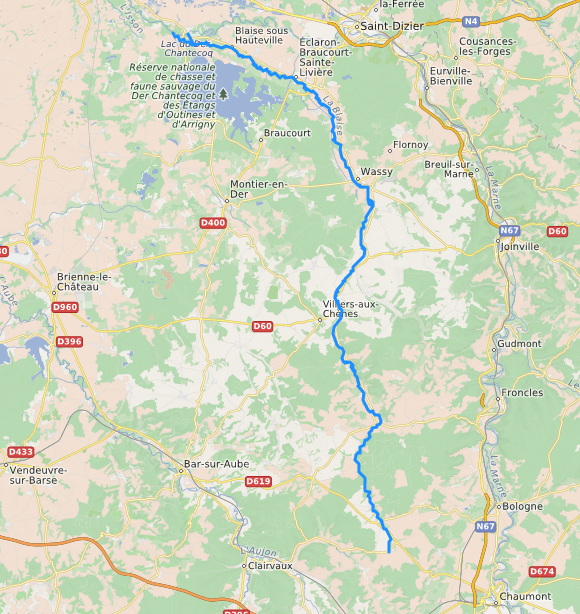

Location
- Country: France

Physical characteristics
- Source
  - location: Gillancourt
  - coordinates: 48°09′31″N 04°59′32″E
  - elevation: 305 m (1,001 ft)
- Mouth
  - location: Marne
  - coordinates: 48°37′41″N 04°41′52″E
  - elevation: 110 m (360 ft)
- Length: 85.6 km (53.2 mi)
- Basin size: 480 km^{2} (190 sq mi)

Basin features
- Progression: Marne→ Seine→ English Channel

The Blaise (French pronunciation: [blɛz]) is an 85.6 km (53.2 mi) long river in the Haute-Marne and Marne departments in northeastern France. Its source is in the village of Gillancourt. It flows generally northwest. It is a left tributary of the Marne into which it flows at Arrigny.

== Departments and communes along its course ==
This list is ordered from source to mouth:

- Haute-Marne: Gillancourt, Blaisy, Juzennecourt, Lachapelle-en-Blaisy, Lamothe-en-Blaisy, Colombey-les-Deux-Églises, Curmont, Guindrecourt-sur-Blaise, Daillancourt, Bouzancourt, Cirey-sur-Blaise, Arnancourt, Doulevant-le-Château, Dommartin-le-Saint-Père, Courcelles-sur-Blaise, Dommartin-le-Franc, Ville-en-Blaisois, Doulevant-le-Petit, Rachecourt-Suzémont, Vaux-sur-Blaise, Montreuil-sur-Blaise, Brousseval, Wassy, Attancourt, Louvemont, Allichamps, Humbécourt, Éclaron-Braucourt-Sainte-Livière
- Marne: Landricourt, Sainte-Marie-du-Lac-Nuisement, Hauteville, Écollemont, Arrigny
