= Sainte-Marie-du-Lac-Nuisement =

- Commune
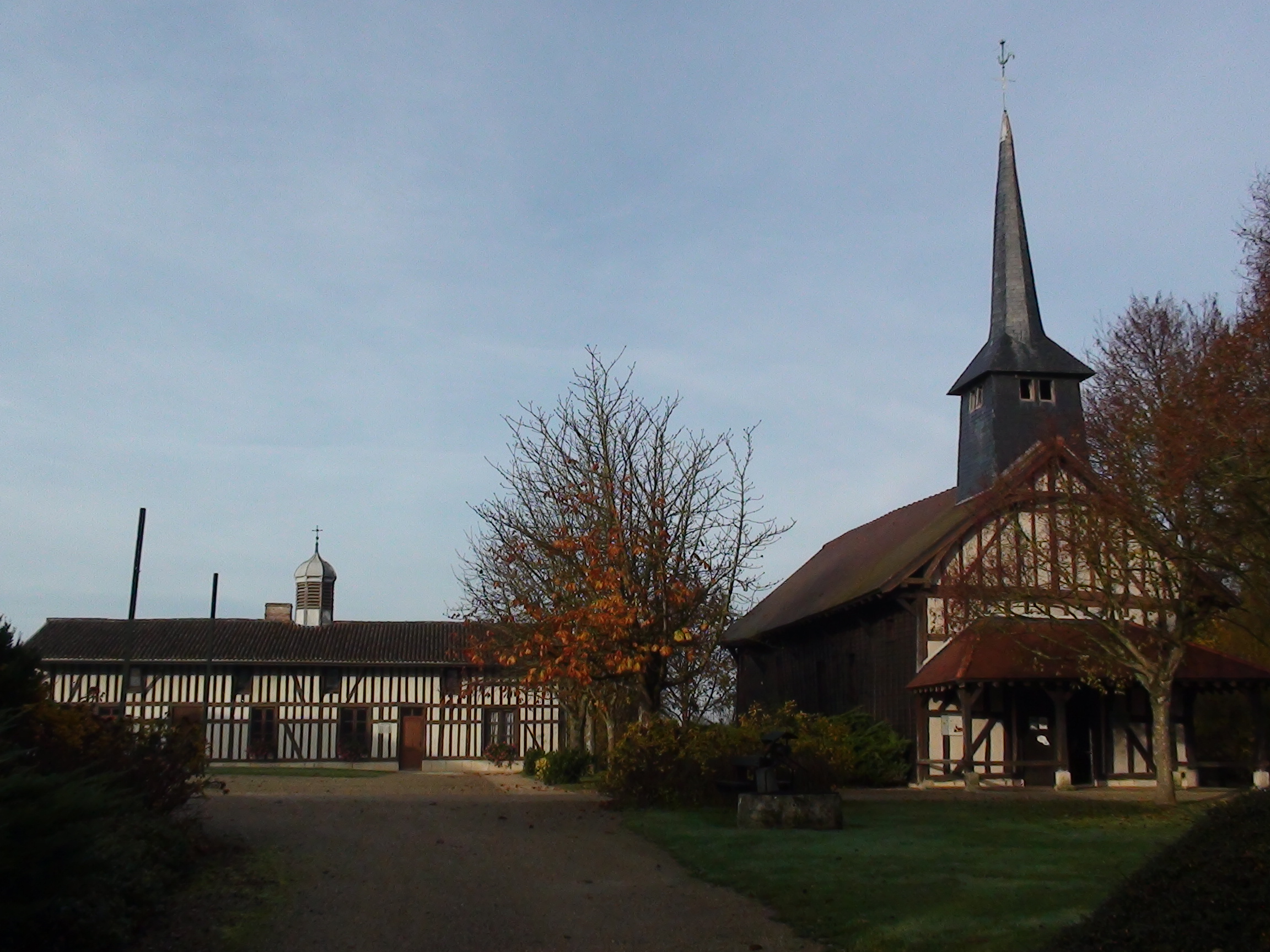
- The church in Sainte-Marie-du-Lac-Nuisement

- Coat of arms
- Location of Sainte-Marie-du-Lac-Nuisement
- Location within France Location within Grand Est
- Coordinates: 48°36′23″N 4°46′38″E
- Country: France
- Region: Grand Est
- Department: Marne
- Arrondissement: Vitry-le-François
- Canton: Sermaize-les-Bains

Government
  - Mayor (2020–2026): Alain Bouché
- Area^{1}: 17.35 km^{2} (6.70 sq mi)
- Elevation: 136 m (446 ft)
- Population (2023): 277
  - Density: 16.0/km^{2} (41.4/sq mi)
- Time zone: UTC+01:00 (CET)
  - Summer (DST): UTC+02:00 (CEST)
- INSEE/Postal code: 51277 /51290
- ^{1} French Land Register data, which excludes lakes, ponds, glaciers > 1 km^{2} (0.386 sq mi or 247 acres) and river estuaries.

Sainte-Marie-du-Lac-Nuisement (French pronunciation: [sɛ̃t maʁi dy lak nɥizmɑ̃]) is a commune in the Marne department in north-eastern France.

== Geography ==
The river Blaise flows through the commune.

== See also ==
- Communes of the Marne department
