= Blaise Diesbourg =

Canadian smuggler and bootlegger

- Born: Blaise Diesbourg; February 3, 1897; Rochester Township, Ontario, Canada
- Died: 1989
- Occupations: Gangster, bootlegger, criminal, racketeer

Blaise Diesbourg, born in 1897, was also known as "King Canada," and was a major figure in the liquor smuggling and bootlegging business around Windsor, Ontario during the American prohibition period. His success brought him in contact with Al Capone, who arranged a deal with Diesbourg to supply him with regular shipments of alcohol by plane. Diesbourg took the name "King Canada" at this time as an alias to hide from legal authorities.

== Early life ==
Diesbourg was born in Rochester Township, a farming area near Belle River, the son of Paul and Mary Jane Diesbourg, he was the 10th of 12 children. Belle River was a small town east of Windsor, Ontario. The French-Canadian Diesbourg started his career as a small-time bootlegger, serving bar at his brother Charlie's hotel, the Wellington, on the main street of Belle River. His early bootlegging operations were only local, he never sent the liquor across the border into the United States. Diesbourg saw significant profits, since he would buy whiskey for about $1.25 a case and sell it for $3.00. At some point during 1925–26, he opened his own hotel, called the Omar Hotel, and expanded into the export business.

== Export business ==
Due to the ease and proximity of smuggling across the Detroit River to the United States, it was an obvious choice for Diesbourg to expand his operations across the border. Farming or fishing wages of $35 a month could not compete with monthly rum running salaries of $400 a month for a captain. Seventy-five percent of all illegal liquor brought into the United States was transported across the Detroit River from Canada, mainly along the thirty-five mile stretch from Lake Erie to the St. Clair River. In fact, the city's two major industries during this time were the manufacturing of automobiles and the distribution of Canadian liquor. Enforcement was difficult, if not impossible, by authorities from both Canada and the United States. It is estimated that in the vicinity of Detroit, over a thousand cases of liquor a day were legally shipped from Canada upon vessels bound to international locations.

Diesbourg was very successful in smuggling the alcohol to the U.S., working with the Mexico Export Company, the largest outfit at the time. He would take the whiskey across the ice in the winter months. "It was like a highway out there," Diesbourg recalled, "the cars going back and forth, and no one to stop you." He said that it was very hard to catch smugglers in the winter. The export docks were all along the river, and people paid cash for the liquor, up to $10,000 at times. Diesbourg spent his money almost as fast as he made it.

In addition to boats and cars, King Canada smuggled liquor by plane. Being one of the few to utilize that strategy, he stockpiled his loads of whiskey and beer, which he called "plants", underground to hide them from the authorities, placing the liquor in cisterns right under the feet of authorities that would search the place, which were never found. He would load the planes on fields he rented from farmers in exchange for a case of beer or whiskey.

== Contact with Al Capone ==
Smuggling via planes gave Diesbourg his greatest wealth; it was also in this time that he came in contact with Al Capone. The mafia boss came to see him at the Mexico Export Dock, and they discussed business in Diesbourg's brother Charlie's cellar. From the start, Diesbourg demonstrated he was not afraid of Capone, and the kingpin could not push him around. Diesbourg recalled their meeting, telling the gangster, "Listen, I am King Canada, and you know you can't fool around with me. I know every move in Chicago—every move you make." When asked how he knew this, he replied, "What do you think I am? Don't you think I know something through the government of what's going on in Chicago?" Diesbourg recalled how, despite Capone's tough attitude, he was "a good guy," never talking tough to King Canada. They would meet only once more after the meeting in the cellar, in Chicago, when Diesbourg flew down with his pilots. Working with Capone, Diesbourg used old bombers that could hold twenty-five cases of whiskey. They would meet at six in the morning and load up the planes, regardless of the weather.

== Legacy ==
Since his death in 1989, Blaise Diesbourg has added new interest in tourism in his hometown of Belle River. A local councilor, Ray Lalonde, has attempted to showcase the town's rum-running history by using Diesbourg and Al Capone's names. Old prohibition buildings, including their secret passages to transport liquor, could be turned into museums for anyone interested in the history of prohibition.

== See also ==
- Rum-running in Windsor
