= Blaze (surname) =

Blaze is the surname of the following:

- Bobby Blaze (born 1963), former American professional wrestler
- Louis Edmund Blaze (1861–1951), Sri Lankan Burgher educationist and founder of Kingswood College, Kandy, Sri Lanka
- Matt Blaze, American computer scientist
- Richard Blaze (born 1985), English rugby union coach and former player
- Robin Blaze (born 1971), English opera singer
- Shaynna Blaze (born 1963), Australian interior designer, television personality, writer and former singer
