= Arrigny =

- Commune
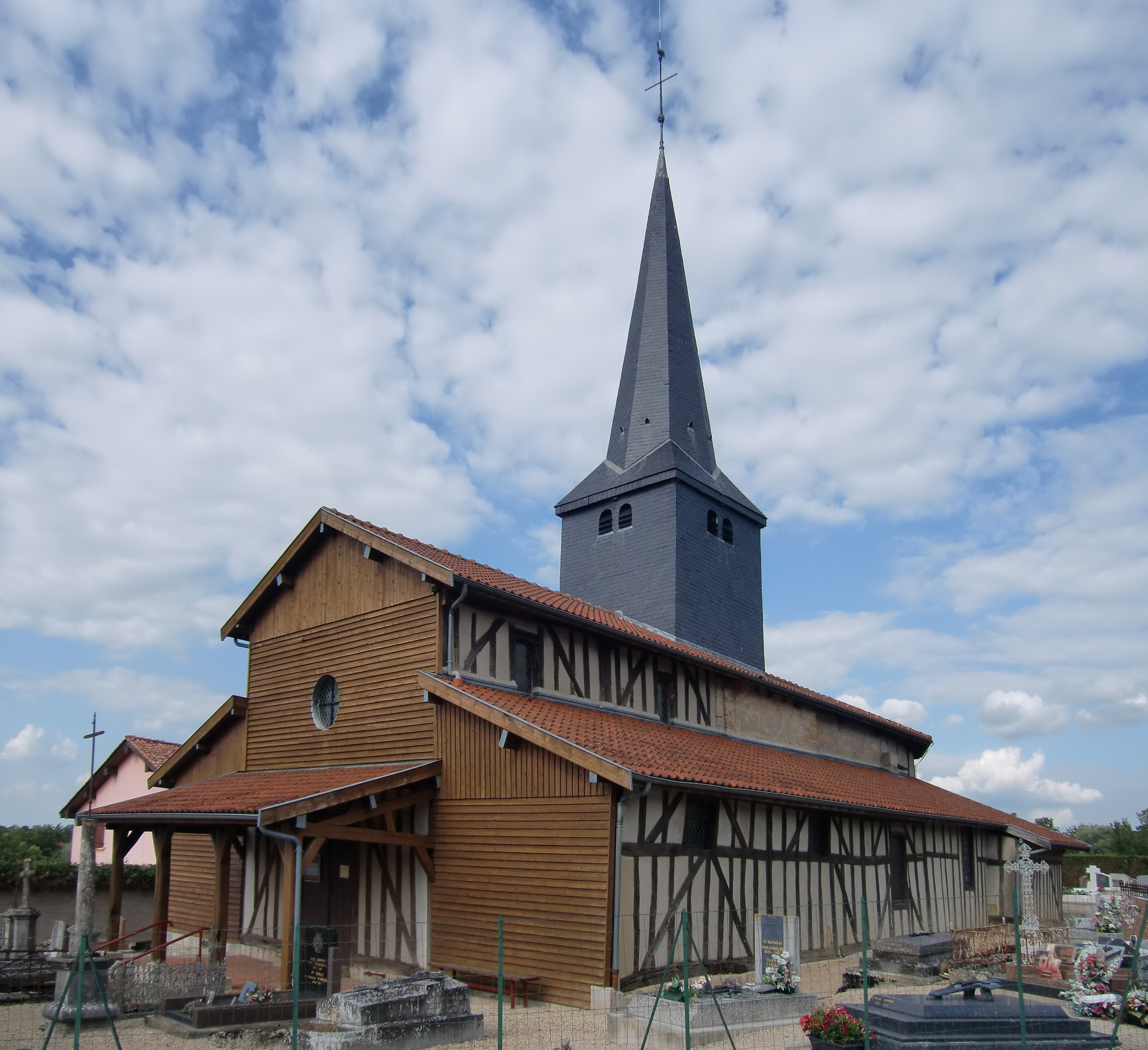
- The church in Arrigny

- Coat of arms
- Location of Arrigny
- Location within France Location within Grand Est
- Coordinates: 48°37′28″N 4°42′27″E
- Country: France
- Region: Grand Est
- Department: Marne
- Arrondissement: Vitry-le-François
- Canton: Sermaize-les-Bains
- Intercommunality: CC Perthois-Bocage Der

Government
  - Mayor (2020–2026): Laurent Bouquet
- Area^{1}: 16.08 km^{2} (6.21 sq mi)
- Elevation: 114 m (374 ft)
- Population (2023): 227
  - Density: 14.1/km^{2} (36.6/sq mi)
- Time zone: UTC+01:00 (CET)
  - Summer (DST): UTC+02:00 (CEST)
- INSEE/Postal code: 51016 /51290
- ^{1} French Land Register data, which excludes lakes, ponds, glaciers > 1 km^{2} (0.386 sq mi or 247 acres) and river estuaries.

Arrigny (French pronunciation: [aʁiɲi]) is a commune in the Marne department in north-eastern France.

== Geography ==
The river Blaise flows into the Marne in the commune.

== Population ==
Historical population
| Year | Pop. | ±% p.a. |
|---|---|---|
| 1968 | 251 | — |
| 1975 | 213 | −2.32% |
| 1982 | 236 | +1.48% |
| 1990 | 284 | +2.34% |
| 1999 | 256 | −1.15% |
| 2007 | 267 | +0.53% |
| 2012 | 262 | −0.38% |
| 2017 | 244 | −1.41% |
| 2023 | 227 | −1.20% |
Source: INSEE

== See also ==
- Communes of the Marne department
