= Heinrich Wilhelm Blasius =

German-born American meteorologist

- Born: 24 July 1818; Eckenbach, Germany
- Died: 24 March 1899; Brunswick, Germany
- Other names: William Blasius
- Notable work: Storms: Their Nature Classification and Laws
- Scientific career
- Fields: natural history meteorology

Heinrich Wilhelm Blasius (1818–1899), later known as William Blasius was a German-born American meteorologist. He was elected as a member of the American Philosophical Society in 1875.

== Biography ==
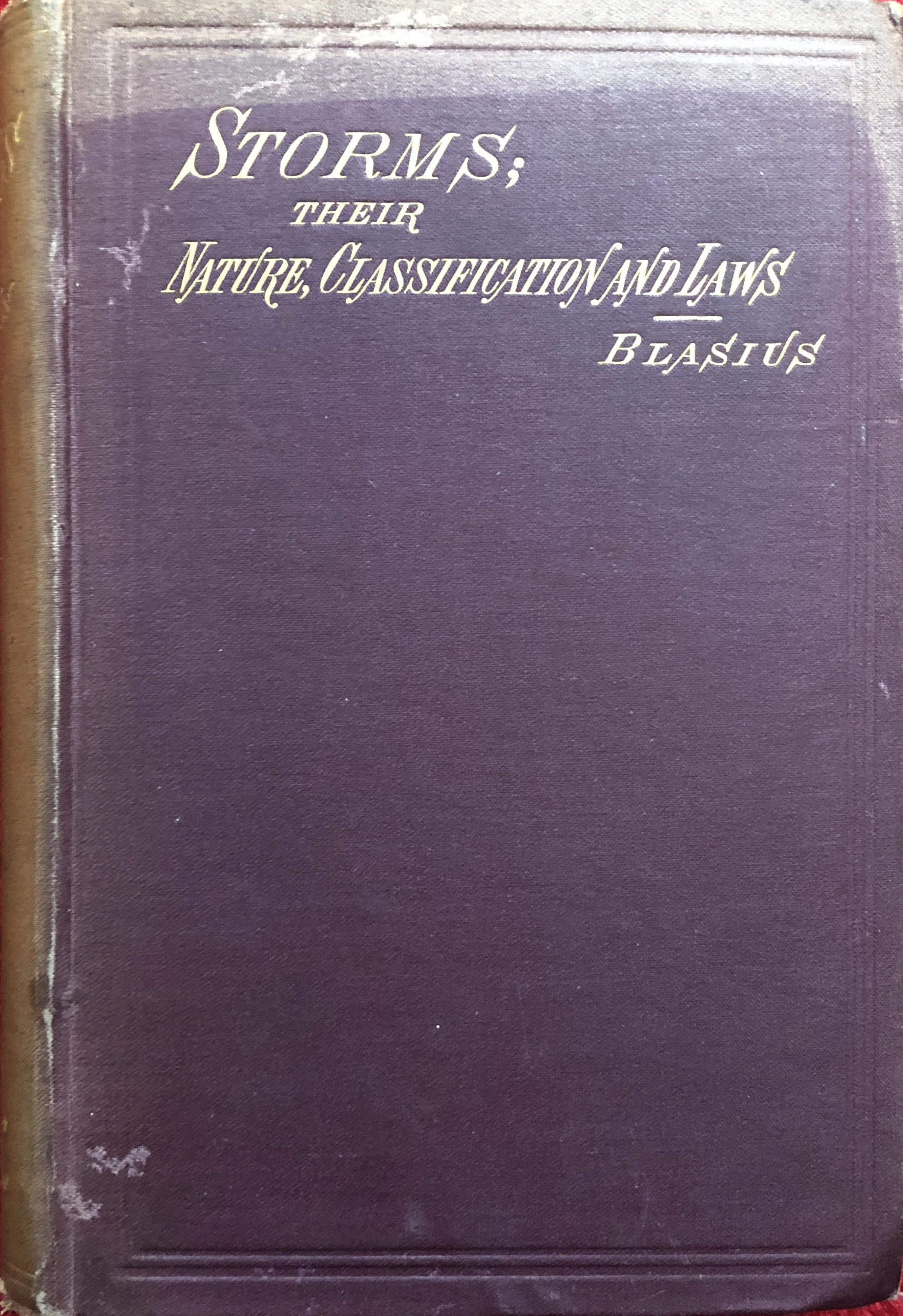
Storms: Their Nature Classification and Laws by William Blasius, published in 1875.

Blasius was born in Eckenbach near Nümbrecht and his older brother was zoologist Johann Heinrich Blasius.

He studied natural sciences, especially zoology, in Bonn from 1842 to 1847. After his studies he became a professor of natural history at the Lyceum in Hanover. In 1850 he emigrated to the United States for political reasons and lived in Cambridge near Boston. In 1852, Blasius put forward a theory about the genesis of storms similar in many points to the basic views of later adopted Norwegian frontal theory, following in the steps of Heinrich Wilhelm Dove. However, he found few supporters because he created his own terminology and did not substantiate his theories. His theses were soon largely forgotten.

Blasius received US citizenship in 1860 and was elected to the American Philosophical Society in 1875.

In 1888 Blasius returned to Germany, where he gave a few more meteorological lectures. Blaise died in Brunswick in 1899.
