= Courcelles-sur-Blaise =

- Commune
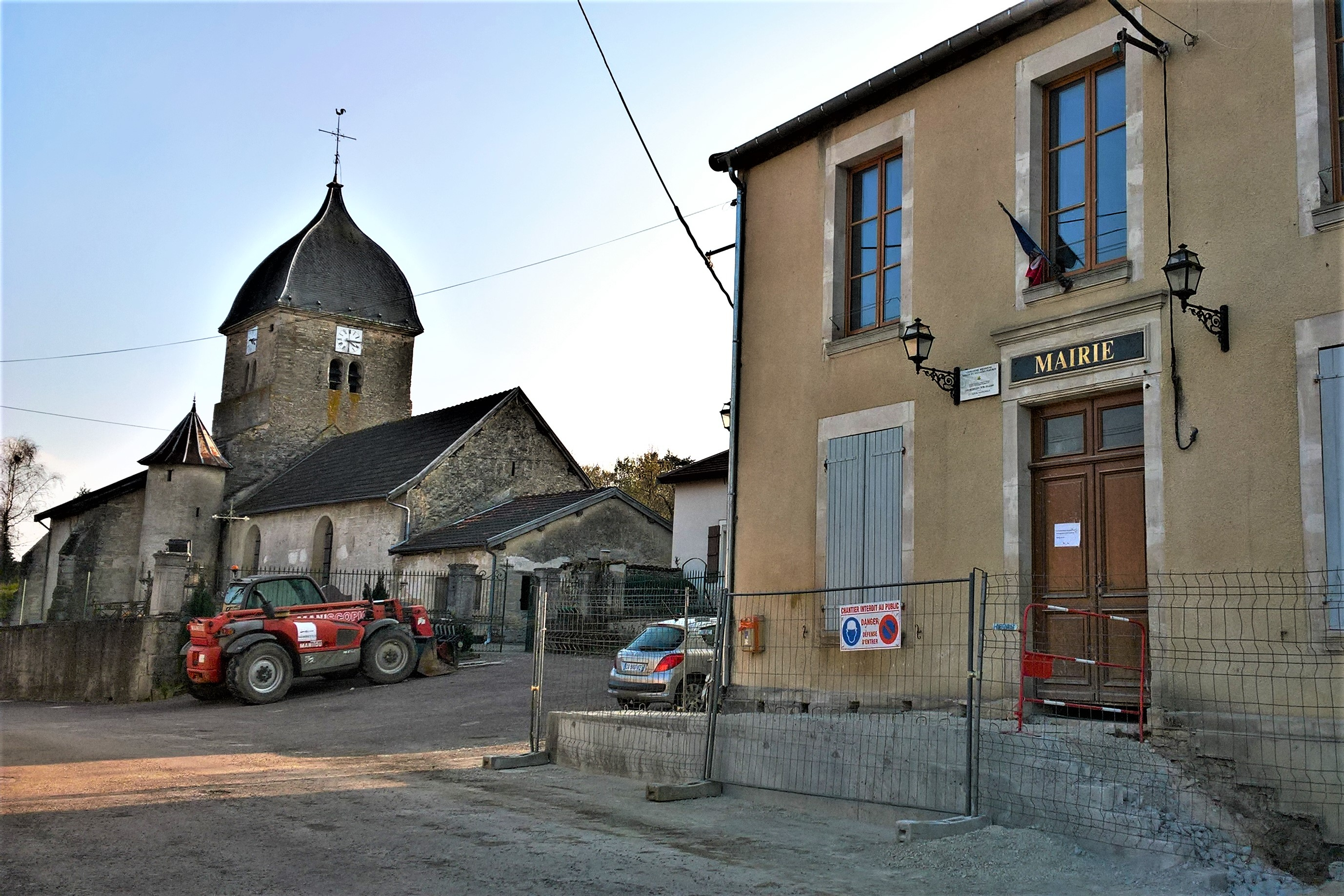
- The church and town hall in Courcelles-sur-Blaise
- Location of Courcelles-sur-Blaise
- Location within France Location within Grand Est
- Coordinates: 48°24′57″N 4°56′31″E
- Country: France
- Region: Grand Est
- Department: Haute-Marne
- Arrondissement: Saint-Dizier
- Canton: Joinville
- Intercommunality: CC Bassin de Joinville en Champagne

Government
  - Mayor (2020–2026): Benjamin Fevre
- Area^{1}: 5.67 km^{2} (2.19 sq mi)
- Elevation: 194 m (636 ft)
- Highest elevation: 250 m (820 ft)
- Lowest elevation: 189 m (620 ft)
- Population (2023): 86
  - Density: 15/km^{2} (39/sq mi)
- Time zone: UTC+01:00 (CET)
  - Summer (DST): UTC+02:00 (CEST)
- INSEE/Postal code: 52149 /52110
- ^{1} French Land Register data, which excludes lakes, ponds, glaciers > 1 km^{2} (0.386 sq mi or 247 acres) and river estuaries.

Courcelles-sur-Blaise (French pronunciation: [kuʁsɛl syʁ blɛz], literally Courcelles on Blaise) is a commune in the Haute-Marne department in north-eastern France.

== Geography ==
The river Blaise flows through the commune.

== See also ==
- Communes of the Haute-Marne department
