= Johnny Blaze (disambiguation) =

Johnny Blaze is one of several Marvel Comics characters to use the pseudonym "Ghost Rider".

Johnny Blaze may also refer to:

- Johnny Blaze, a ring name of John Morrison (wrestler)
- Johnny Blaze, an alter-ego of American rapper Method Man

== See also ==
- Johnny Blais (1971–2007), American triathlete, also known as Blazeman, originator of the Blazeman roll
