= Blazing =

Blazing or blazin' may refer to:

- Blazing, concentrating light dispersed by a diffraction grating
- Blazing, a slang term for smoking cannabis
- Blazing, a 2011 album by Jenny Wilson
- "Blazin'" (song), a 2010 song by Nicki Minaj
- "Blazin'", a song by Alison Hinds from the album Soca Queen, 2007
- "Blazin'", a song by In This Moment from the album A Star-Crossed Wasteland, 2010
- "Blazin'", a 2004 song by MC Tali
- "Blazin'", a 2007 song by Bliss n Eso
- "Blazin'", a 2007 song by Ghislain Poirier
- Lauren Blazing (born 1992), American field hockey player
- Trail blazing, the practice of marking outdoor pathways

== See also ==
- Blazing Saddles, 1974 American satirical western black comedy movie
- Blazing star (disambiguation)
