= Blaize (surname) =

Blaize is a surname. Notable people with the surname include:

- Herbert Blaize (1918–1989), Grenadian politician
- Immodesty Blaize (born 1978), English burlesque dancer
- Richard Beale Blaize (1844–1904), Nigerian-Sierra Leonean businessman, newspaper publisher, and financier
