= Braux =

Braux may refer to the following places in France:

- Braux, Alpes-de-Haute-Provence, a commune in the department of Alpes-de-Haute-Provence
- Braux, Aube, a commune in the department of Aube
- Braux, Côte-d'Or, a commune in the department of Côte-d'Or
- Braux-le-Châtel, a commune in the department of Haute-Marne
- Braux-Sainte-Cohière, a commune in the department of Marne
- Braux-Saint-Remy, a commune in the department of Marne
