= Musumecia bettlachensis =

Scientific classification
- Kingdom: Fungi
- Division: Basidiomycota
- Class: Agaricomycetes
- Order: Agaricales
- Family: Pseudoclitocybaceae
- Genus: Musumecia
- Species: M. bettlachensis

Binomial name
- Musumecia bettlachensis Vizzini & Contu (2011)

Species of fungus

Musumecia bettlachensis is a species of agaric (gilled mushroom) in the family Pseudoclitocybaceae. The species was originally described from France and forms whitish, clustered basidiocarps in woodland. DNA analysis indicates that Musumecia bettlachensis is not closely related to species of Clitocybe which it superficially resembles.
