= Pont-la-Ville =

Pont-la-Ville may refer to:

- Pont-la-Ville, Haute-Marne, commune in the Haute-Marne department in north-eastern France
- Pont-la-Ville, Switzerland, municipality in the district of Gruyère in the canton of Fribourg in Switzerland
