= St Joseph's Young Priests Society =

Roman catholic organization

The Vocations Society of St. Joseph (formerly St. Joseph's Young Priests Society) is a Roman Catholic lay organisation which supports the training of young men to become priests. It also promotes the vocation of the laity and fosters a greater understanding and love of the Mass.

It was founded by Olivia Taaffe, who had become administrator and secretary for the Irish branch of Archconfraternity of Saint Joseph at Maranville, France. In 1895 she published an Irish edition of their magazine, with the help of Fr. Joseph Darlington SJ and Fr. Harry Browne, and the St. Joseph's Young Priests Society developed thereafter from the interest it received. The Sheaf is published today as the newsletter for the society. In 2023, the name of the Society changed to the Vocations Society of St. Joseph.

Over its existence the Society has helped students from every Irish diocese, Great Britain, Asia, America and Africa. The Society has branches which meet regularly in many parishes of Ireland. It also hosts an annual pilgrimage to Knock.
