= Olivia Taaffe =

Founder of St Joseph's Young Priests Society

- Born: Olivia Mary Blake; 24 June 1832; Ballyglunin, County Galway
- Died: 3 May 1918 (aged 85); Dublin
- Notable work: Founding religious charity

Olivia Taaffe (24 June 1832 – 3 May 1918) was the founder of St Joseph's Young Priests Society.

== Early life ==
Taaffe was born Olivia Mary Blake on 24 June 1832 in Annagh House, near Tuam, County Galway, Ireland to John Joseph Blake and Elizabeth Bodkin. She was born with a twin brother who did not survive. Her father and mother both came from well to do Catholic families. However shortly after her birth her mother died. She and her sister were raised by two aunts and their grandmother and moved between the family homes in the country and Dublin, living occasionally with cousins. Taaffe was educated at home by French governesses and finished her education in Paris. Her sister went on to become a teacher, Sr Mary Ignatius of the Presentation Sisters in Midleton.

On 29 May 1867 she married John Joseph Taaffe of Smarmore Castle Co. Louth in St. Michael's Church, Dún Laoghaire. They toured Europe for their honeymoon and had an audience with Pope Pius IX. Taaffe ran her husband's estate and was a generous benefactor to the local widows and orphans especially in the period after a minor famine in 1879. Her popularity helped keep tensions reduced during the land wars in the 1880s. Taaffe had a shrine including a stained glass window in honour of St Joseph erected in the local church of St Catherine's, Ballapousta near Ardee.

== Later life ==
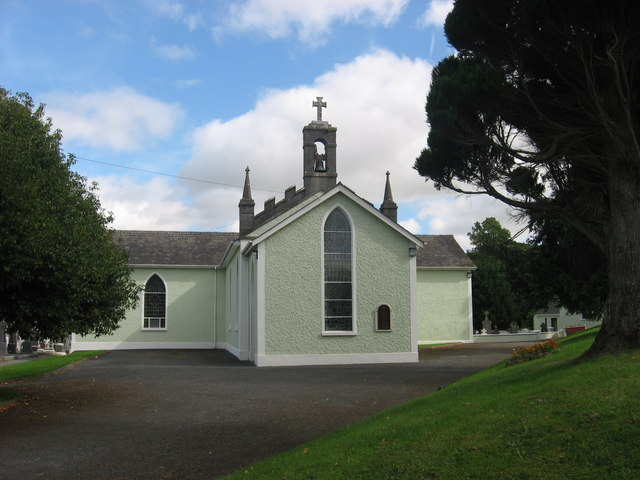
St Catherine's church was built in 1831 and contained Taaffe's gifts and eventually her grave

Her husband always suffered with ill health and died in 1890. Her only son, George Robert, died of tuberculosis in 1894 after his mother took him to Switzerland in an attempt to help him. Because the lands of her husband were entailed his nephew was the new heir to the estates and Taaffe was left homeless and with a limited income. Initially she moved into the Presentation convent in Lucan but she had no intention of becoming a nun. She still had a certain income of her own and used it to move to Dublin. Having spent years involved in charity work, Taaffe focused on it now. From 1867 she had been a friend of Canon Joseph Léon Roy. He had established an archconfraternity and shrine for St. Joseph at Maranville, France. After becoming a widow Taaffe became the administrator and secretary of the Irish branch. She mostly lived in Dublin after that.

In 1895 she arranged for the publication of an Irish edition of the association's magazine and created what went on to become St Joseph's Young Priests Society. They educated young Irish men who wanted to become priests in Asia. Taaffe ensured support of the organisation with successful fund raising events. Her work in establishing the society with Fr Browne and Fr Darlington, the first editors of the magazine, were so successful that the organisation expanded from being able to fund the education of the original 2 men to 36 men by 1923 and had over 100,000 members by 1997 and funded 711 young men.

Taaffe died on 3 May 1918. She is buried with her husband and son at the graveyard at St Catherine's church, Ballapousta, Ardee.
