= Richebourg =

Richebourg may refer to:

== Places ==
Richebourg is the name of several communes in France:

- Richebourg, Haute-Marne, in the Haute-Marne department
- Richebourg, Pas-de-Calais, in the Pas-de-Calais department
- Richebourg, Yvelines, in the Yvelines department
- Richebourg-l'Avoué and Richebourg-Saint-Vaast, former communes of the Pas-de-Calais department, now part of Richebourg

== Other ==
- Richebourg (wine), a Grand cru of Vosne-Romanée
