= Dinteville =

Dinteville may refer to:

== People ==
- François de Dinteville (1498–1530), French Catholic bishop of Auxerre
- François de Dinteville (1498-1554), French bishop of Auxerre, brother of Jean de Dinteville
- Jean de Dinteville (1504–1555), French diplomat

== Places ==
- Dinteville, Haute-Marne, French commune
