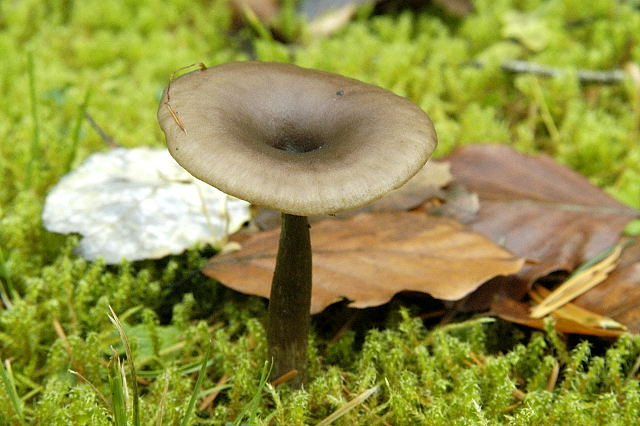
- Pseudoclitocybe cyathiformis, Belgium

Scientific classification
- Kingdom: Fungi
- Division: Basidiomycota
- Class: Agaricomycetes
- Order: Agaricales
- Family: Pseudoclitocybaceae
- Genus: Pseudoclitocybe (Singer) Singer (1956)

Type species
- Pseudoclitocybe cyathiformis (Bull.) Singer (1956)

Synonyms
- Cantharellula subgen. Pseudoclitocybe Singer (1943)

= Pseudoclitocybe =

Genus of fungi

Pseudoclitocybe is a genus of fungi in the family Pseudoclitocybaceae. The genus contains about ten species with a collectively widespread distribution.

== Species ==
- Pseudoclitocybe atra
- Pseudoclitocybe bacillaris
- Pseudoclitocybe beschidica
- Pseudoclitocybe cyathiformis
- Pseudoclitocybe expallens
- Pseudoclitocybe foetida
- Pseudoclitocybe lapalmaensis
- Pseudoclitocybe lenta
- Pseudoclitocybe martipanis
- Pseudoclitocybe obbata
- Pseudoclitocybe parvula
- Pseudoclitocybe sabulophila
- Pseudoclitocybe sphagneti
- Pseudoclitocybe trivialis

== See also ==
- List of Agaricales genera
