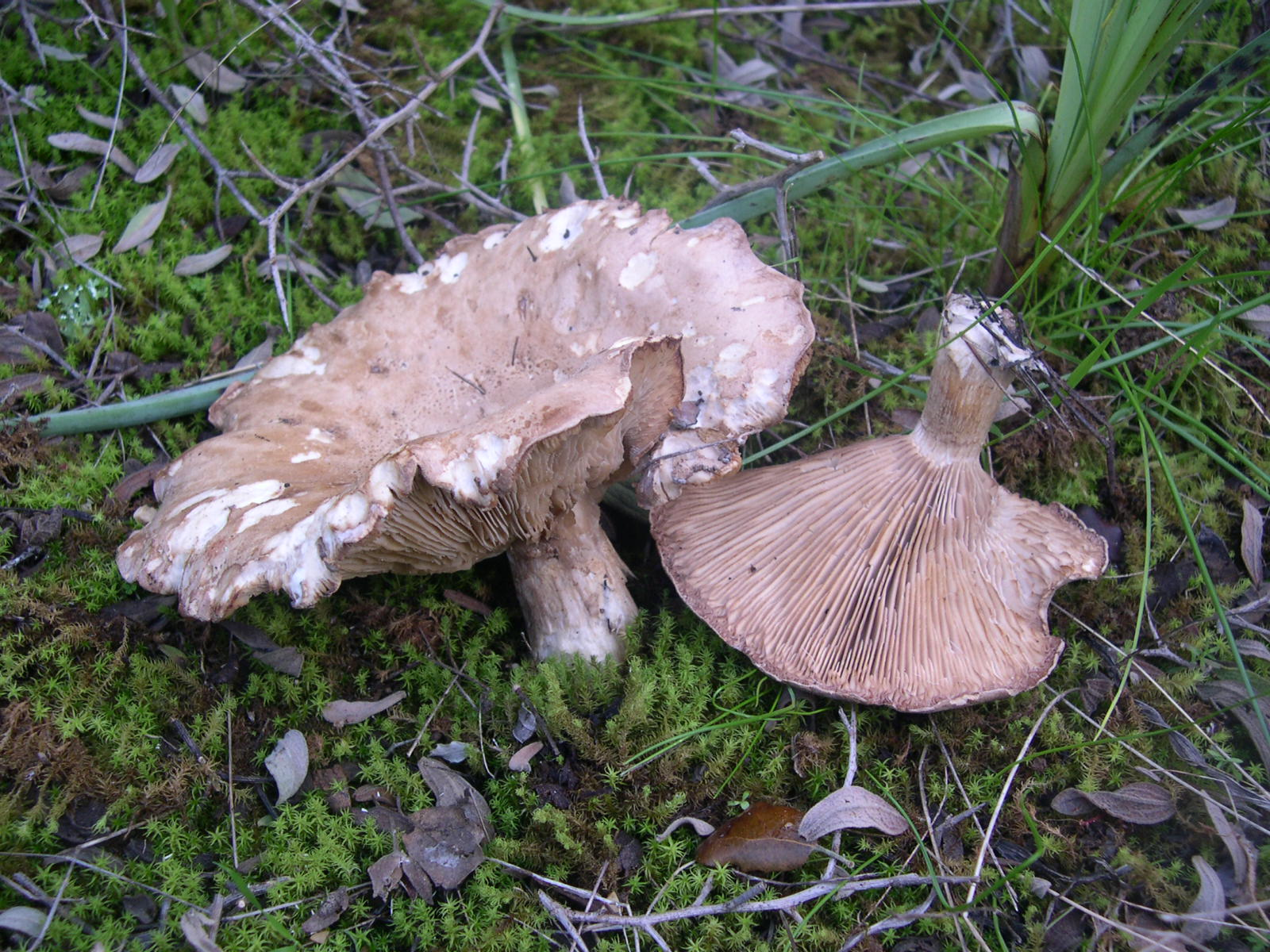
- Clitopaxillus alexandri

Scientific classification
- Kingdom: Fungi
- Division: Basidiomycota
- Class: Agaricomycetes
- Order: Agaricales
- Family: Pseudoclitocybaceae
- Genus: Clitopaxillus
- Species: C. alexandri

Binomial name
- Clitopaxillus alexandri (Gillet) G. Moreno, Vizzini, Consiglio & P. Alvarado (2018)

Synonyms
- Paxillus alexandri Gillet (1873); Lepista alexandri (Gillet) Gillet (1876); Clitocybe alexandri (Gillet) Gillet (1884)

= Clitopaxillus alexandri =

Species of edible fungus

Clitopaxillus alexandri
- Mycological characteristics
- Gills on hymenium
- Cap is convex or umbonate
- Hymenium is decurrent
- Stipe is bare
- Spore print is white
- Ecology is saprotrophic

Clitopaxillus alexandri is a species of fungus in the family Pseudoclitocybaceae. It has been given the recommended English name of Alexander's funnel. Basidiocarps (fruit bodies) are agaricoid and resemble those of Clitocybe species. The species is saprotrophic and is mainly known from Europe.

== Description ==
The pileus (cap) is convex at first becoming umbonate with age, smooth, 50–200 mm in diameter, grey to reddish brown, cracking with age. The lamellae (gills) are decurrent and paler than the pileus. The stipe (stem) is up to 100 mm tall, and yellowish white. The context is whitish with an almond smell. The spore print is white. Microscopically the basidiospores are smooth, ellipsoid, weakly amyloid, and measure 4.5–5.5 x 3.5–4.0 μm.

=== Similar species ===
The recently described Clitopaxillus fibulatus is very similar, but differs microscopically in its slightly larger basidiospores and hyphae with more abundant clamp connections. It also differs in having a subarctic and alpine distribution.

== Habitat and distribution ==
The species typically occurs in leaf litter with pine, oak, and cedar. It was originally described from France and is mostly known from southern, western, and central Europe, extending into North Africa.

== Conservation ==
Clitopaxillus alexandri is assessed as "critically endangered" on the Red Data List of Threatened British Fungi, "vulnerable" on the Dutch red list, and "threatened" or "near threatened" on some other European red lists, including those of Germany, Hungary, and Norway.
