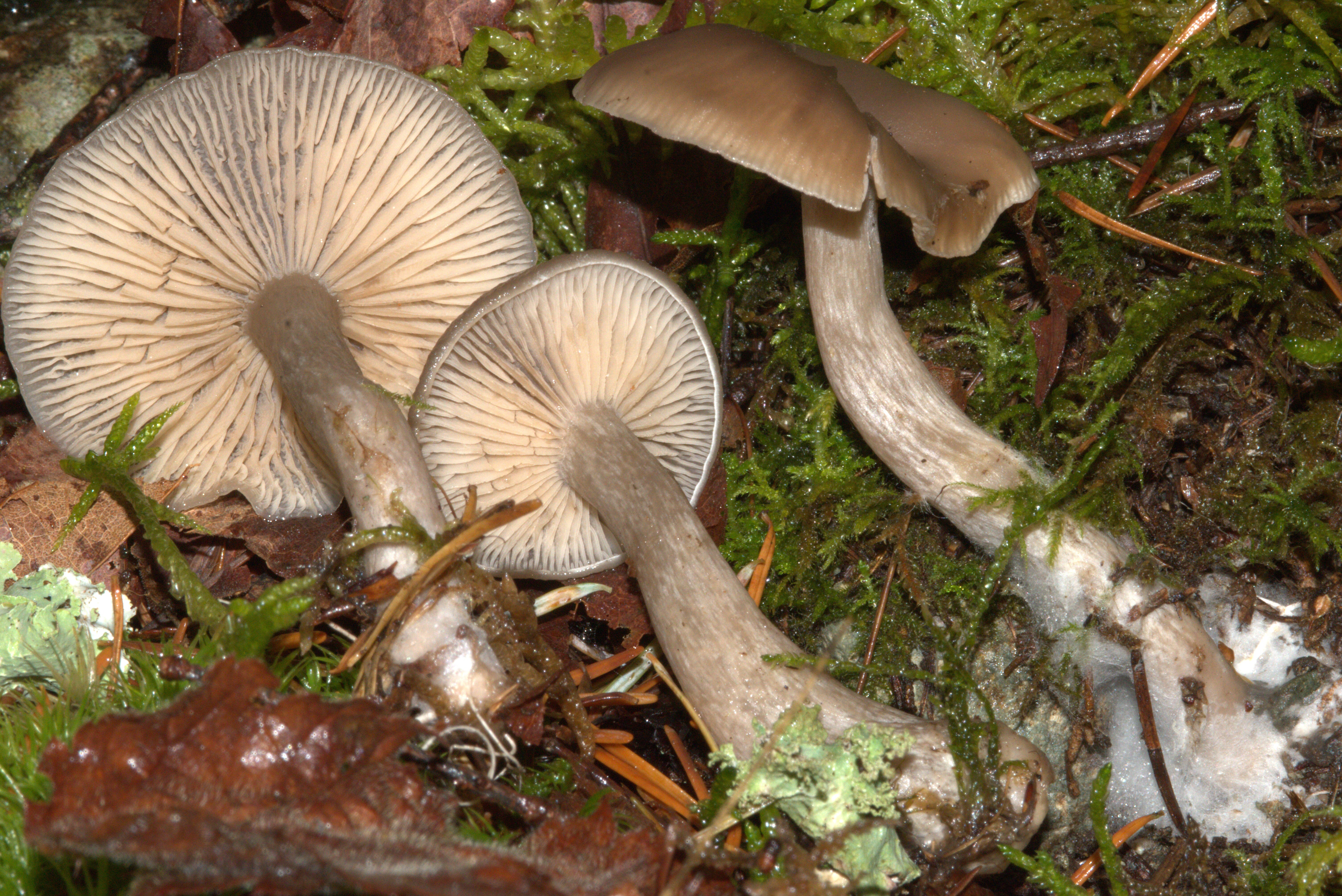

Scientific classification
- Domain: Eukaryota
- Kingdom: Fungi
- Division: Basidiomycota
- Class: Agaricomycetes
- Order: Agaricales
- Family: Pseudoclitocybaceae
- Genus: Pseudoclitocybe
- Species: P. cyathiformis

Binomial name
- Pseudoclitocybe cyathiformis (Bull.) Singer

Synonyms
- 1786 Agaricus cyathiformis Bull. 1871 Clitocybe cyathiformis (Bull.) P.Kumm. 1886 Omphalia cyathiformis (Bull.) Quél. 1936 Cantharellula cyathiformis (Bull.) Singer

= Pseudoclitocybe cyathiformis =

Species of fungus

Pseudoclitocybe cyathiformis, commonly known as the goblet funnel cap, is a species of fungus and the type species of the genus Pseudoclitocybe. It is found in North America and Europe.

== Taxonomy ==
It was first described scientifically as Agaricus cyathiformis by Jean Baptiste François Pierre Bulliard in 1786, and later transferred to the genus Pseudoclitocybe by Rolf Singer in 1956. It is the type species of the genus Pseudoclitocybe.

== Description ==
The cap is up to 8 centimetres (3 1/4 in) wide and brown, fading in age. It is initially centrally depressed with an inrolled margin then becomes funnel-shaped. The gills are adnate to decurrent and pale, becoming gray to brown. The stem may be slightly lighter than the cap and is up to 12 cm (4 3/4 in) long and 1 cm thick, sometimes larger at the base. The spore print is white.

== Distribution and habitat ==
The fungus is found in North America and Europe (September to December), in woodland soil or rotting wood.

== Uses ==
The species is reportedly edible and can be dried for preservation, but resembles a number of species of unknown edibility.
