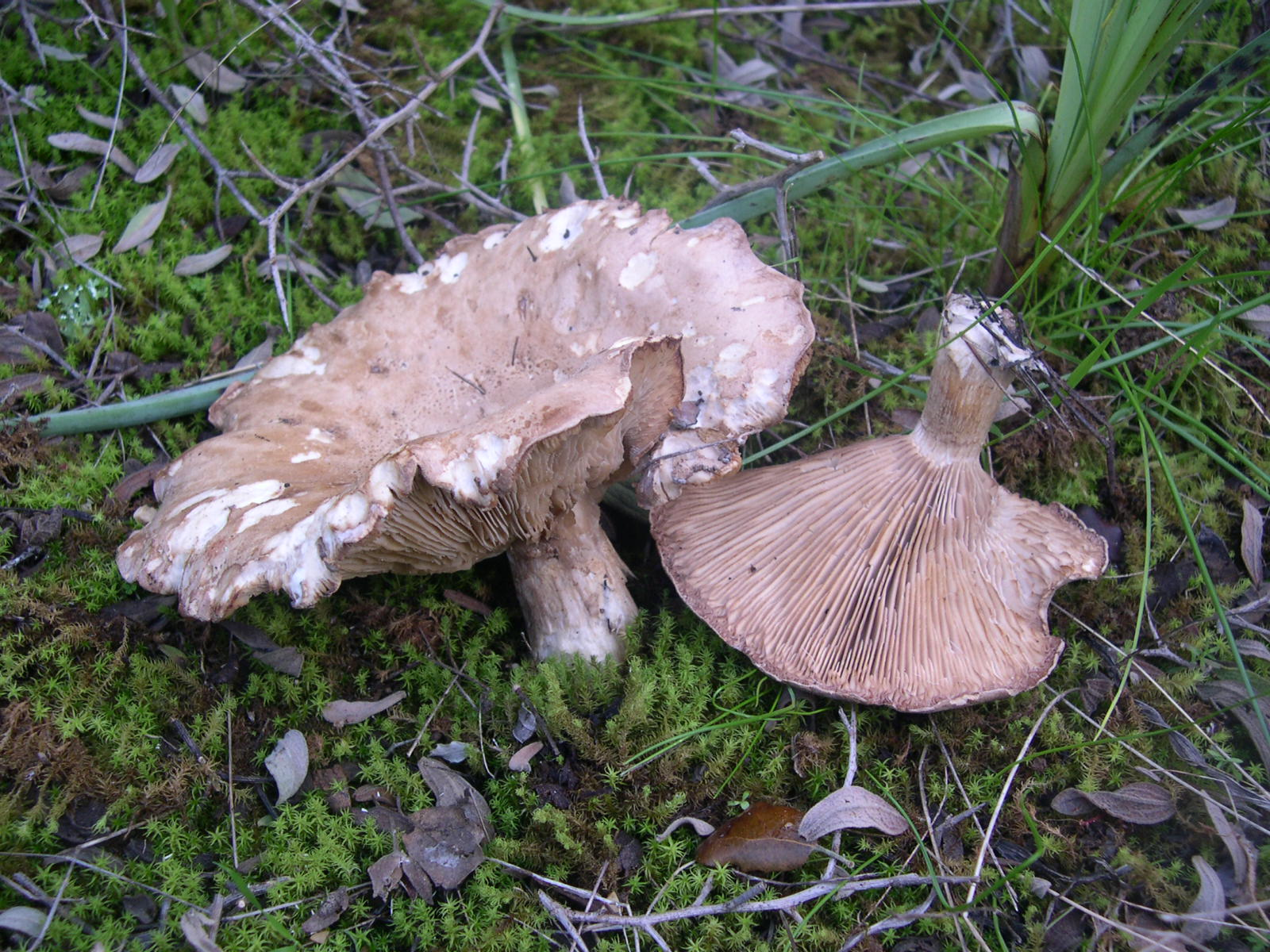
- Clitopaxillus alexandri

Scientific classification
- Kingdom: Fungi
- Division: Basidiomycota
- Class: Agaricomycetes
- Order: Agaricales
- Family: Pseudoclitocybaceae
- Genus: Clitopaxillus; G.Moreno et al.

Type species
- Clitopaxillus alexandri (Gillet) G. Moreno, Vizzini, Consiglio & P. Alvarado

= Clitopaxillus =

Genus of fungi

Clitopaxillus is a genus in the family Pseudoclitocybaceae. Its name is a portmanteau of the names of two other genera of fungi: Clitocybe and Paxillus. There are three species assigned to this genus:

- Clitopaxillus alexandri (Gillet) G. Moreno, Vizzini, Consiglio & P. Alvarado
- Clitopaxillus dabazi L. Fan & H. Liu
- Clitopaxillus fibulatus P.-A. Moreau, Dima, Consiglio & Vizzini
