= Perrogney-les-Fontaines =

- Commune
- Location of Perrogney-les-Fontaines
- Location within France Location within Grand Est
- Coordinates: 47°48′44″N 5°11′57″E
- Country: France
- Region: Grand Est
- Department: Haute-Marne
- Arrondissement: Langres
- Canton: Villegusien-le-Lac
- Intercommunality: Auberive Vingeanne et Montsaugeonnais

Government
  - Mayor (2020–2026): Franck Adam
- Area^{1}: 14.79 km^{2} (5.71 sq mi)
- Elevation: 466 m (1,529 ft)
- Highest elevation: 516 m (1,693 ft)
- Lowest elevation: 420 m (1,380 ft)
- Population (2023): 106
  - Density: 7.17/km^{2} (18.6/sq mi)
- Time zone: UTC+01:00 (CET)
  - Summer (DST): UTC+02:00 (CEST)
- INSEE/Postal code: 52384 /52160
- ^{1} French Land Register data, which excludes lakes, ponds, glaciers > 1 km^{2} (0.386 sq mi or 247 acres) and river estuaries.

Perrogney-les-Fontaines (French pronunciation: [peʁɔɲɛ le fɔ̃tɛn]) is a commune in the Haute-Marne department in north-eastern France.

== Geography ==
The Aujon has its source in the commune.

== See also ==
- Communes of the Haute-Marne department
