= Vaudrémont =

- Commune
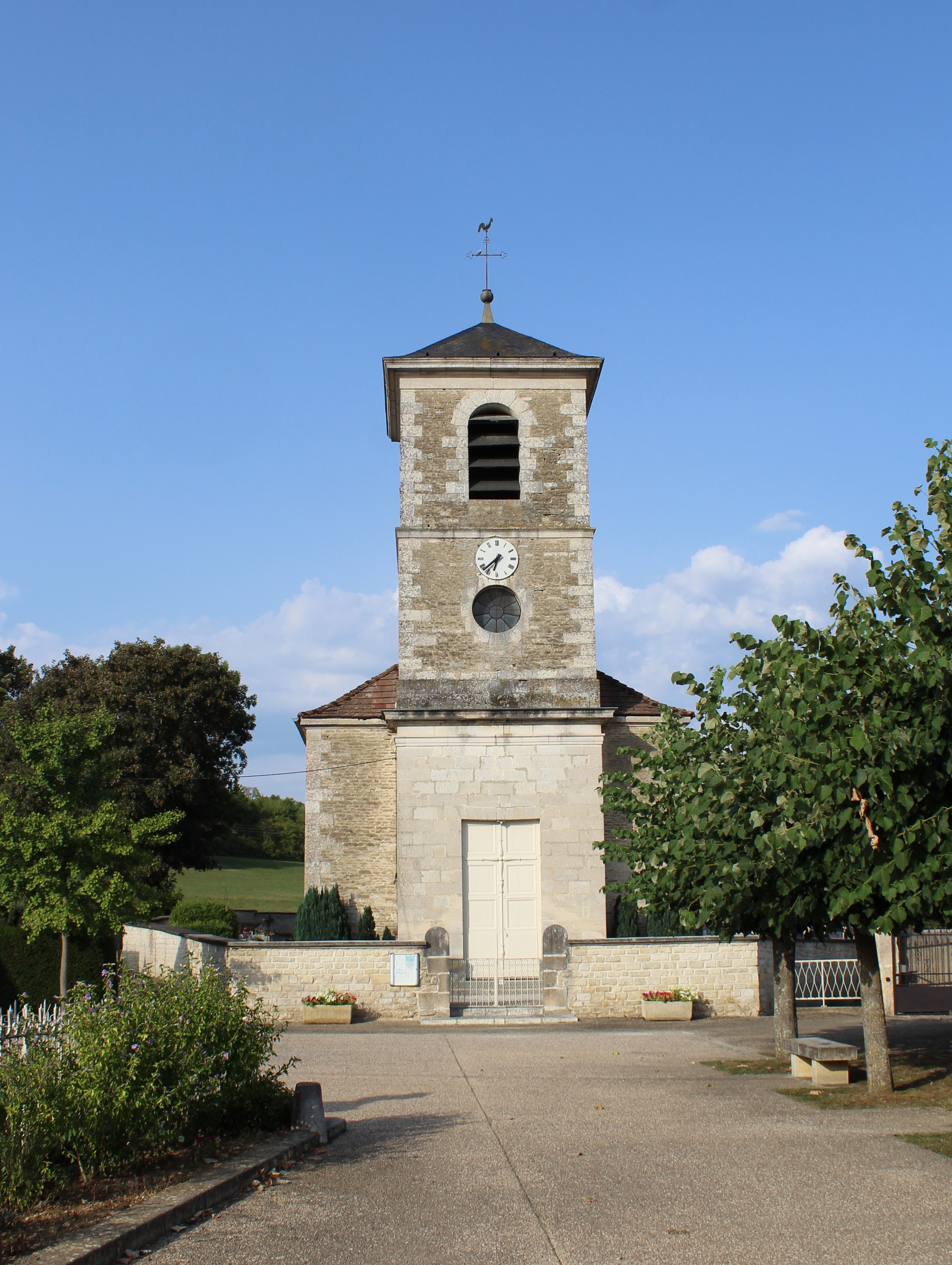
- The church in Vaudrémont
- Location of Vaudrémont
- Location within France Location within Grand Est
- Coordinates: 48°07′45″N 4°54′20″E
- Country: France
- Region: Grand Est
- Department: Haute-Marne
- Arrondissement: Chaumont
- Canton: Châteauvillain
- Intercommunality: CC des Trois Forêts

Government
  - Mayor (2020–2026): Alain Bacarat
- Area^{1}: 10.39 km^{2} (4.01 sq mi)
- Elevation: 215 m (705 ft)
- Population (2023): 81
  - Density: 7.8/km^{2} (20/sq mi)
- Time zone: UTC+01:00 (CET)
  - Summer (DST): UTC+02:00 (CEST)
- INSEE/Postal code: 52506 /52330
- ^{1} French Land Register data, which excludes lakes, ponds, glaciers > 1 km^{2} (0.386 sq mi or 247 acres) and river estuaries.

Vaudrémont (French pronunciation: [vodʁemɔ̃]) is a commune in the Haute-Marne department in north-eastern France.

== See also ==
- Communes of the Haute-Marne department
