= Bricon =

- Commune
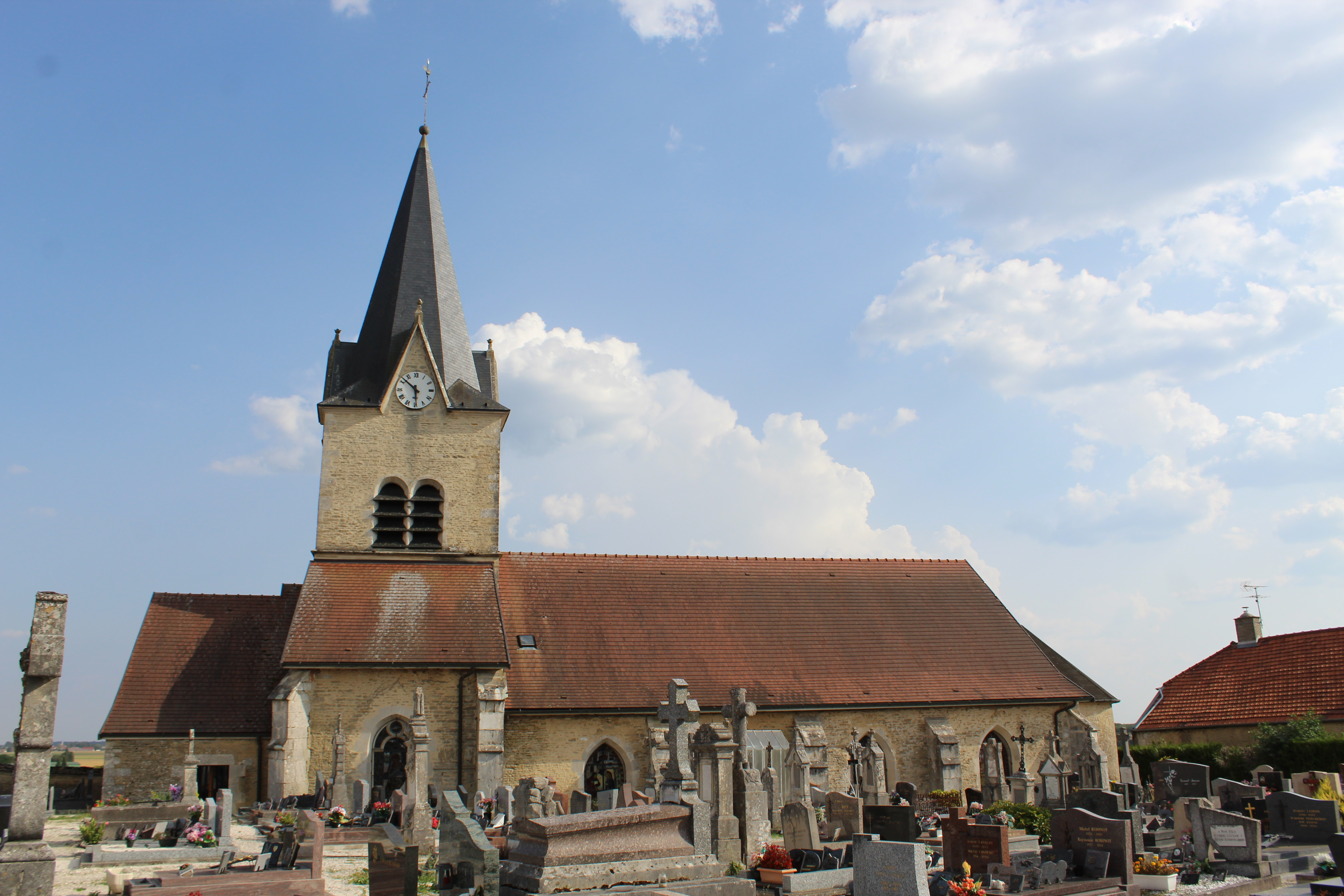
- The church in Bricon

- Coat of arms
- Location of Bricon
- Location within France Location within Grand Est
- Coordinates: 48°04′54″N 4°58′43″E
- Country: France
- Region: Grand Est
- Department: Haute-Marne
- Arrondissement: Chaumont
- Canton: Châteauvillain

Government
  - Mayor (2020–2026): Franck Duhoux
- Area^{1}: 9.51 km^{2} (3.67 sq mi)
- Elevation: 250 m (820 ft)
- Population (2023): 407
  - Density: 42.8/km^{2} (111/sq mi)
- Time zone: UTC+01:00 (CET)
  - Summer (DST): UTC+02:00 (CEST)
- INSEE/Postal code: 52076 /52120
- ^{1} French Land Register data, which excludes lakes, ponds, glaciers > 1 km^{2} (0.386 sq mi or 247 acres) and river estuaries.

Bricon (French pronunciation: [bʁikɔ̃]) is a commune in the Haute-Marne department in northeastern France.

== Population ==
Historical population
| Year | Pop. | ±% p.a. |
|---|---|---|
| 1968 | 421 | — |
| 1975 | 381 | −1.42% |
| 1982 | 355 | −1.00% |
| 1990 | 423 | +2.21% |
| 1999 | 455 | +0.81% |
| 2007 | 432 | −0.65% |
| 2012 | 474 | +1.87% |
| 2017 | 449 | −1.08% |
| 2023 | 407 | −1.62% |
Source: INSEE

== See also ==
- Communes of the Haute-Marne department
