= Coupray =

- Commune
- Location of Coupray
- Location within France Location within Grand Est
- Coordinates: 47°58′35″N 4°56′39″E
- Country: France
- Region: Grand Est
- Department: Haute-Marne
- Arrondissement: Chaumont
- Canton: Châteauvillain
- Intercommunality: CC des Trois Forêts

Government
  - Mayor (2020–2026): Roland Thery
- Area^{1}: 12.1 km^{2} (4.7 sq mi)
- Elevation: 252 m (827 ft)
- Population (2023): 173
  - Density: 14.3/km^{2} (37.0/sq mi)
- Time zone: UTC+01:00 (CET)
  - Summer (DST): UTC+02:00 (CEST)
- INSEE/Postal code: 52146 /52210
- ^{1} French Land Register data, which excludes lakes, ponds, glaciers > 1 km^{2} (0.386 sq mi or 247 acres) and river estuaries.

Coupray (French pronunciation: [kupʁɛ]) is a commune in the Haute-Marne department in north-eastern France.

== Geography ==
The Aujon flows northwestward through the middle of the commune and crosses the village.

== See also ==
- Communes of the Haute-Marne department
