= Canton of Châteauvillain =

Coordinates: 48.04°N 4.92°E

The canton of Châteauvillain is an administrative division of the Haute-Marne department, northeastern France. Its borders were modified at the French canton reorganisation which came into effect in March 2015. Its seat is in Châteauvillain.

It consists of the following communes:

1. Aizanville
2. Arc-en-Barrois
3. Aubepierre-sur-Aube
4. Autreville-sur-la-Renne
5. Blaisy
6. Blessonville
7. Braux-le-Châtel
8. Bricon
9. Bugnières
10. Châteauvillain
11. Cirfontaines-en-Azois
12. Colombey-les-Deux-Églises
13. Coupray
14. Cour-l'Évêque
15. Curmont
16. Dancevoir
17. Dinteville
18. Giey-sur-Aujon
19. Gillancourt
20. Juzennecourt
21. Lachapelle-en-Blaisy
22. Laferté-sur-Aube
23. Lanty-sur-Aube
24. Latrecey-Ormoy-sur-Aube
25. Lavilleneuve-au-Roi
26. Leffonds
27. Maranville
28. Montheries
29. Orges
30. Pont-la-Ville
31. Rennepont
32. Richebourg
33. Rizaucourt-Buchey
34. Silvarouvres
35. Vaudrémont
36. Villars-en-Azois
37. Villiers-sur-Suize
