= Villars-en-Azois =

- Commune
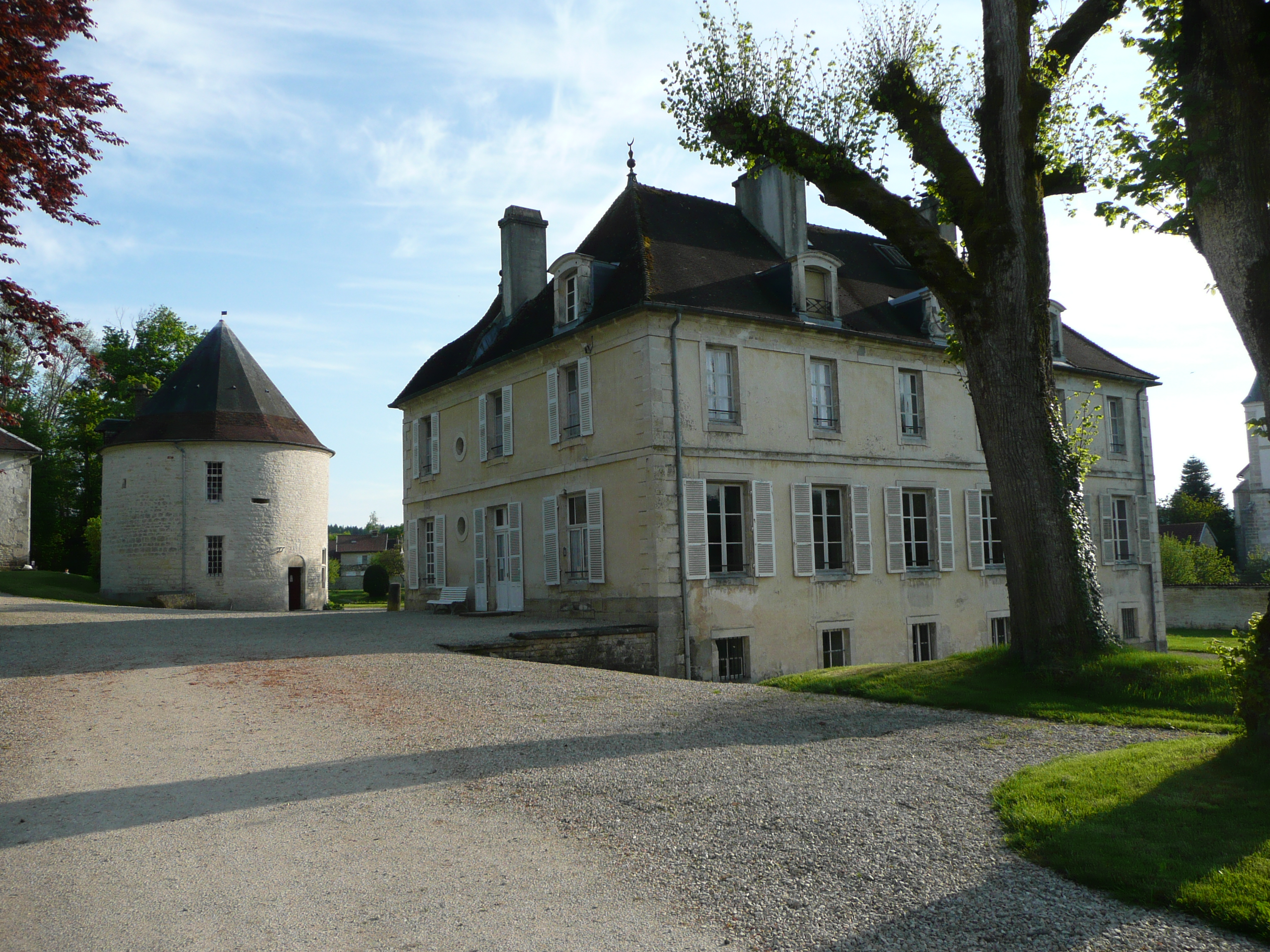
- The chateau in Villars-en-Azois
- Location of Villars-en-Azois
- Location within France Location within Grand Est
- Coordinates: 48°04′05″N 4°44′42″E
- Country: France
- Region: Grand Est
- Department: Haute-Marne
- Arrondissement: Chaumont
- Canton: Châteauvillain
- Intercommunality: CC des Trois Forêts

Government
  - Mayor (2020–2026): Gilles Hanuszek
- Area^{1}: 19.52 km^{2} (7.54 sq mi)
- Elevation: 230 m (750 ft)
- Population (2023): 58
  - Density: 3.0/km^{2} (7.7/sq mi)
- Time zone: UTC+01:00 (CET)
  - Summer (DST): UTC+02:00 (CEST)
- INSEE/Postal code: 52525 /52120
- ^{1} French Land Register data, which excludes lakes, ponds, glaciers > 1 km^{2} (0.386 sq mi or 247 acres) and river estuaries.

Villars-en-Azois is a commune in the Haute-Marne department in north-eastern France.

== See also ==
- Communes of the Haute-Marne department
