= Bugnières =

- Commune
- Location of Bugnières
- Location within France Location within Grand Est
- Coordinates: 47°56′41″N 5°06′08″E
- Country: France
- Region: Grand Est
- Department: Haute-Marne
- Arrondissement: Chaumont
- Canton: Châteauvillain
- Intercommunality: Trois Forêts

Government
  - Mayor (2020–2026): Guy Jacob
- Area^{1}: 18.29 km^{2} (7.06 sq mi)
- Elevation: 323 m (1,060 ft)
- Population (2023): 153
  - Density: 8.37/km^{2} (21.7/sq mi)
- Time zone: UTC+01:00 (CET)
  - Summer (DST): UTC+02:00 (CEST)
- INSEE/Postal code: 52082 /52210
- ^{1} French Land Register data, which excludes lakes, ponds, glaciers > 1 km^{2} (0.386 sq mi or 247 acres) and river estuaries.

Bugnières (French pronunciation: [byɲɛʁ]) is a commune in the Haute-Marne department in northeastern France.

== Population ==
Historical population
| Year | Pop. | ±% p.a. |
|---|---|---|
| 1968 | 136 | — |
| 1975 | 129 | −0.75% |
| 1982 | 126 | −0.34% |
| 1990 | 123 | −0.30% |
| 1999 | 110 | −1.23% |
| 2007 | 152 | +4.13% |
| 2012 | 151 | −0.13% |
| 2017 | 153 | +0.26% |
| 2023 | 153 | +0.00% |
Source: INSEE

== See also ==
- Communes of the Haute-Marne department
