= Aizanville =

- Commune
- Location of Aizanville
- Location within France Location within Grand Est
- Coordinates: 48°06′29″N 4°53′46″E
- Country: France
- Region: Grand Est
- Department: Haute-Marne
- Arrondissement: Chaumont
- Canton: Châteauvillain
- Intercommunality: Trois Forêts

Government
  - Mayor (2020–2026): Jean-Michel Guerber
- Area^{1}: 3.5 km^{2} (1.4 sq mi)
- Elevation: 210 m (690 ft)
- Population (2023): 23
  - Density: 6.6/km^{2} (17/sq mi)
- Time zone: UTC+01:00 (CET)
  - Summer (DST): UTC+02:00 (CEST)
- INSEE/Postal code: 52005 /52120
- ^{1} French Land Register data, which excludes lakes, ponds, glaciers > 1 km^{2} (0.386 sq mi or 247 acres) and river estuaries.

Aizanville (French pronunciation: [ɛzɑ̃vil]) is a commune in the Haute-Marne department in the Grand Est region in northeastern France.

== Geography ==
The village lies on the right bank of the Aujon, which forms part of the commune's western border.

== Population ==
Historical population
Year	Pop.	±% p.a.
1968	55	—
1975	39	−4.79%
1982	37	−0.75%
1990	35	−0.69%
1999	25	−3.67%
2007	25	+0.00%
2012	32	+5.06%
2017	34	+1.22%
2023	23	−6.31%
Source: INSEE

== See also ==
- Communes of the Haute-Marne department
