= Giey-sur-Aujon =

- Commune
- Coat of arms
- Location of Giey-sur-Aujon
- Location within France Location within Grand Est
- Coordinates: 47°54′26″N 5°04′14″E
- Country: France
- Region: Grand Est
- Department: Haute-Marne
- Arrondissement: Chaumont
- Canton: Châteauvillain
- Intercommunality: CC des Trois Forêts

Government
  - Mayor (2020–2026): Yvette Rossigneux
- Area^{1}: 30.42 km^{2} (11.75 sq mi)
- Elevation: 299 m (981 ft)
- Population (2023): 139
  - Density: 4.57/km^{2} (11.8/sq mi)
- Time zone: UTC+01:00 (CET)
  - Summer (DST): UTC+02:00 (CEST)
- INSEE/Postal code: 52220 /52210
- ^{1} French Land Register data, which excludes lakes, ponds, glaciers > 1 km^{2} (0.386 sq mi or 247 acres) and river estuaries.

Giey-sur-Aujon (French pronunciation: [ʒjɛ syʁ oʒɔ̃], literally Giey on Aujon) is a commune in the Haute-Marne department in north-eastern France.

== Geography ==
The Aujon flows northwestward through the middle of the commune; the village lies on its left bank.

== See also ==
- Communes of the Haute-Marne department
