= Rennepont =

- Commune
- Coat of arms
- Location of Rennepont
- Location within France Location within Grand Est
- Coordinates: 48°08′55″N 4°51′21″E
- Country: France
- Region: Grand Est
- Department: Haute-Marne
- Arrondissement: Chaumont
- Canton: Châteauvillain
- Intercommunality: CA Chaumont

Government
  - Mayor (2020–2026): Stéphane Martinelli
- Area^{1}: 11.98 km^{2} (4.63 sq mi)
- Elevation: 195 m (640 ft)
- Population (2023): 117
  - Density: 9.77/km^{2} (25.3/sq mi)
- Demonym(s): Rennepontais, Rennepontaises
- Time zone: UTC+01:00 (CET)
  - Summer (DST): UTC+02:00 (CEST)
- INSEE/Postal code: 52419 /52370
- ^{1} French Land Register data, which excludes lakes, ponds, glaciers > 1 km^{2} (0.386 sq mi or 247 acres) and river estuaries.

Rennepont (French pronunciation: [ʁɛnpɔ̃]) is a commune in the Haute-Marne department in north-eastern France.

== Geography ==
The Aujon forms most of the commune's southern border.

== See also ==
- Communes of the Haute-Marne department
