= Rochetaillée =

- Commune
- Location of Rochetaillée
- Location within France Location within Grand Est
- Coordinates: 47°51′47″N 5°06′59″E
- Country: France
- Region: Grand Est
- Department: Haute-Marne
- Arrondissement: Langres
- Canton: Villegusien-le-Lac
- Intercommunality: Auberive Vingeanne et Montsaugeonnais

Government
  - Mayor (2020–2026): Yannick Legros
- Area^{1}: 27.95 km^{2} (10.79 sq mi)
- Elevation: 335 m (1,099 ft)
- Highest elevation: 483 m (1,585 ft)
- Lowest elevation: 318 m (1,043 ft)
- Population (2023): 151
  - Density: 5.40/km^{2} (14.0/sq mi)
- Time zone: UTC+01:00 (CET)
  - Summer (DST): UTC+02:00 (CEST)
- INSEE/Postal code: 52431 /52210
- ^{1} French Land Register data, which excludes lakes, ponds, glaciers > 1 km^{2} (0.386 sq mi or 247 acres) and river estuaries.

Rochetaillée (French pronunciation: [ʁɔʃtaje]) is a commune in the Haute-Marne department in north-eastern France.

== Geography ==
The Aujon flows north-northwestward through the middle of the commune. It crosses the two villages of the commune: Chameroy and Rochetaillée.

== See also ==
- Communes of the Haute-Marne department
