= Cirfontaines-en-Azois =

- Commune
- Coat of arms
- Location of Cirfontaines-en-Azois
- Location within France Location within Grand Est
- Coordinates: 48°06′37″N 4°52′27″E
- Country: France
- Region: Grand Est
- Department: Haute-Marne
- Arrondissement: Chaumont
- Canton: Châteauvillain
- Intercommunality: CC des Trois Forêts

Government
  - Mayor (2020–2026): Dominique Poupot
- Area^{1}: 11.61 km^{2} (4.48 sq mi)
- Elevation: 235 m (771 ft)
- Population (2023): 180
  - Density: 16/km^{2} (40/sq mi)
- Time zone: UTC+01:00 (CET)
  - Summer (DST): UTC+02:00 (CEST)
- INSEE/Postal code: 52130 /52370
- ^{1} French Land Register data, which excludes lakes, ponds, glaciers > 1 km^{2} (0.386 sq mi or 247 acres) and river estuaries.

Cirfontaines-en-Azois is a commune in the Haute-Marne department in north-eastern France.

== Geography ==
The Aujon forms part of the commune's eastern border.

== See also ==
- Communes of the Haute-Marne department
