= Leffonds =

- Commune
- Location of Leffonds
- Location within France Location within Grand Est
- Coordinates: 47°58′27″N 5°09′46″E
- Country: France
- Region: Grand Est
- Department: Haute-Marne
- Arrondissement: Chaumont
- Canton: Châteauvillain

Government
  - Mayor (2020–2026): Mariette Voillot
- Area^{1}: 36.24 km^{2} (13.99 sq mi)
- Elevation: 355 m (1,165 ft)
- Population (2023): 344
  - Density: 9.49/km^{2} (24.6/sq mi)
- Time zone: UTC+01:00 (CET)
  - Summer (DST): UTC+02:00 (CEST)
- INSEE/Postal code: 52282 /52210
- ^{1} French Land Register data, which excludes lakes, ponds, glaciers > 1 km^{2} (0.386 sq mi or 247 acres) and river estuaries.

Leffonds (French pronunciation: [lefɔ̃]) is a commune in the Haute-Marne department in north-eastern France.

== See also ==
- Communes of the Haute-Marne department
