= Longchamp-sur-Aujon =

Commune in Grand Est, France

- Commune
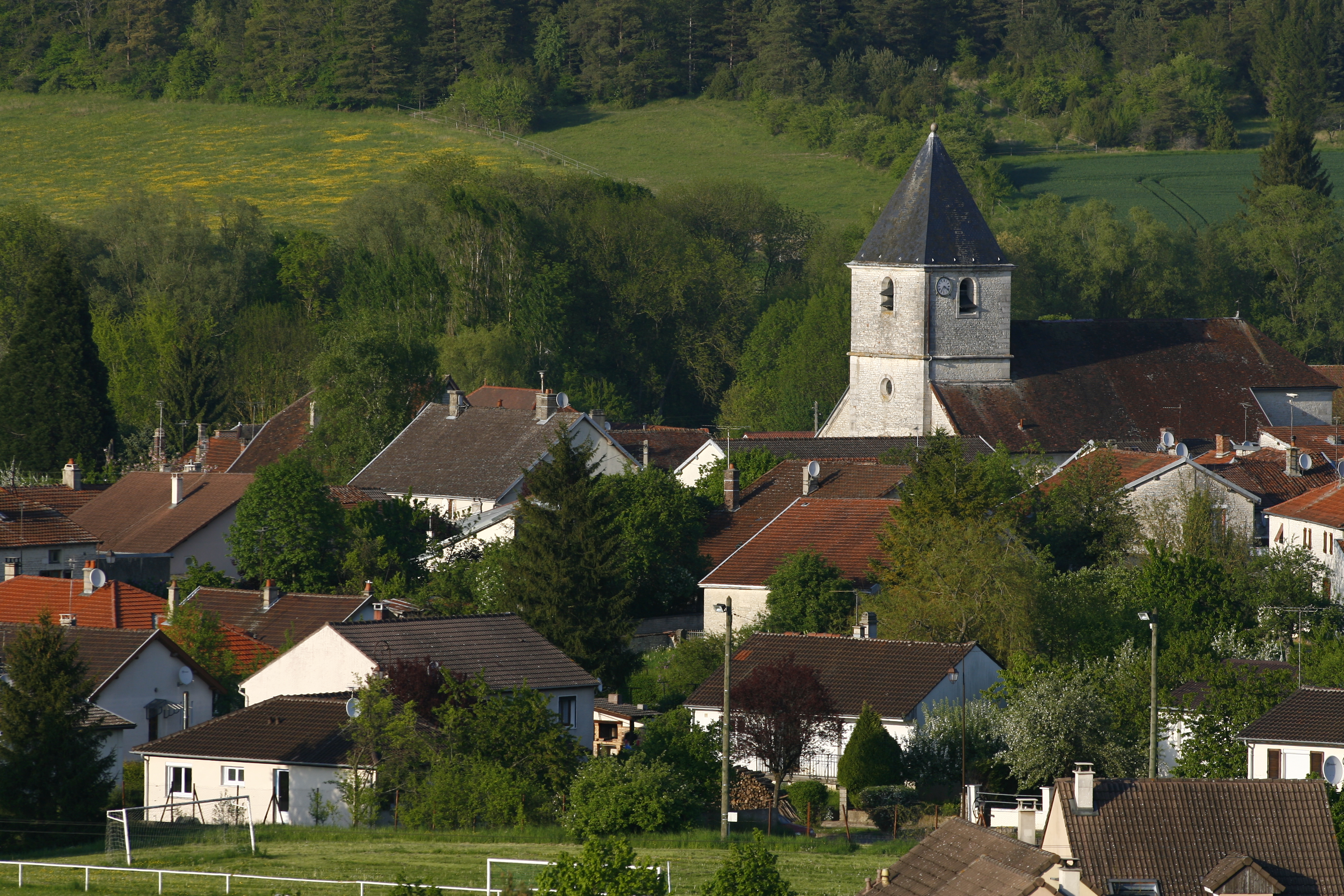
- A general view of Longchamp-sur-Aujon
- Location of Longchamp-sur-Aujon
- Location within France Location within Grand Est
- Coordinates: 48°09′03″N 4°49′55″E
- Country: France
- Region: Grand Est
- Department: Aube
- Arrondissement: Bar-sur-Aube
- Canton: Bar-sur-Aube
- Intercommunality: Région de Bar-sur-Aube

Government
  - Mayor (2020–2026): Patrick Mary
- Area^{1}: 16.39 km^{2} (6.33 sq mi)
- Elevation: 192 m (630 ft)
- Highest elevation: 334 m (1,096 ft)
- Lowest elevation: 192 m (630 ft)
- Population (2023): 361
  - Density: 22.0/km^{2} (57.0/sq mi)
- Time zone: UTC+01:00 (CET)
  - Summer (DST): UTC+02:00 (CEST)
- INSEE/Postal code: 10203 /10310
- ^{1} French Land Register data, which excludes lakes, ponds, glaciers > 1 km^{2} (0.386 sq mi or 247 acres) and river estuaries.

Longchamp-sur-Aujon (French pronunciation: [lɔ̃ʃɑ̃ syʁ oʒɔ̃], literally Longchamp on Aujon) is a commune in the Aube department in north-central France.

== Geography ==
The Aujon forms part of the commune's eastern border, crosses the village, flows west through the middle of the commune, then flows into the Aube, which forms the commune's western border.

== Population ==
Historical population
Year	Pop.	±% p.a.
1968	683	—
1975	675	−0.17%
1982	599	−1.69%
1990	522	−1.71%
1999	450	−1.64%
2007	412	−1.10%
2012	444	+1.51%
2017	420	−1.11%
2023	361	−2.49%
Source: INSEE

== See also ==
- Communes of the Aube department
