= Saint-Loup-sur-Aujon =

- Commune
- Location of Saint-Loup-sur-Aujon
- Location within France Location within Grand Est
- Coordinates: 47°53′21″N 5°05′23″E
- Country: France
- Region: Grand Est
- Department: Haute-Marne
- Arrondissement: Langres
- Canton: Villegusien-le-Lac
- Intercommunality: Auberive Vingeanne et Montsaugeonnais

Government
  - Mayor (2023–2026): Bénigne Cunier
- Area^{1}: 19.33 km^{2} (7.46 sq mi)
- Elevation: 347 m (1,138 ft)
- Highest elevation: 448 m (1,470 ft)
- Lowest elevation: 300 m (980 ft)
- Population (2023): 128
  - Density: 6.62/km^{2} (17.2/sq mi)
- Time zone: UTC+01:00 (CET)
  - Summer (DST): UTC+02:00 (CEST)
- INSEE/Postal code: 52450 /52210
- ^{1} French Land Register data, which excludes lakes, ponds, glaciers > 1 km^{2} (0.386 sq mi or 247 acres) and river estuaries.

Saint-Loup-sur-Aujon (French pronunciation: [sɛ̃ lu syʁ oʒɔ̃], literally Saint-Loup on Aujon) is a commune in the Haute-Marne department in north-eastern France.

== Geography ==
The Aujon flows northwestward through the middle of the commune; it crosses the two villages of the commune: Saint-Loup-sur-Aujon and Courcelles-sur-Aujon.

== See also ==
- Communes of the Haute-Marne department
