= Cour-l'Évêque =

- Commune
- Location of Cour-l'Évêque
- Location within France Location within Grand Est
- Coordinates: 47°58′03″N 4°58′36″E
- Country: France
- Region: Grand Est
- Department: Haute-Marne
- Arrondissement: Chaumont
- Canton: Châteauvillain
- Intercommunality: CC des Trois Forêts

Government
  - Mayor (2020–2026): Guy Béguinot
- Area^{1}: 18.95 km^{2} (7.32 sq mi)
- Elevation: 265 m (869 ft)
- Population (2023): 148
  - Density: 7.81/km^{2} (20.2/sq mi)
- Time zone: UTC+01:00 (CET)
  - Summer (DST): UTC+02:00 (CEST)
- INSEE/Postal code: 52151 /52210
- ^{1} French Land Register data, which excludes lakes, ponds, glaciers > 1 km^{2} (0.386 sq mi or 247 acres) and river estuaries.

Cour-l'Évêque (French pronunciation: [kuʁ levɛk]) is a commune in the Haute-Marne department in north-eastern France.

== Geography ==
The village lies on the right bank of the Aujon, which flows northwestward through the southern part of the commune.

== See also ==
- Communes of the Haute-Marne department
