= Orges, Haute-Marne =

Orges
- Commune
- Coat of arms
- Location of Orges
- Location within France Location within Grand Est
- Coordinates: 48°04′54″N 4°55′42″E
- Country: France
- Region: Grand Est
- Department: Haute-Marne
- Arrondissement: Chaumont
- Canton: Châteauvillain
- Intercommunality: CC des Trois Forêts

Government
  - Mayor (2020–2026): Claude Gagneux
- Area^{1}: 17.52 km^{2} (6.76 sq mi)
- Elevation: 220 m (720 ft)
- Population (2023): 361
  - Density: 20.6/km^{2} (53.4/sq mi)
- Time zone: UTC+01:00 (CET)
  - Summer (DST): UTC+02:00 (CEST)
- INSEE/Postal code: 52365 /52120
- ^{1} French Land Register data, which excludes lakes, ponds, glaciers > 1 km^{2} (0.386 sq mi or 247 acres) and river estuaries.

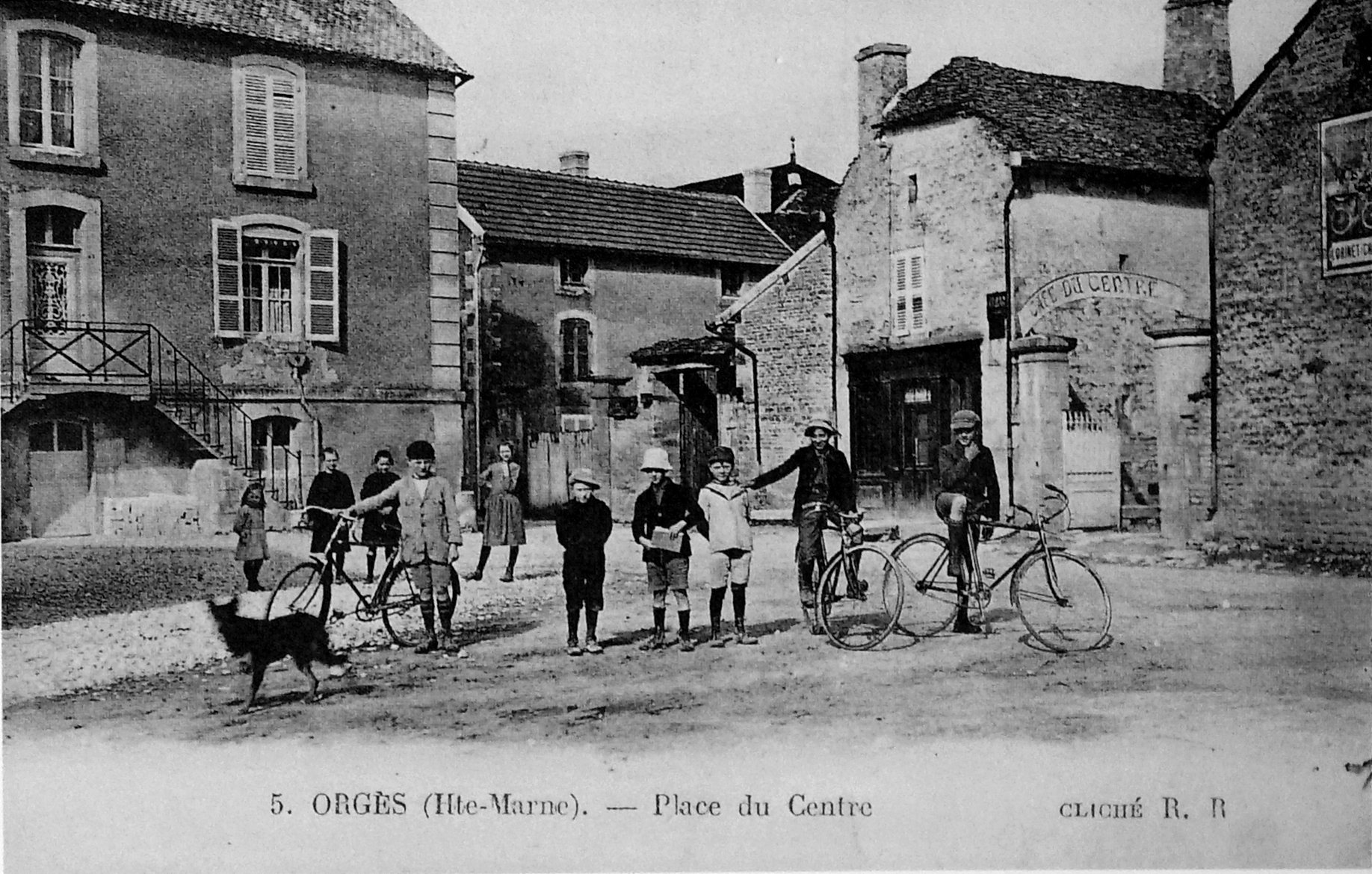
Orges

Orges (French pronunciation: [ɔʁʒ]) is a commune in the Haute-Marne department in north-eastern France.

== Geography ==
The Aujon forms part of the commune's north-western border.

== See also ==
- Communes of the Haute-Marne department
