= Aujon =

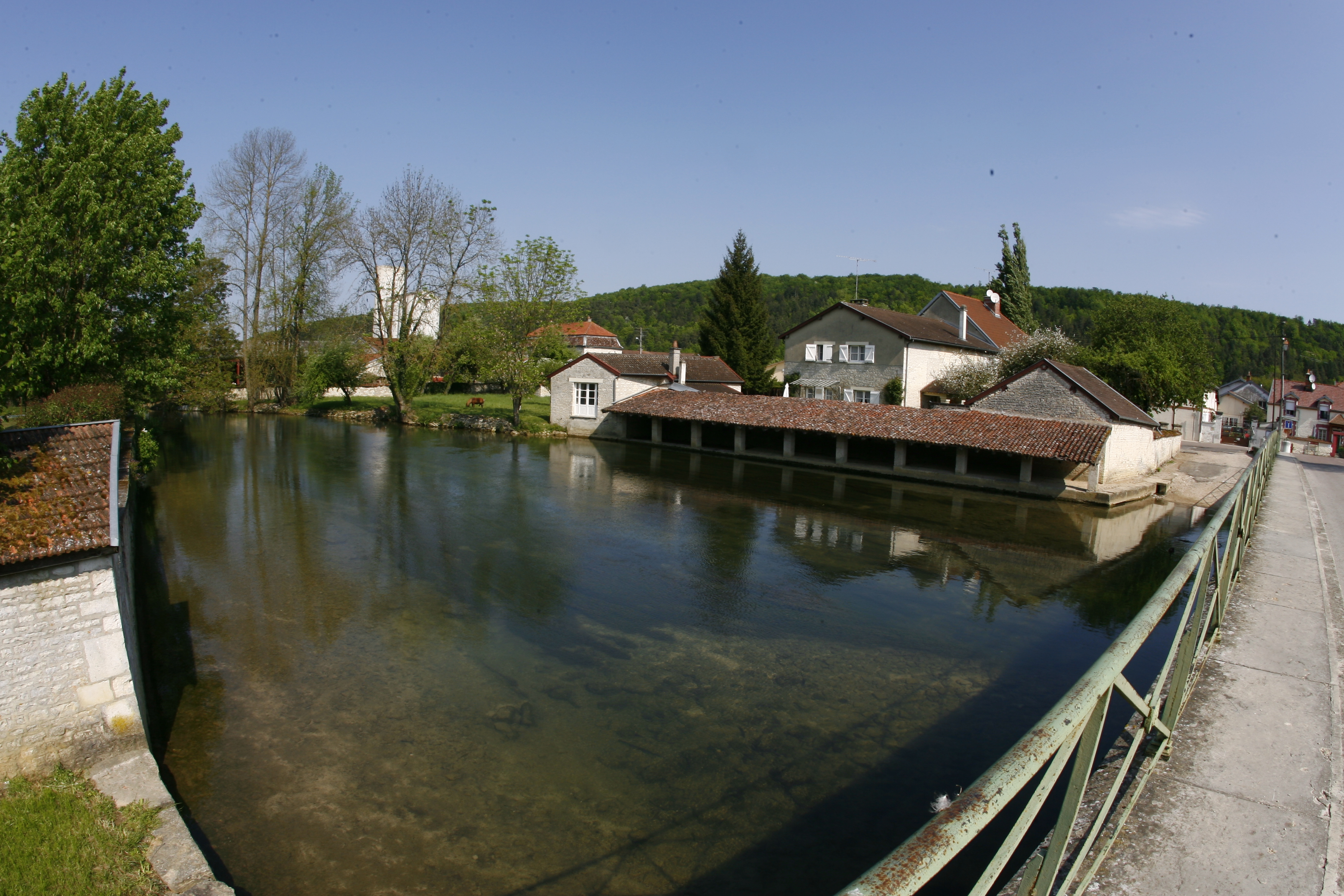
- The Aujon, with a wash house, at Longchamp-sur-Aujon.

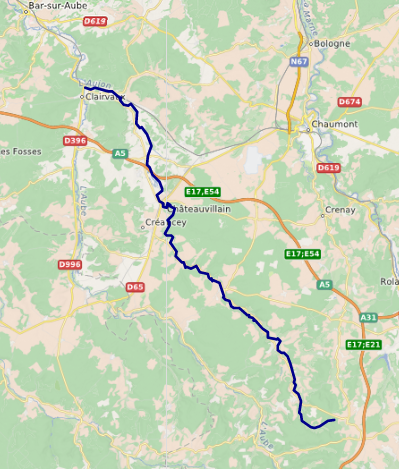

Location
- Country: France

Physical characteristics
- Source
  - location: Perrogney-les-Fontaines
  - coordinates: 47°48′50″N 05°10′46″E
  - elevation: 430 m (1,410 ft)
- Mouth
  - location: Aube
  - coordinates: 48°09′20″N 04°47′50″E
  - elevation: 185 m (607 ft)
- Length: 68 km (42 mi)
- Basin size: 480 km^{2} (190 sq mi)
- Discharge
  - average: 6.45 m^{3}/s (228 cu ft/s)

Basin features
- Progression: Aube→ Seine→ English Channel

The Aujon (French pronunciation: [oʒɔ̃]) is a 68 km (42 mi) long river in the Haute-Marne and Aube departments in northeastern France. Its source is at Perrogney-les-Fontaines. It flows generally northwest. It is a right tributary of the Aube into which it flows at Longchamp-sur-Aujon.

== Departments and communes along its course ==
This list is ordered from source to mouth:

- Haute-Marne: Perrogney-les-Fontaines, Auberive, Rochetaillée, Vauxbons, Saint-Loup-sur-Aujon, Giey-sur-Aujon, Arc-en-Barrois, Cour-l'Évêque, Coupray, Châteauvillain, Pont-la-Ville, Orges, Cirfontaines-en-Azois, Aizanville, Maranville, Rennepont,
- Aube: Longchamp-sur-Aujon,
