= Dancevoir =

- Commune
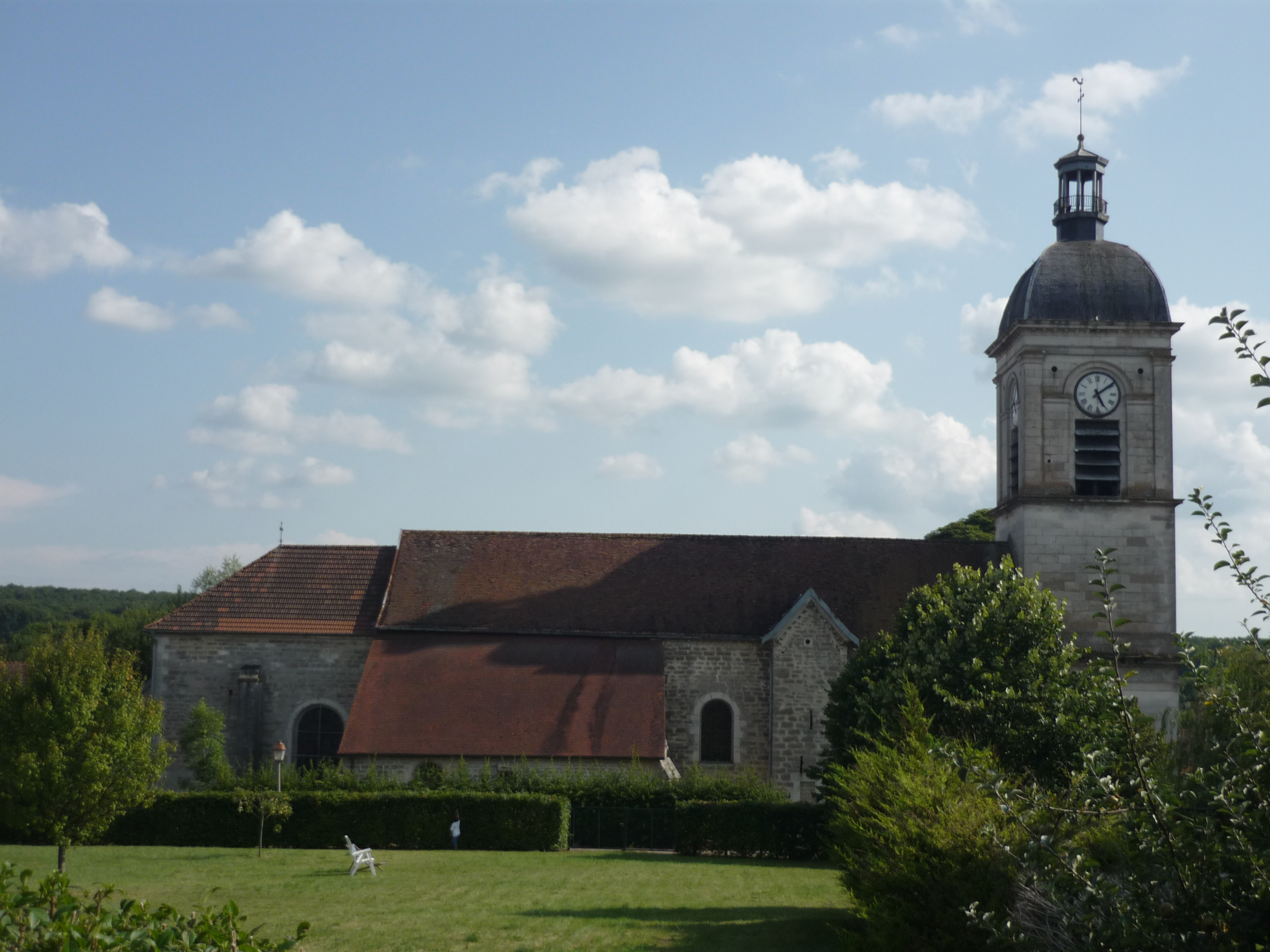
- The church in Dancevoir
- Location of Dancevoir
- Location within France Location within Grand Est
- Coordinates: 47°55′41″N 4°52′32″E
- Country: France
- Region: Grand Est
- Department: Haute-Marne
- Arrondissement: Chaumont
- Canton: Châteauvillain
- Intercommunality: CC des Trois Forêts

Government
  - Mayor (2020–2026): Josette Demangeot
- Area^{1}: 25.58 km^{2} (9.88 sq mi)
- Elevation: 370 m (1,210 ft)
- Population (2023): 198
  - Density: 7.74/km^{2} (20.0/sq mi)
- Time zone: UTC+01:00 (CET)
  - Summer (DST): UTC+02:00 (CEST)
- INSEE/Postal code: 52165 /52210
- ^{1} French Land Register data, which excludes lakes, ponds, glaciers > 1 km^{2} (0.386 sq mi or 247 acres) and river estuaries.

Dancevoir (French pronunciation: [dɑ̃səvwaʁ]) is a commune in the Haute-Marne department in north-eastern France.

== History ==
Dancevoir is named in Le Conscrit des cent villages, a poem of Louis Aragon, written as an act of intellectual Resistance clandestinely in spring 1943, during the Second World War.

The maternal grandmother of American scientist Bill Nye originated from the commune. Illustrator Danièle Bour currently resides in Dancevoir with her husband.

== Demographics ==
Historical population
Year	Pop.	±% p.a.
1968	275	—
1975	240	−1.93%
1982	226	−0.85%
1990	238	+0.65%
1999	234	−0.19%
2007	246	+0.63%
2012	227	−1.59%
2017	189	−3.60%
2023	198	+0.78%
Source: INSEE

== See also ==
- Communes of the Haute-Marne department
