= Silvarouvres =

- Commune
- Location of Silvarouvres
- Location within France Location within Grand Est
- Coordinates: 48°03′41″N 4°47′11″E
- Country: France
- Region: Grand Est
- Department: Haute-Marne
- Arrondissement: Chaumont
- Canton: Châteauvillain
- Intercommunality: Trois Forêts

Government
  - Mayor (2022–2026): Fabrice Rigaut
- Area^{1}: 19.41 km^{2} (7.49 sq mi)
- Elevation: 225 m (738 ft)
- Population (2023): 32
  - Density: 1.6/km^{2} (4.3/sq mi)
- Time zone: UTC+01:00 (CET)
  - Summer (DST): UTC+02:00 (CEST)
- INSEE/Postal code: 52474 /52120
- ^{1} French Land Register data, which excludes lakes, ponds, glaciers > 1 km^{2} (0.386 sq mi or 247 acres) and river estuaries.

Silvarouvres (French pronunciation: [silvaʁuvʁ]) is a commune in the Haute-Marne department in north-eastern France.

== See also ==
- Communes of the Haute-Marne department
