= Montheries =

- Commune
- Location of Montheries
- Location within France Location within Grand Est
- Coordinates: 48°10′08″N 4°54′36″E
- Country: France
- Region: Grand Est
- Department: Haute-Marne
- Arrondissement: Chaumont
- Canton: Châteauvillain
- Intercommunality: Trois Forêts

Government
  - Mayor (2020–2026): Martine Henrissat
- Area^{1}: 16.22 km^{2} (6.26 sq mi)
- Elevation: 237 m (778 ft)
- Population (2023): 76
  - Density: 4.7/km^{2} (12/sq mi)
- Time zone: UTC+01:00 (CET)
  - Summer (DST): UTC+02:00 (CEST)
- INSEE/Postal code: 52330 /52330
- ^{1} French Land Register data, which excludes lakes, ponds, glaciers > 1 km^{2} (0.386 sq mi or 247 acres) and river estuaries.

Montheries (French pronunciation: [mɔ̃tʁi]) is a commune in the Haute-Marne department in north-eastern France.

== See also ==
- Communes of the Haute-Marne department
