= Musumecia =

Scientific classification
- Kingdom: Fungi
- Division: Basidiomycota
- Class: Agaricomycetes
- Order: Agaricales
- Family: Pseudoclitocybaceae
- Genus: Musumecia; Vizzini & Contu (2011)

Type species
- Musumecia bettlachensis Vizzini & Contu (2011)

Species
- Musumecia alpina Musumecia sardoa Musumecia vermicularis

Genus of fungi

Musumecia is a genus of fungi in the order Agaricales. Basidiocarps (fruit bodies) are agaricoid and resemble those of Clitocybe species. The genus is currently known from Europe and China.

== Etymology ==
Musumecia was named after Swiss mycologist Enzo Musumeci.
