= Joseph Darlington =

Jesuit priest and academic (1850–1939)

Fr. Joseph Darlington SJ (1850–1939), was an English-born Jesuit Priest, who served as dean of studies and professor of English in University College Dublin, at the time a Jesuit College. James Joyce was one of his pupils at UCD, and Joyce based the character Fr Butt SJ in A Portrait of the Artist as a Young Man on him. Darlington was also dean of the Medical School in Cecilia Street, from 1902.

The second son of Ralph Darlington of Wigan, he matriculated at Brasenose College, Oxford in 1869, graduating B.A. in 1874, and M.A. in 1876. He was ordained as an Anglican priest; he later converted to Catholicism, becoming a Jesuit.

Darlington contributed to the St. Stephens magazine in UCD. In 1895 he was first editor of The Sheaf magazine for the St Joseph's Young Priests Society.
