= Autreville-sur-la-Renne =

- Commune
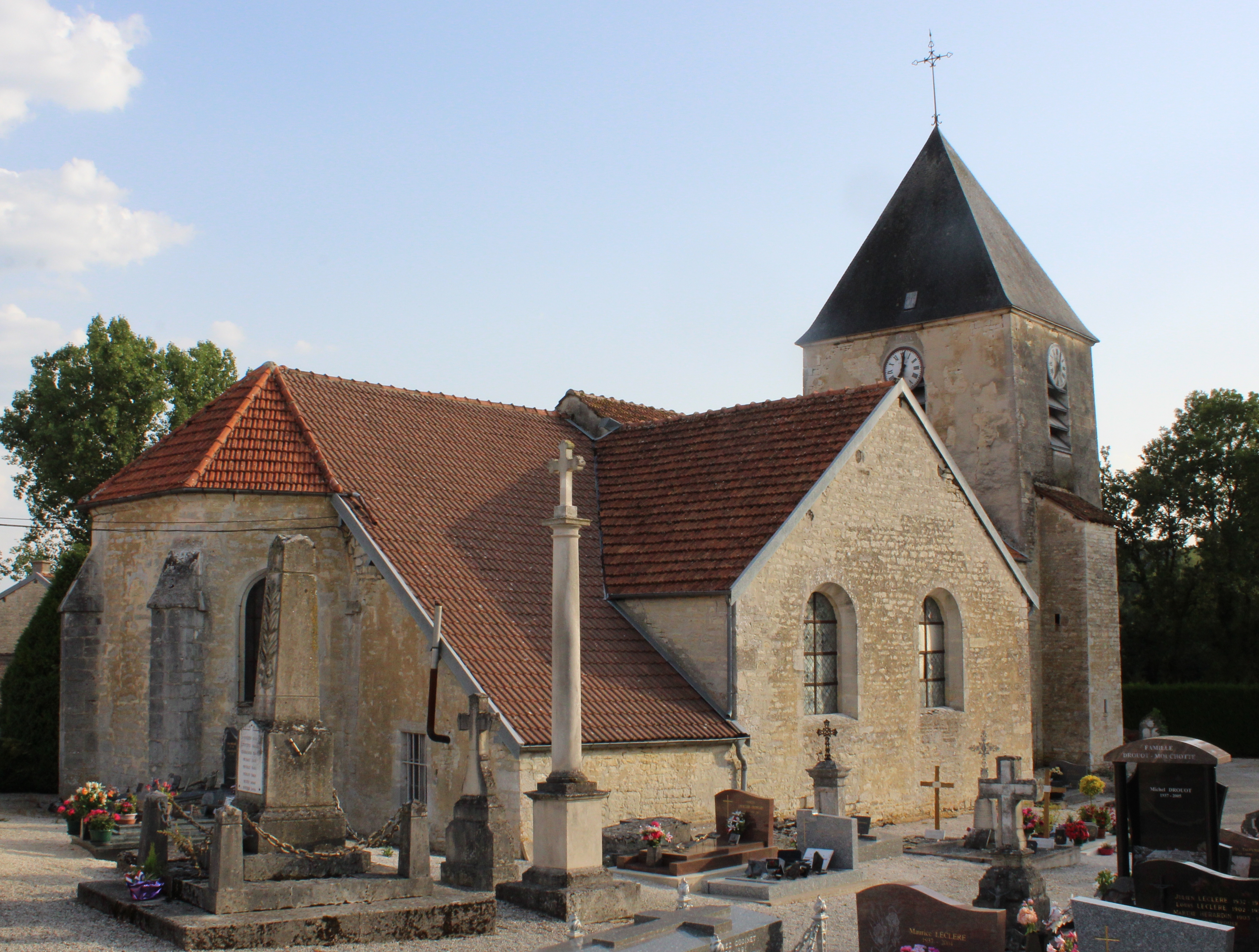
- The church in Autreville-sur-la-Renne

- Coat of arms
- Location of Autreville-sur-la-Renne
- Location within France Location within Grand Est
- Coordinates: 48°07′05″N 4°58′47″E
- Country: France
- Region: Grand Est
- Department: Haute-Marne
- Arrondissement: Chaumont
- Canton: Châteauvillain
- Intercommunality: CC Trois Forêts

Government
  - Mayor (2024–2026): Françoise Guillaumot
- Area^{1}: 41.76 km^{2} (16.12 sq mi)
- Population (2023): 386
  - Density: 9.24/km^{2} (23.9/sq mi)
- Time zone: UTC+01:00 (CET)
  - Summer (DST): UTC+02:00 (CEST)
- INSEE/Postal code: 52031 /52120
- ^{1} French Land Register data, which excludes lakes, ponds, glaciers > 1 km^{2} (0.386 sq mi or 247 acres) and river estuaries.

Autreville-sur-la-Renne (French pronunciation: [otʁəvil syʁ la ʁɛn]) is a commune in the Haute-Marne department in the Grand Est region in northeastern France. Between 1972 and 2012 the commune Lavilleneuve-au-Roi was part of Autreville-sur-la-Renne.

== Population ==
Historical population
Year	Pop.	±% p.a.
1968	364	—
1975	348	−0.64%
1982	395	+1.83%
1990	416	+0.65%
1999	388	−0.77%
2007	395	+0.22%
2012	393	−0.10%
2017	382	−0.57%
2023	386	+0.17%
Source: INSEE

Population data refer to the area corresponding with the commune as of January 2025.

== See also ==
- Communes of the Haute-Marne department
