= Latrecey-Ormoy-sur-Aube =

- Commune
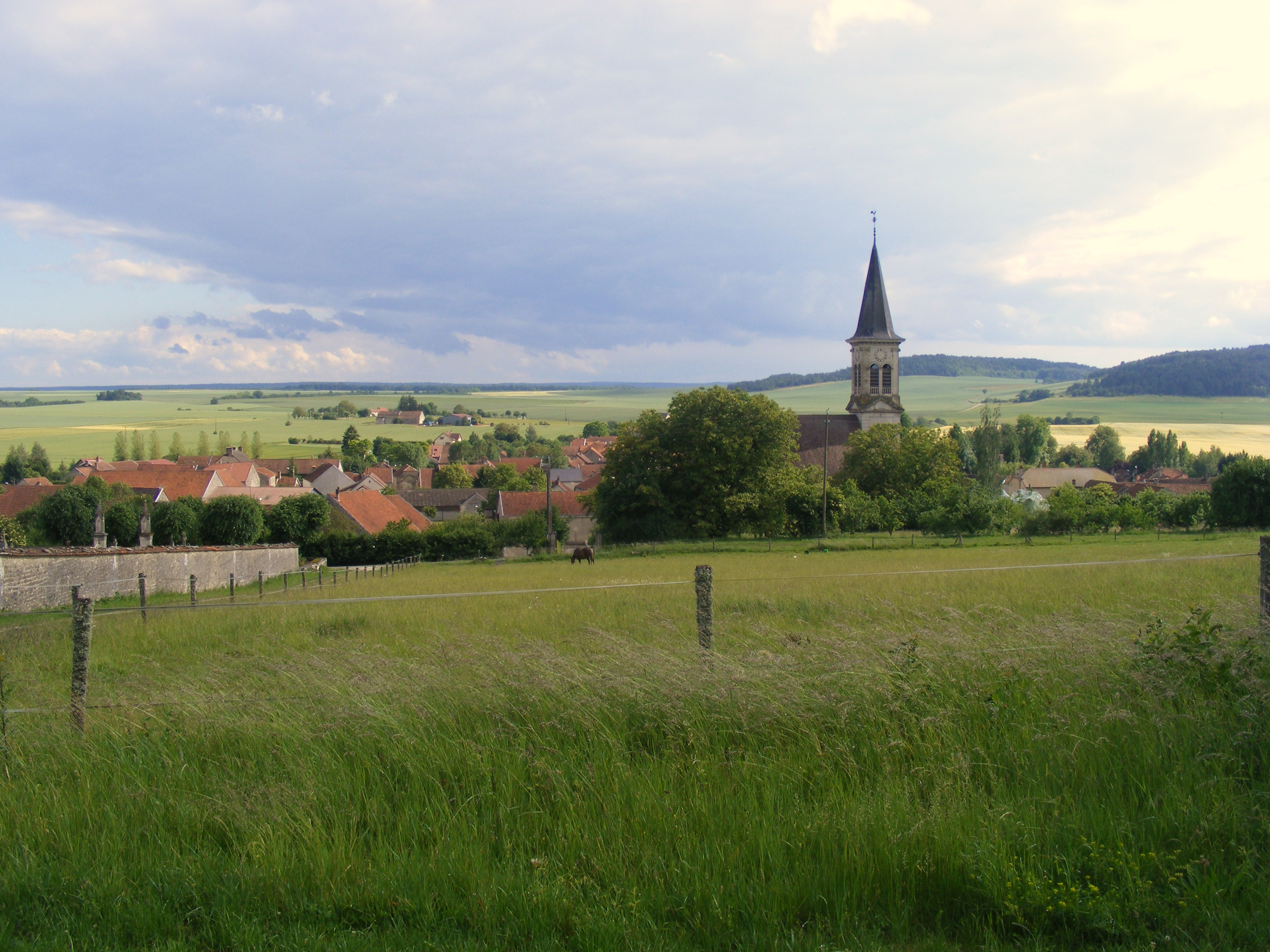
- A general view of Latrecey-Ormoy-sur-Aube
- Location of Latrecey-Ormoy-sur-Aube
- Location within France Location within Grand Est
- Coordinates: 47°59′02″N 4°51′28″E
- Country: France
- Region: Grand Est
- Department: Haute-Marne
- Arrondissement: Chaumont
- Canton: Châteauvillain
- Intercommunality: CC des Trois Forêts

Government
  - Mayor (2020–2026): Philippe Cordier
- Area^{1}: 46.27 km^{2} (17.86 sq mi)
- Elevation: 250 m (820 ft)
- Population (2023): 268
  - Density: 5.79/km^{2} (15.0/sq mi)
- Time zone: UTC+01:00 (CET)
  - Summer (DST): UTC+02:00 (CEST)
- INSEE/Postal code: 52274 /52120
- ^{1} French Land Register data, which excludes lakes, ponds, glaciers > 1 km^{2} (0.386 sq mi or 247 acres) and river estuaries.

Latrecey-Ormoy-sur-Aube (French pronunciation: [latʁəsɛ ɔʁmwa syʁ ob]) is a commune in the Haute-Marne department in north-eastern France.

== See also ==
- Communes of the Haute-Marne department
