= Châteauvillain =

- Commune
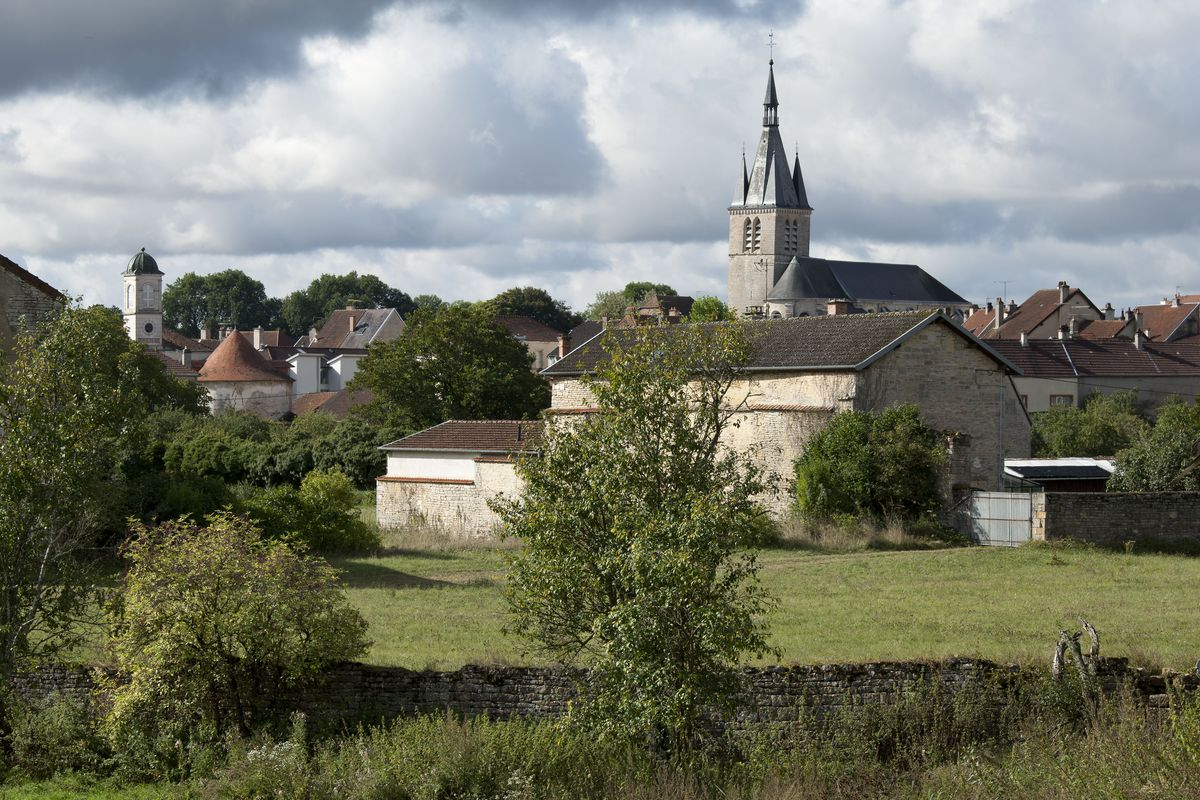
- A general view of Châteauvillain

- Coat of arms
- Location of Châteauvillain
- Location within France Location within Grand Est
- Coordinates: 48°02′06″N 4°54′55″E
- Country: France
- Region: Grand Est
- Department: Haute-Marne
- Arrondissement: Chaumont
- Canton: Châteauvillain
- Intercommunality: CC des Trois Forêts

Government
  - Mayor (2020–2026): Marie-Claude Lavocat
- Area^{1}: 106.37 km^{2} (41.07 sq mi)
- Elevation: 235 m (771 ft)
- Population (2023): 1,482
  - Density: 13.93/km^{2} (36.09/sq mi)
- Time zone: UTC+01:00 (CET)
  - Summer (DST): UTC+02:00 (CEST)
- INSEE/Postal code: 52114 /52120
- ^{1} French Land Register data, which excludes lakes, ponds, glaciers > 1 km^{2} (0.386 sq mi or 247 acres) and river estuaries.

Coat of arms

Châteauvillain (French pronunciation: [ʃɑtovilɛ̃]) is a commune in the Haute-Marne department in north-eastern France.

== Geography ==
The Aujon flows north-northwestward through the western part of the commune and crosses the village.

== See also ==
- Communes of the Haute-Marne department
