= Vauxbons =

- Commune
- Location of Vauxbons
- Location within France Location within Grand Est
- Coordinates: 47°53′02″N 5°09′23″E
- Country: France
- Region: Grand Est
- Department: Haute-Marne
- Arrondissement: Langres
- Canton: Villegusien-le-Lac
- Intercommunality: Auberive Vingeanne et Montsaugeonnais

Government
  - Mayor (2020–2026): Edmond Rocoplan
- Area^{1}: 12.48 km^{2} (4.82 sq mi)
- Elevation: 366 m (1,201 ft)
- Highest elevation: 461 m (1,512 ft)
- Lowest elevation: 319 m (1,047 ft)
- Population (2023): 55
  - Density: 4.4/km^{2} (11/sq mi)
- Time zone: UTC+01:00 (CET)
  - Summer (DST): UTC+02:00 (CEST)
- INSEE/Postal code: 52507 /52200
- ^{1} French Land Register data, which excludes lakes, ponds, glaciers > 1 km^{2} (0.386 sq mi or 247 acres) and river estuaries.

Vauxbons (French pronunciation: [vobɔ̃]) is a commune in the Haute-Marne department in north-eastern France.

== Geography ==
The Aujon forms part of the commune's south-western border.

== See also ==
- Communes of the Haute-Marne department
