= Lanty-sur-Aube =

- Commune
- Coat of arms
- Location of Lanty-sur-Aube
- Location within France Location within Grand Est
- Coordinates: 48°01′29″N 4°46′16″E
- Country: France
- Region: Grand Est
- Department: Haute-Marne
- Arrondissement: Chaumont
- Canton: Châteauvillain
- Intercommunality: CC des Trois Forêts

Government
  - Mayor (2020–2026): Thierry Gourlin
- Area^{1}: 22.42 km^{2} (8.66 sq mi)
- Elevation: 232 m (761 ft)
- Population (2023): 114
  - Density: 5.08/km^{2} (13.2/sq mi)
- Time zone: UTC+01:00 (CET)
  - Summer (DST): UTC+02:00 (CEST)
- INSEE/Postal code: 52272 /52120
- ^{1} French Land Register data, which excludes lakes, ponds, glaciers > 1 km^{2} (0.386 sq mi or 247 acres) and river estuaries.

Lanty-sur-Aube (French pronunciation: [lɑ̃ti syʁ ob], literally Lanty on Aube) is a commune in the Haute-Marne department in north-eastern France.

== See also ==
- Communes of the Haute-Marne department
