= Blessonville =

- Commune
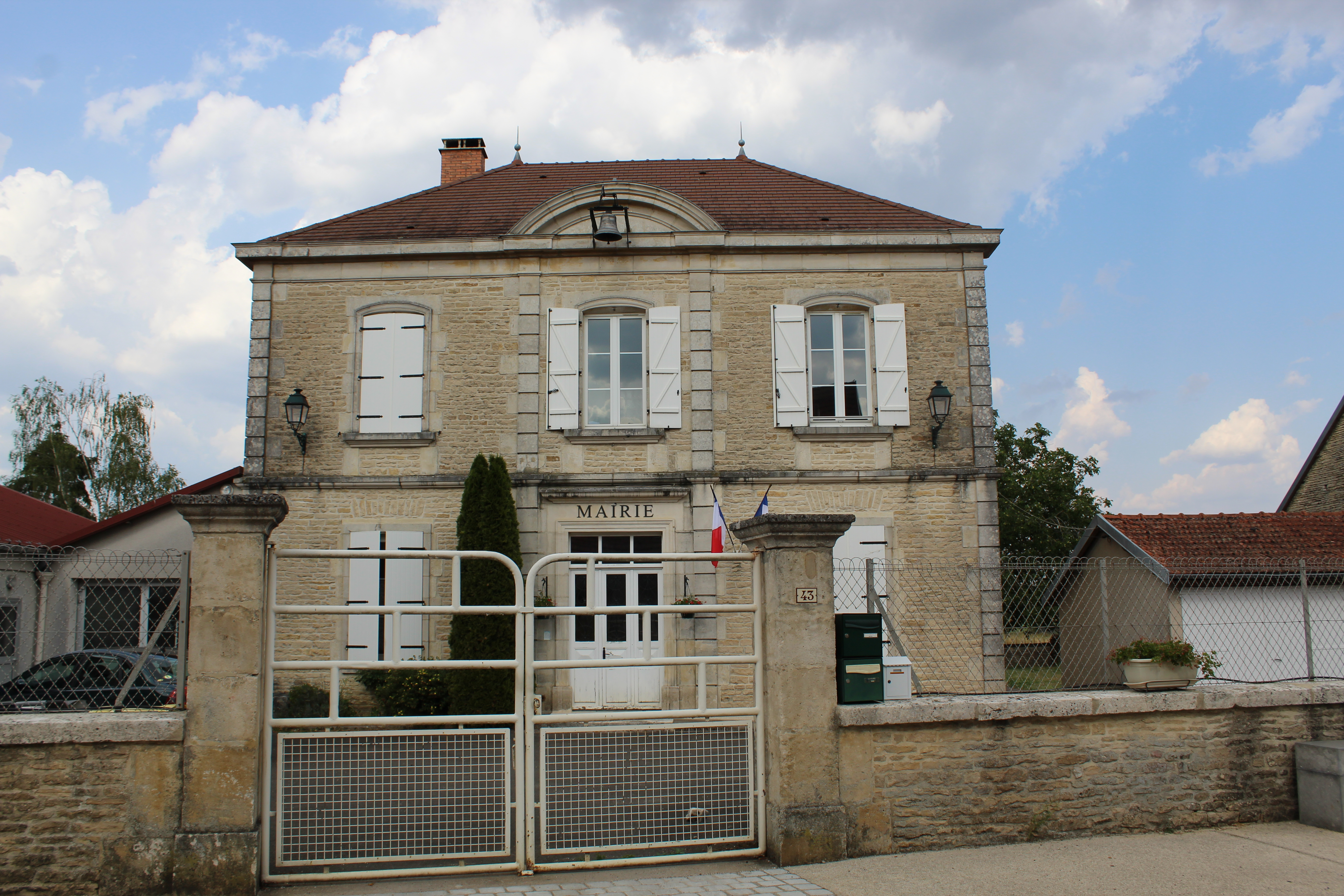
- The town hall in Blessonville

- Coat of arms
- Location of Blessonville
- Location within France Location within Grand Est
- Coordinates: 48°03′32″N 5°00′33″E
- Country: France
- Region: Grand Est
- Department: Haute-Marne
- Arrondissement: Chaumont
- Canton: Châteauvillain
- Intercommunality: Trois Forêts

Government
  - Mayor (2020–2026): Jean-Louis Bresson
- Area^{1}: 9.76 km^{2} (3.77 sq mi)
- Elevation: 307 m (1,007 ft)
- Population (2023): 174
  - Density: 17.8/km^{2} (46.2/sq mi)
- Time zone: UTC+01:00 (CET)
  - Summer (DST): UTC+02:00 (CEST)
- INSEE/Postal code: 52056 /52120
- ^{1} French Land Register data, which excludes lakes, ponds, glaciers > 1 km^{2} (0.386 sq mi or 247 acres) and river estuaries.

Blessonville (French pronunciation: [blɛsɔ̃vil]) is a commune in the Haute-Marne department in northeastern France.

== Population ==
Historical population
Year	Pop.	±% p.a.
1968	205	—
1975	168	−2.80%
1982	167	−0.09%
1990	186	+1.36%
1999	190	+0.24%
2007	223	+2.02%
2012	225	+0.18%
2017	196	−2.72%
2023	174	−1.96%
Source: INSEE

== See also ==
- Communes of the Haute-Marne department
