= Lavilleneuve-au-Roi =

- Commune
- Location of Lavilleneuve-au-Roi
- Location within France Location within Grand Est
- Coordinates: 48°09′37″N 4°55′34″E
- Country: France
- Region: Grand Est
- Department: Haute-Marne
- Arrondissement: Chaumont
- Canton: Châteauvillain

Government
  - Mayor (2020–2026): Nicolle Pensee
- Area^{1}: 10.4 km^{2} (4.0 sq mi)
- Population (2023): 69
  - Density: 6.6/km^{2} (17/sq mi)
- Time zone: UTC+01:00 (CET)
  - Summer (DST): UTC+02:00 (CEST)
- INSEE/Postal code: 52278 /52330
- ^{1} French Land Register data, which excludes lakes, ponds, glaciers > 1 km^{2} (0.386 sq mi or 247 acres) and river estuaries.

Lavilleneuve-au-Roi (French pronunciation: [lavilnœv o ʁwa]) is a commune in the Haute-Marne department in north-eastern France. Between 1972 and 2012 it was part of the commune Autreville-sur-la-Renne.

== See also ==
- Communes of the Haute-Marne department
