= Pont-la-Ville, Haute-Marne =

Pont-la-Ville
- Commune
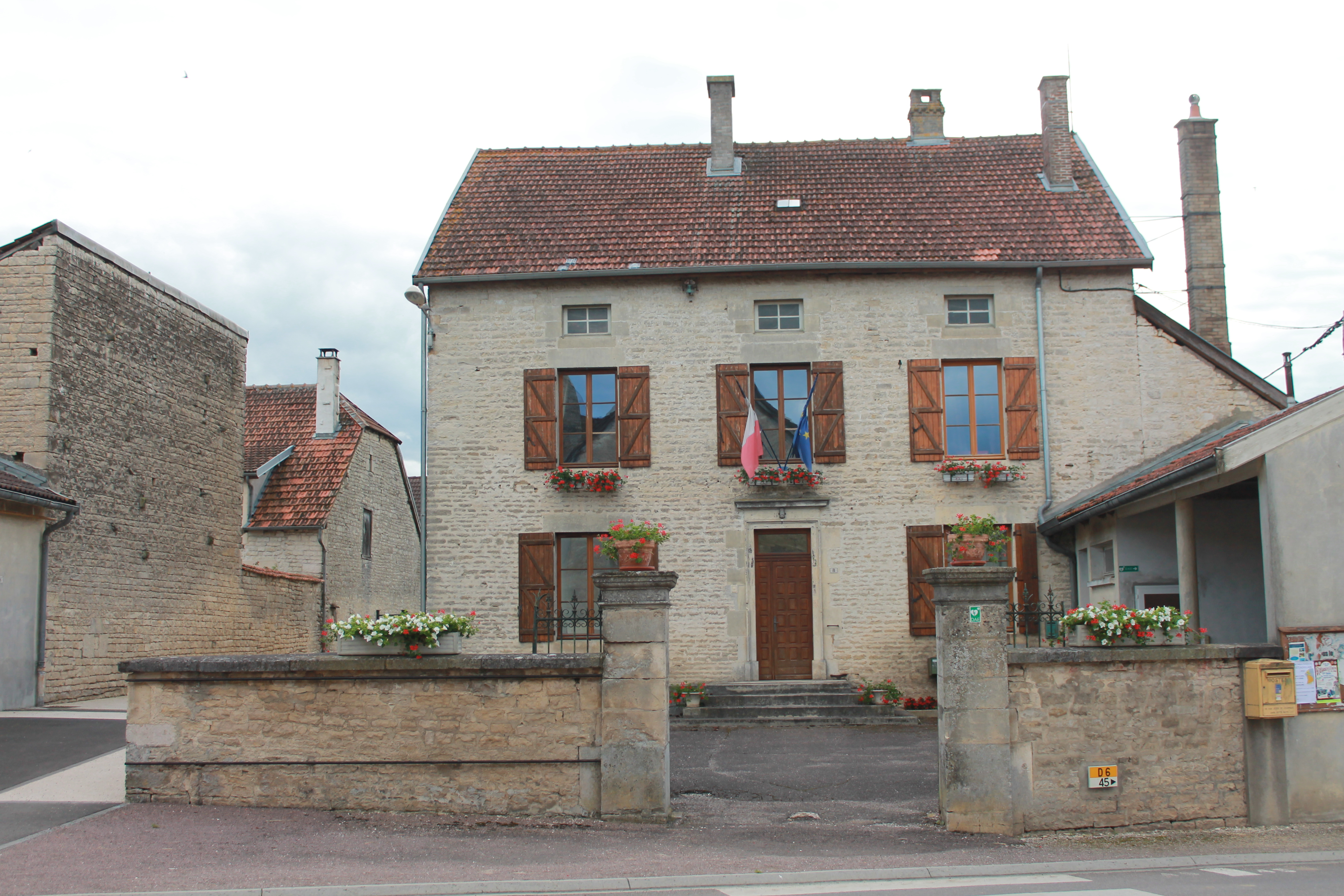
- The town hall in Pont-la-Ville
- Location of Pont-la-Ville
- Location within France Location within Grand Est
- Coordinates: 48°04′59″N 4°53′28″E
- Country: France
- Region: Grand Est
- Department: Haute-Marne
- Arrondissement: Chaumont
- Canton: Châteauvillain
- Intercommunality: CC des Trois Forêts

Government
  - Mayor (2020–2026): René Richard
- Area^{1}: 10.23 km^{2} (3.95 sq mi)
- Elevation: 219 m (719 ft)
- Population (2023): 117
  - Density: 11.4/km^{2} (29.6/sq mi)
- Time zone: UTC+01:00 (CET)
  - Summer (DST): UTC+02:00 (CEST)
- INSEE/Postal code: 52399 /52120
- ^{1} French Land Register data, which excludes lakes, ponds, glaciers > 1 km^{2} (0.386 sq mi or 247 acres) and river estuaries.

Pont-la-Ville (French pronunciation: [pɔ̃ la vil]) is a commune in the Haute-Marne department in north-eastern France.

== Geography ==
The village lies on the left bank of the Aujon, which flows northward through the eastern part of the commune.

== See also ==
- Communes of the Haute-Marne department
