= Braux-le-Châtel =

- Commune
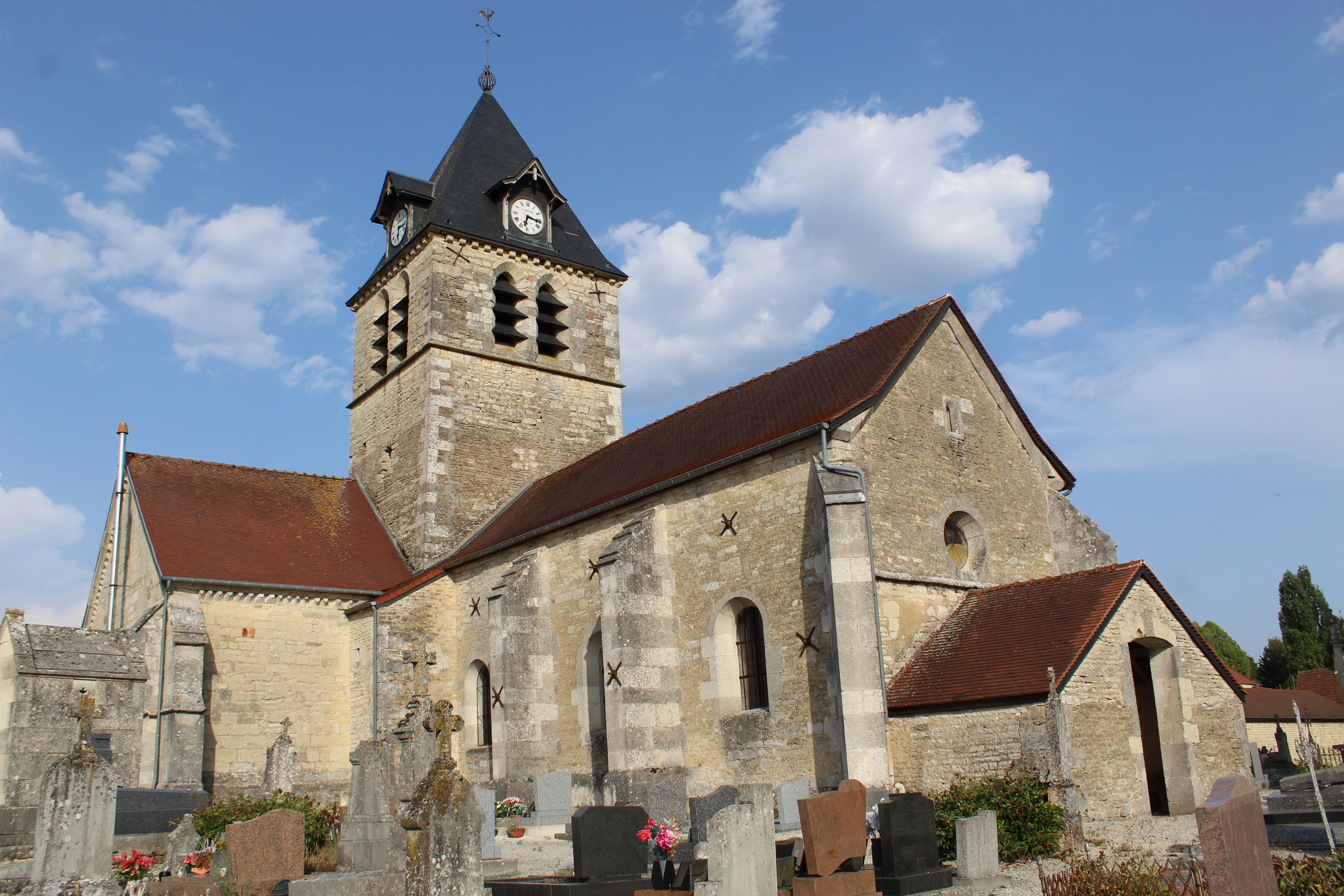
- The church in Braux-le-Châtel
- Location of Braux-le-Châtel
- Location within France Location within Grand Est
- Coordinates: 48°06′02″N 4°56′43″E
- Country: France
- Region: Grand Est
- Department: Haute-Marne
- Arrondissement: Chaumont
- Canton: Châteauvillain
- Intercommunality: Trois Forêts

Government
  - Mayor (2020–2026): Charles Gullaud
- Area^{1}: 10.62 km^{2} (4.10 sq mi)
- Elevation: 241 m (791 ft)
- Population (2023): 123
  - Density: 11.6/km^{2} (30.0/sq mi)
- Time zone: UTC+01:00 (CET)
  - Summer (DST): UTC+02:00 (CEST)
- INSEE/Postal code: 52069 /52120
- ^{1} French Land Register data, which excludes lakes, ponds, glaciers > 1 km^{2} (0.386 sq mi or 247 acres) and river estuaries.

Braux-le-Châtel (French pronunciation: [bʁo lə ʃɑtɛl]) is a commune in the Haute-Marne department in northeastern France.

== Population ==
Historical population
Year	Pop.	±% p.a.
1968	161	—
1975	163	+0.18%
1982	132	−2.97%
1990	121	−1.08%
1999	129	+0.71%
2007	141	+1.12%
2012	140	−0.14%
2017	145	+0.70%
2023	123	−2.71%
Source: INSEE

== See also ==
- Communes of the Haute-Marne department
