= Braux, Côte-d'Or =

Braux
- Commune
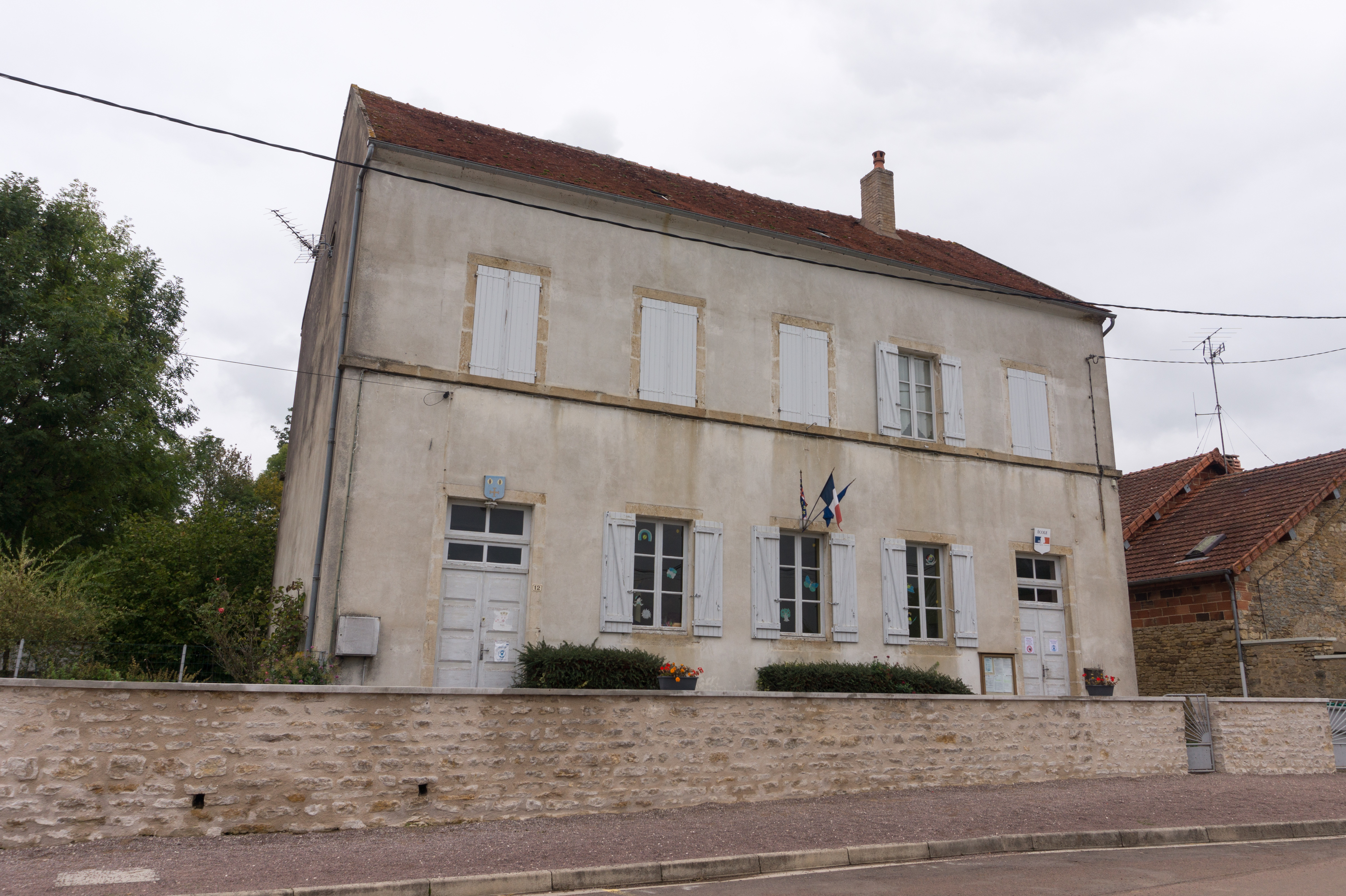
- Town hall

- Coat of arms
- Location of Braux
- Location within France Location within Bourgogne-Franche-Comté
- Coordinates: 47°24′36″N 4°25′31″E
- Country: France
- Region: Bourgogne-Franche-Comté
- Department: Côte-d'Or
- Arrondissement: Montbard
- Canton: Semur-en-Auxois

Government
  - Mayor (2020–2026): Ludivine Bizot
- Area^{1}: 12.84 km^{2} (4.96 sq mi)
- Elevation: 350 m (1,150 ft)
- Highest elevation: 488 m (1,601 ft)
- Lowest elevation: 308 m (1,010 ft)
- Population (2023): 180
  - Density: 14/km^{2} (36/sq mi)
- Time zone: UTC+01:00 (CET)
  - Summer (DST): UTC+02:00 (CEST)
- INSEE/Postal code: 21101 /21390
- ^{1} French Land Register data, which excludes lakes, ponds, glaciers > 1 km^{2} (0.386 sq mi or 247 acres) and river estuaries.

Braux (French pronunciation: [bʁo]) is a commune in the Côte-d'Or department in eastern France.

== Population ==
Historical population
Year	Pop.	±% p.a.
1968	170	—
1975	156	−1.22%
1982	140	−1.53%
1990	146	+0.53%
1999	167	+1.50%
2007	183	+1.15%
2012	162	−2.41%
2017	168	+0.73%
2023	180	+1.16%
Source: INSEE

== See also ==
- Communes of the Côte-d'Or department
