= Dinteville, Haute-Marne =

Dinteville
- Commune
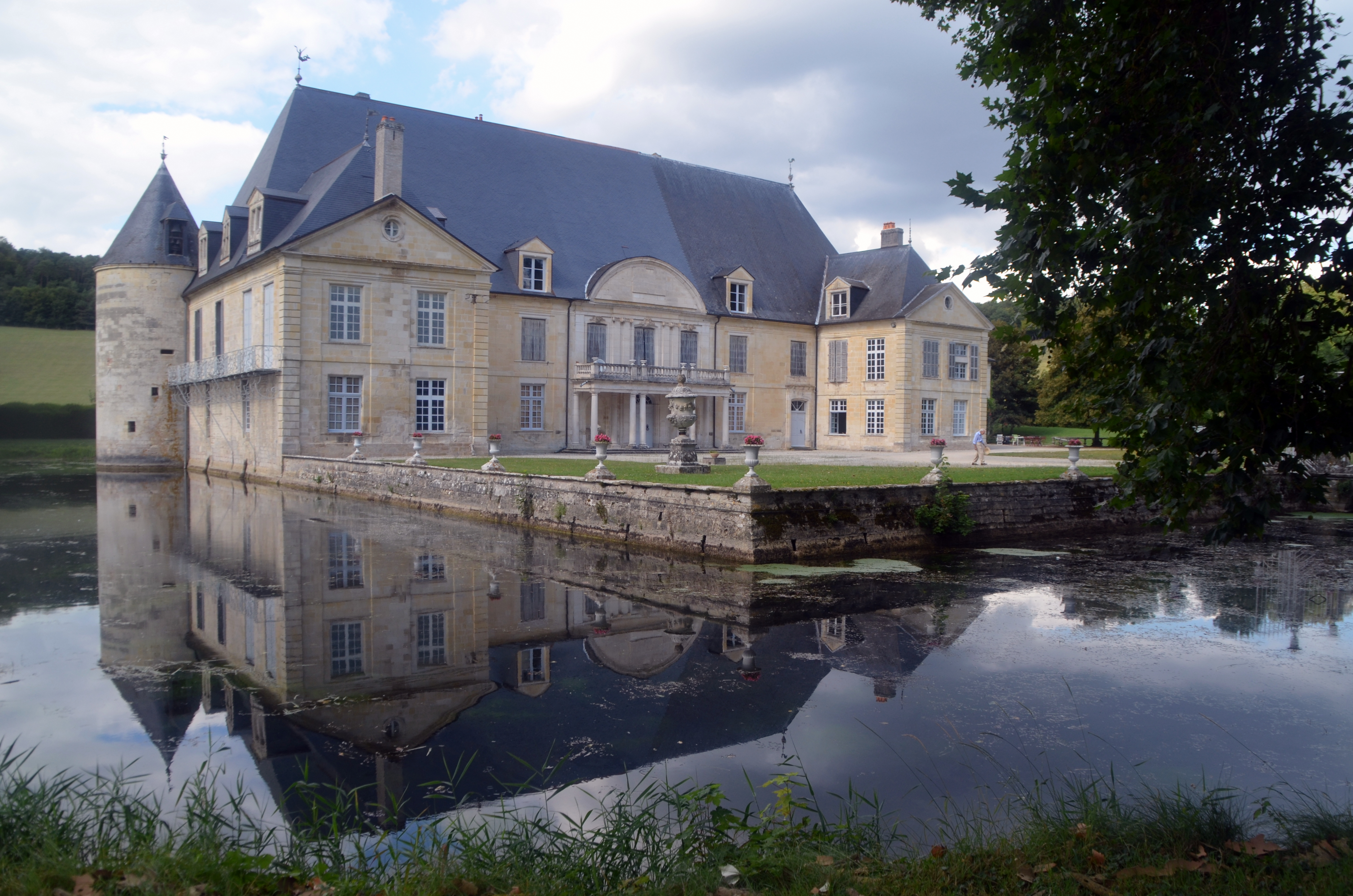
- The chateau in Dinteville

- Coat of arms
- Location of Dinteville
- Location within France Location within Grand Est
- Coordinates: 48°01′58″N 4°47′49″E
- Country: France
- Region: Grand Est
- Department: Haute-Marne
- Arrondissement: Chaumont
- Canton: Châteauvillain
- Intercommunality: CC des Trois Forêts

Government
  - Mayor (2020–2026): Patrick Casuso
- Area^{1}: 15.46 km^{2} (5.97 sq mi)
- Elevation: 218 m (715 ft)
- Population (2023): 62
  - Density: 4.0/km^{2} (10/sq mi)
- Time zone: UTC+01:00 (CET)
  - Summer (DST): UTC+02:00 (CEST)
- INSEE/Postal code: 52168 /52120
- ^{1} French Land Register data, which excludes lakes, ponds, glaciers > 1 km^{2} (0.386 sq mi or 247 acres) and river estuaries.

Dinteville (French pronunciation: [dɛ̃tvil]) is a commune in the Haute-Marne department in north-eastern France.

The Chateau de Dinteville used to be a residence of the Marquesses of Rougé.

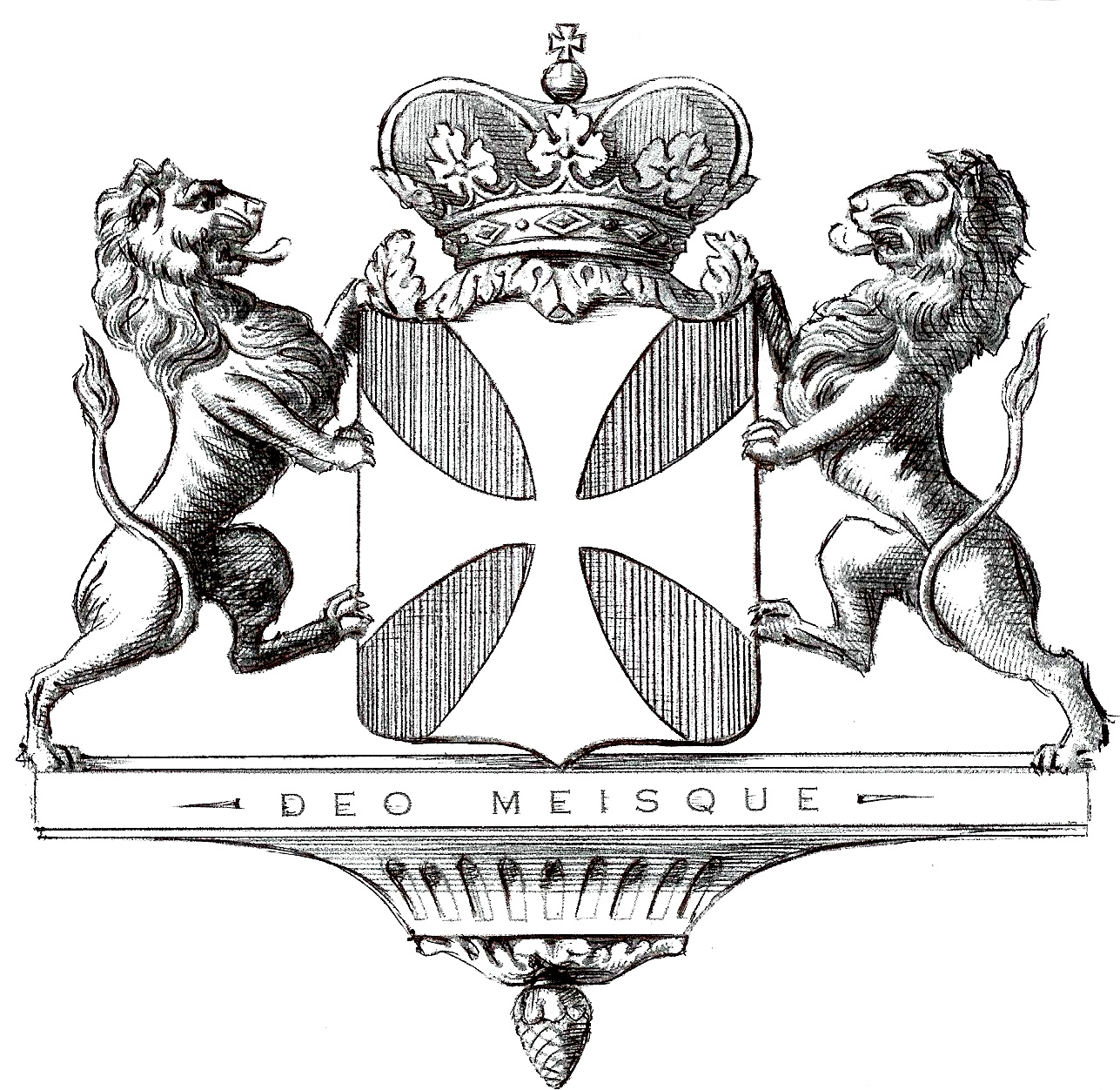
Coat of Arms of the House Rougé

== See also ==
- Communes of the Haute-Marne department
