= Jean Baptiste François Pierre Bulliard =

French physician and botanist

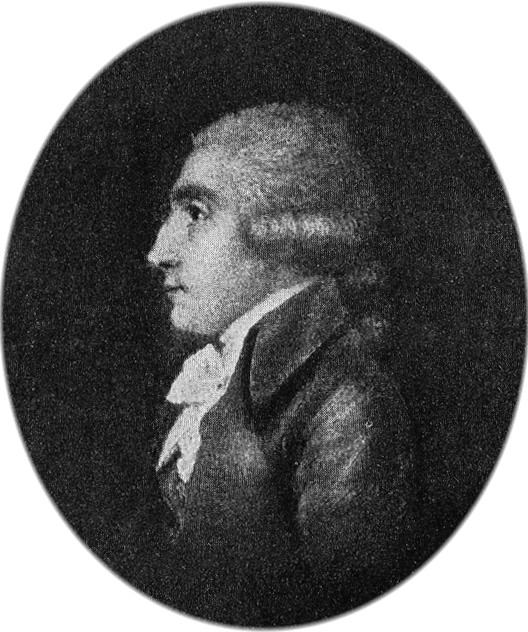
Pierre Bulliard

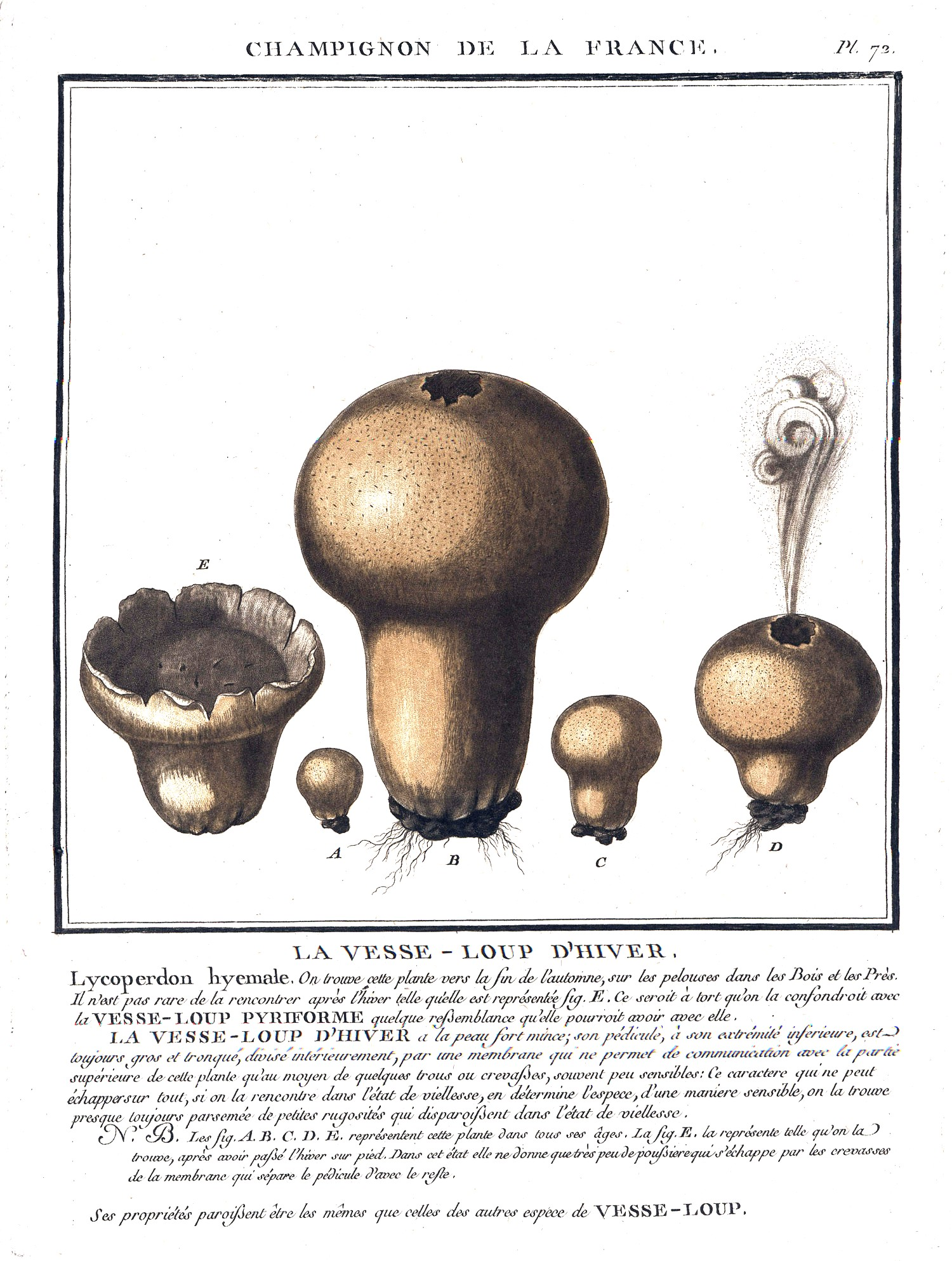
Plate 72 from Herbier de la France

Jean Baptiste François Pierre Bulliard (French pronunciation: [ʒɑ̃ batist fʁɑ̃swa pjɛʁ byljaʁ]; 24 November 1752 in Aubepierre-sur-Aube, Haute-Marne – 26 September 1793 in Paris), also known simply as Pierre Bulliard, was a French physician and botanist. The standard author abbreviation Bull. is used to indicate this person as the author when citing a botanical name.

Bulliard studied in Langres, where he became interested in natural history, and afterwards a position was obtained for him in the abbey in Clairvaux and later he moved to Paris where he study medicine. There he also practiced as a physician. He tutored the son of General Claude Dupin. He was an able draughtsman and also learnt to engrave. He invented a way of printing natural history plates in colour and used the method in his own publications.

In 1779 he commenced a work on the poisonous plants of France. It was seized by the police on the grounds that it was a dangerous work.

Bulliard's Dictionnaire Elémentaire de Botanique (1783) contributed to the spreading and consolidation of botanical terminology and the Linné system. It was especially important in the area of the mycology, containing descriptions of 393 out of 602 table mushrooms.

Significant species he described include the cep (Boletus edulis) and the common inkcap (Coprinopsis atramentaria).

== Publications ==
- 1776–1780, Flora Parisiensis (the illustrations of which he drew, engraved and coloured himself)
- 1780–93 Herbier de la France
- 1783 Dictionnaire élémentaire de botanique
- 1784 Histoire des plantes vénéneuses et suspectes de la France
- 1791–1812 Histoire des champignons de la France completed by Étienne Pierre Ventenat (1757–1808)
- 1796 Aviceptologie

== See also ==
- Category:Taxa named by Jean Baptiste François Pierre Bulliard
