= Aubepierre-sur-Aube =

- Commune
- Coat of arms
- Location of Aubepierre-sur-Aube
- Location within France Location within Grand Est
- Coordinates: 47°54′56″N 4°56′09″E
- Country: France
- Region: Grand Est
- Department: Haute-Marne
- Arrondissement: Chaumont
- Canton: Châteauvillain
- Intercommunality: CC Trois Forêts

Government
  - Mayor (2020–2026): Jean-Michel Cavin
- Area^{1}: 43.1 km^{2} (16.6 sq mi)
- Elevation: 270 m (890 ft)
- Population (2023): 180
  - Density: 4.2/km^{2} (11/sq mi)
- Time zone: UTC+01:00 (CET)
  - Summer (DST): UTC+02:00 (CEST)
- INSEE/Postal code: 52022 /52210
- ^{1} French Land Register data, which excludes lakes, ponds, glaciers > 1 km^{2} (0.386 sq mi or 247 acres) and river estuaries.

Aubepierre-sur-Aube (French pronunciation: [ob.pjɛʁ syʁ ob], literally Aubepierre on Aube) is a commune in the Haute-Marne department in the Grand Est region in northeastern France.

== Population ==
Historical population
Year	Pop.	±% p.a.
1968	296	—
1975	225	−3.84%
1982	198	−1.81%
1990	195	−0.19%
1999	215	+1.09%
2007	202	−0.78%
2012	187	−1.53%
2017	188	+0.11%
2023	180	−0.72%
Source: INSEE

== See also ==
- Communes of the Haute-Marne department
