= Richebourg, Haute-Marne =

Richebourg
- Commune
- Coat of arms
- Location of Richebourg
- Location within France Location within Grand Est
- Coordinates: 48°01′20″N 5°03′38″E
- Country: France
- Region: Grand Est
- Department: Haute-Marne
- Arrondissement: Chaumont
- Canton: Châteauvillain
- Intercommunality: CC des Trois Forêts

Government
  - Mayor (2020–2026): Patrick Devilliers
- Area^{1}: 21.2 km^{2} (8.2 sq mi)
- Elevation: 350 m (1,150 ft)
- Population (2023): 241
  - Density: 11.4/km^{2} (29.4/sq mi)
- Time zone: UTC+01:00 (CET)
  - Summer (DST): UTC+02:00 (CEST)
- INSEE/Postal code: 52422 /52120
- ^{1} French Land Register data, which excludes lakes, ponds, glaciers > 1 km^{2} (0.386 sq mi or 247 acres) and river estuaries.

Richebourg (French pronunciation: [ʁiʃbuʁ]) is a commune in the Haute-Marne department in north-eastern France.

== See also ==
- Communes of the Haute-Marne department
