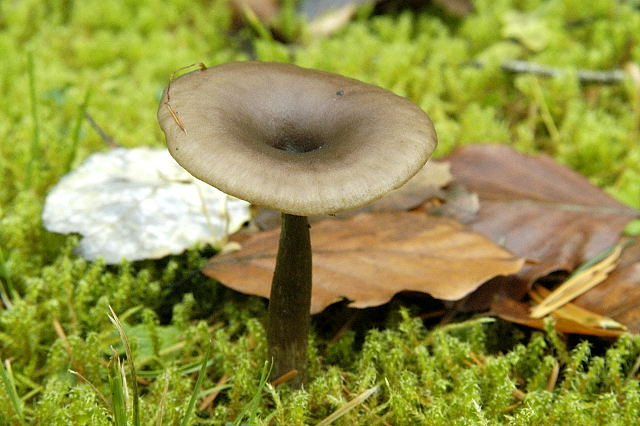
- Pseudoclitocybe cyathiformis

Scientific classification
- Kingdom: Fungi
- Division: Basidiomycota
- Class: Agaricomycetes
- Order: Agaricales
- Suborder: Tricholomatineae
- Family: Pseudoclitocybaceae; Vizzini, Consiglio, P.-A. Moreau & P. Alvarado (2018)

Type genus
- Pseudoclitocybe Singer (1956)

Genera
- Clitopaxillus; Harmajaea; Musumecia; Pogonoloma; Pseudoclitocybe

= Pseudoclitocybaceae =

Family of fungi

The Pseudoclitocybaceae are a family of fungi in the order Agaricales. It contains roughly 25 species and 5 genera.

== See also ==
- List of Agaricales families
