= Maranville =

- Commune
- Coat of arms
- Location of Maranville
- Location within France Location within Grand Est
- Coordinates: 48°08′08″N 4°52′01″E
- Country: France
- Region: Grand Est
- Department: Haute-Marne
- Arrondissement: Chaumont
- Canton: Châteauvillain

Government
  - Mayor (2020–2026): Aurélien Joly
- Area^{1}: 12.42 km^{2} (4.80 sq mi)
- Elevation: 204 m (669 ft)
- Population (2023): 405
  - Density: 32.6/km^{2} (84.5/sq mi)
- Time zone: UTC+01:00 (CET)
  - Summer (DST): UTC+02:00 (CEST)
- INSEE/Postal code: 52308 /52370
- ^{1} French Land Register data, which excludes lakes, ponds, glaciers > 1 km^{2} (0.386 sq mi or 247 acres) and river estuaries.

Maranville (French pronunciation: [maʁɑ̃vil]) is a commune in the Haute-Marne department in north-eastern France.

== Geography ==
The Aujon flows northwestward through the middle of the commune.

== See also ==
- Communes of the Haute-Marne department
