= San Biagio =

A number of towns, sites, and churches in Italy and Italian-speaking areas are named after Saint Blaise, including:

- Monte San Biagio, Italian town, province of Latina, Lazio
- San Biagio, Venice, church in Venice, Italy
- San Biagio della Cima, Italian village, province of Imperia, Liguria
- San Biagio di Callalta, Italian town, province of Treviso, Veneto
- San Biagio, Montepulciano, church near Italian town of Montepulciano, province of Siena, Tuscany
- San Biagio Platani, Italian village, province of Agrigento, Sicily
- San Biagio Saracinisco, Italian village, province of Frosinone, Lazio
- San Biagio, Maranello, church in a town of Emilia-Romagna
- Church of San Biagio a Ravecchiai, in Bellinzona, Ticino, Switzerland
- San Biagio della Pagnotta, a church in Rome
- San Biagio, Modena, a Baroque church
- San Biagio, Pollenza, a neo-classical church
- San Biagio, Lendinara, a neo-classical church in Veneto
- San Biagio, Montecatini Val di Cecina, a 14th-century church in Tuscany
- Abbazia di San Biagio di Piobbico, the ruins of an abbey in the Marche

== See also ==
- San Biagio island, Lake Garda
- Sacca San Biagio, island in the Venetian Lagoon
