= Vallesa de la Guareña =

Vallesa de La Guareña
- Municipality
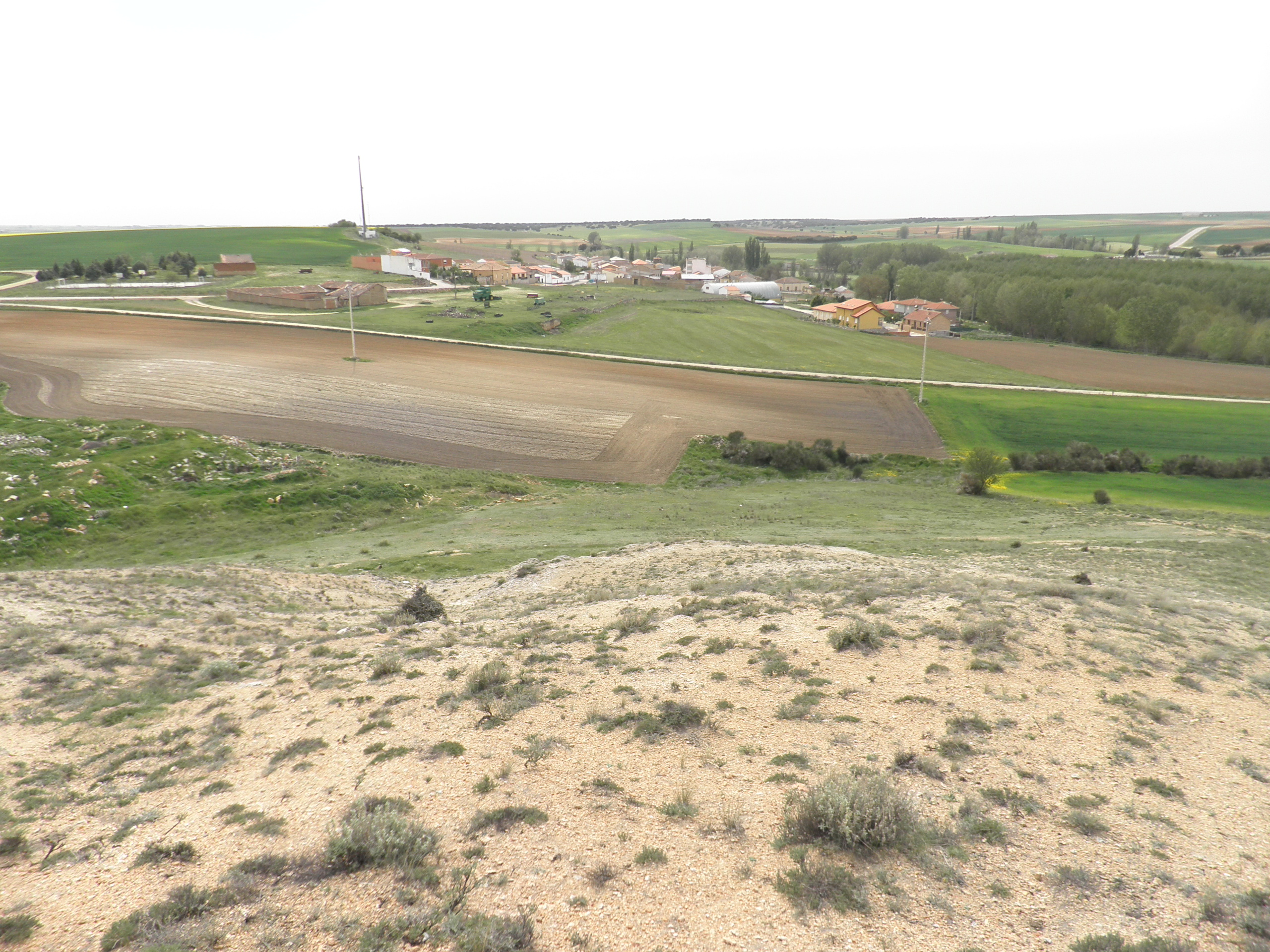
- Panoramic view over La Gavia hill.

- Location in Spain
- Coordinates: 41°08′07″N 5°19′36″W
- Country: Spain
- Autonomous community: Castile and León
- Province: Zamora
- Comarca: La Guareña
- Judicial district: Toro
- Municipality: Vallesa de La Guareña

Government
  - Mayor: Teodora Puente García (PP)

Area
  - Total: 28.07 km^{2} (10.84 sq mi)
- Elevation: 764 m (2,507 ft)

Population (2025-01-01)
  - Total: 67
  - Density: 2.4/km^{2} (6.2/sq mi)
- Demonym(s): Vallesano, na
- Time zone: UTC+1 (CET)
  - Summer (DST): UTC+2 (CEST)
- Postal code: 49450
- Dialing code: 980
- Official language(s): Spanish
- Climate: BSk
- Patron saint: Saint Blaise of Sebastea
- Website: www.vallesadelaguarena.es

Vallesa de la Guareña is a municipality located in the province of Zamora, Castile and León, Spain. According to the 2015 census (INE), the municipality has a population of 106 inhabitants.

== History ==
Cross of the medieval Order of Knights Hospitaller

== Transportation ==
CL-605

ZA-L-2110

== Main sights ==
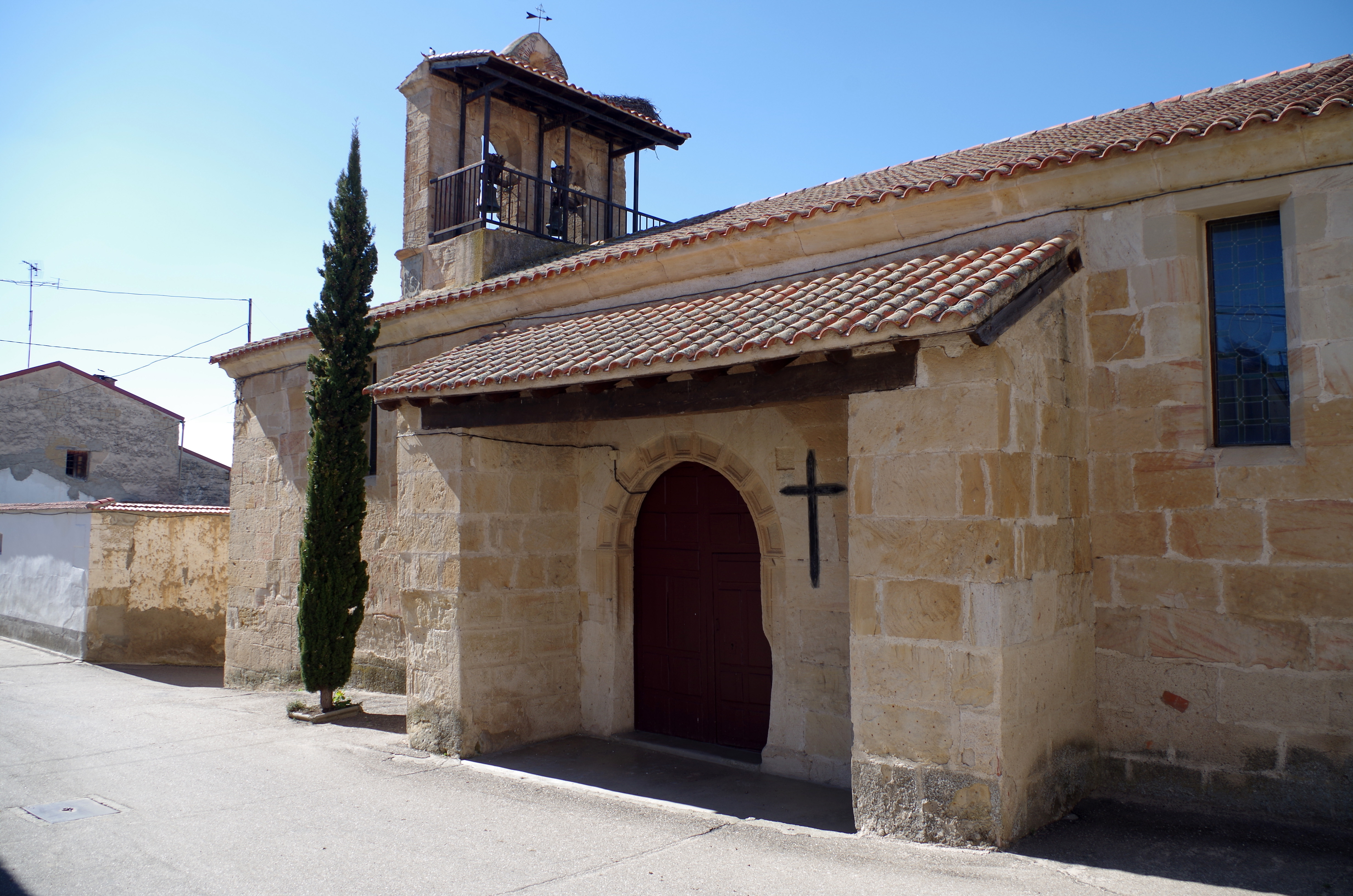
Church of San Juan Bautista

- The Church of San Juan Bautista.
- The Mudéjar Church of San Andrés in Olmo de La Guareña from the 13th century, recently protected as B.I.C.
