= São Brás =

São Brás or São Braz (Portuguese for Saint Blaise) may refer to:

== In Brazil ==
- São Brás, Alagoas, in Alagoas
- São Brás do Suaçuí, in Minas Gerais
- São Braz, Belém, a neighbourhood of Belém, Brazil
- São Braz do Piauí, in Piauí

== In Portugal ==
- São Brás de Alportel, a municipality in the Faro District
- São Brás (Amadora), a parish in the municipality of Amadora

=== In the Azores ===
- São Brás (Praia da Vitória), a civil parish in the municipality of Praia da Vitória
- São Brás (Ribeira Grande), a civil parish in the municipality of Ribeira Grande

== In India ==
- São Brás, historical sub-urb of the City of Goa, Goa, India
- Sao Braz, a former Croatian colony in Gandaulim, Goa, India
