= São Brás, Alagoas =

Municipality of Alagoas, Brazil

São Brás
- Municipality of Alagoas, Brazil
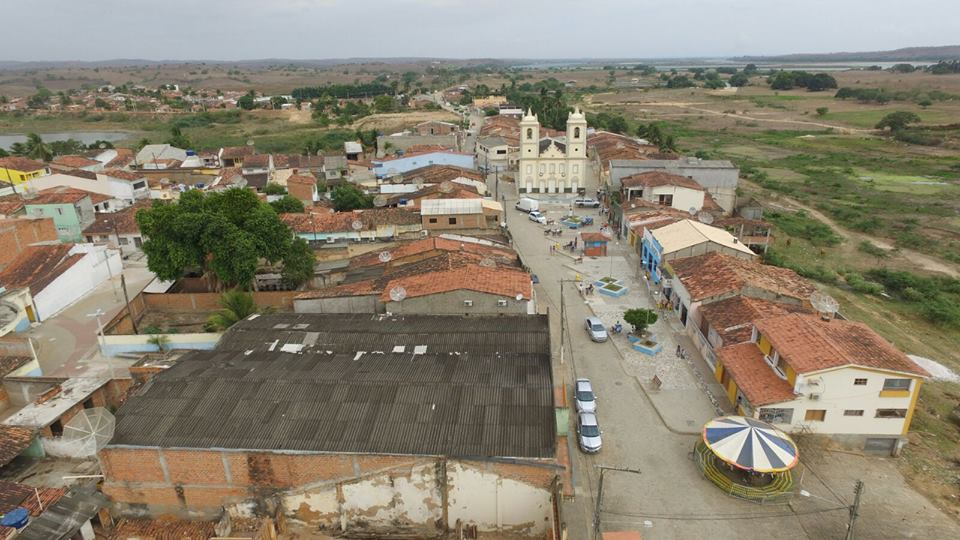
- Aerial view of downtown São Brás

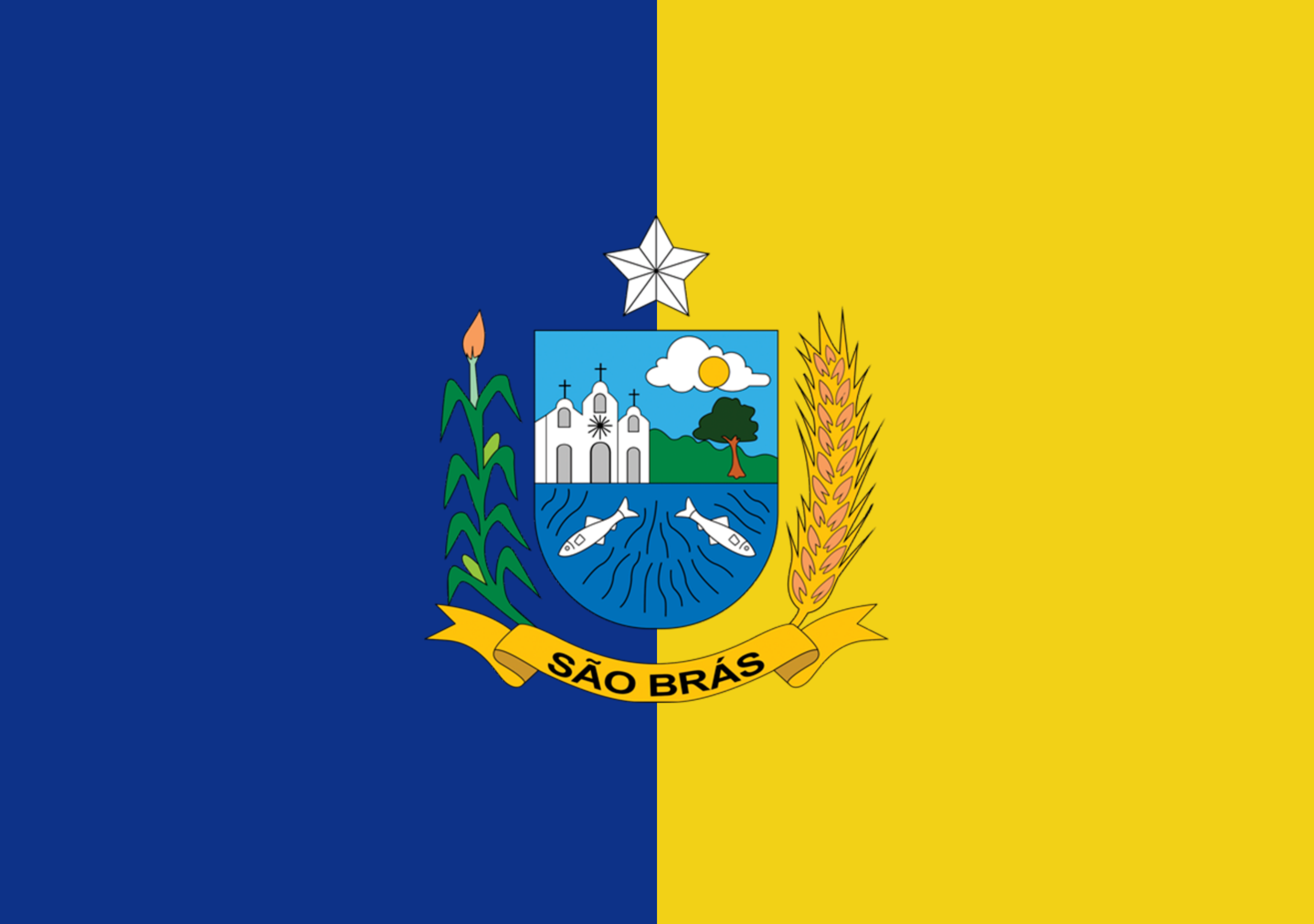
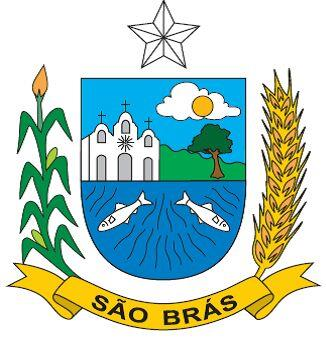
- Flag Coat of arms
- Etymology: In English "Saint Blaise", named after the parish's patron saint
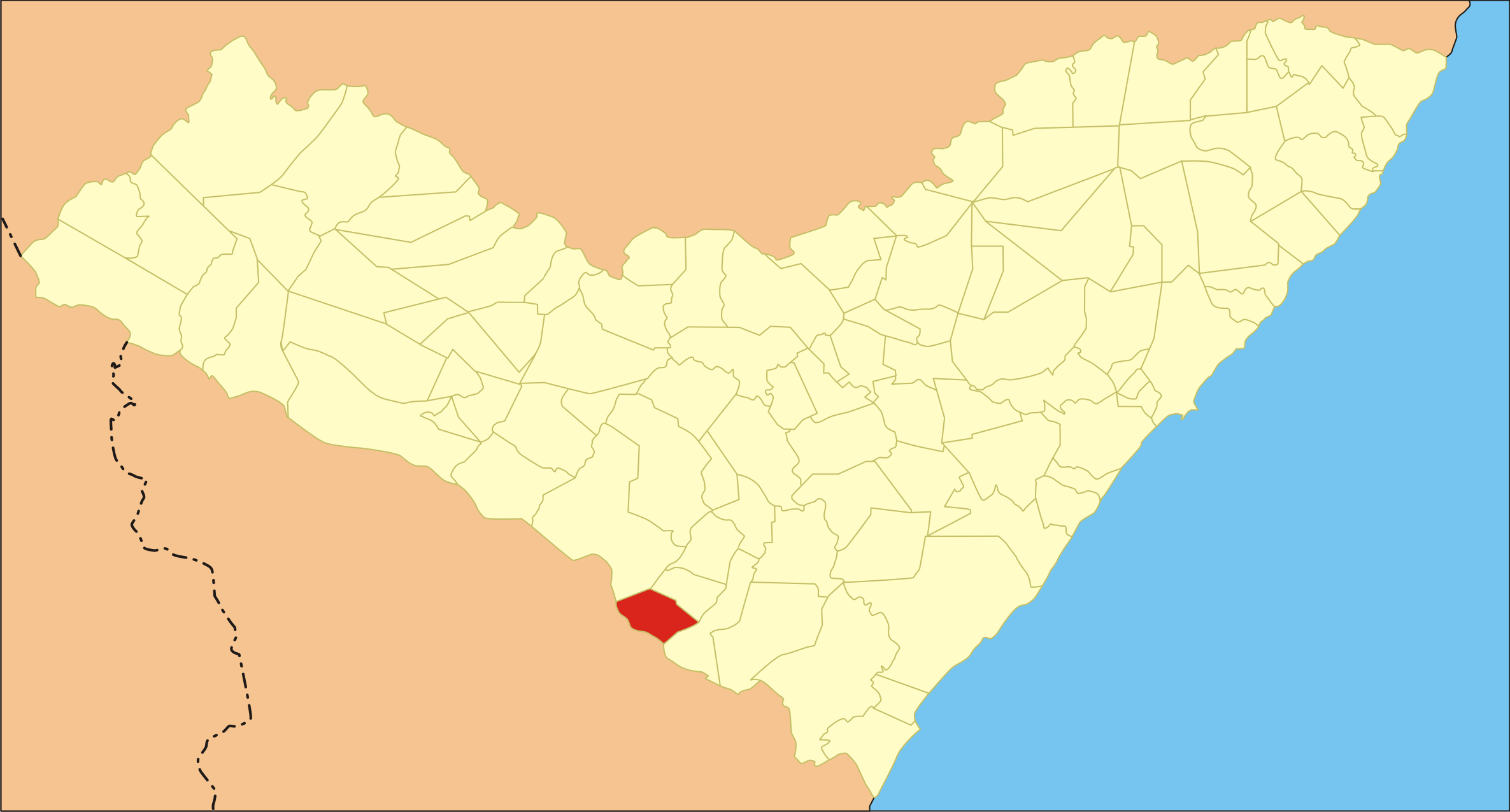
- Location of São Brás in Alagoas

- Location within Brazil Location within South America
- Coordinates: 10°7′40″S 36°54′2″W
- Country: Brazil
- Region: Northeast
- State: Alagoas
- Founded: 16 September 1935

Government
  - Mayor: Klinger Quirino Santos (MDB) (2025-2028)
  - Vice Mayor: Maria Fabiana da Silva Sandes (Republicanos) (2025-2028)

Area
  - Total: 139.038 km^{2} (53.683 sq mi)
- Elevation: 25 m (82 ft)

Population (2022)
  - Total: 6,555
  - Density: 47.15/km^{2} (122.1/sq mi)
- Demonym: São-braense (Brazilian Portuguese)
- Time zone: UTC-03:00 (Brasília Time)
- Postal code: 57380-000
- HDI (2010): 0.572 – medium
- Website: saobras.al.gov.br

São Brás (Central northeastern portuguese pronunciation: [ˈsɐ̃w ˈbɾas]) is a municipality located in the Brazilian state of Alagoas. Its population was 6,969 (2020) and its area is 140 km^{2} (54 sq mi).

== History ==
In 1746, the Kariri people and "Pragêz" were reported to be living in São Brás.

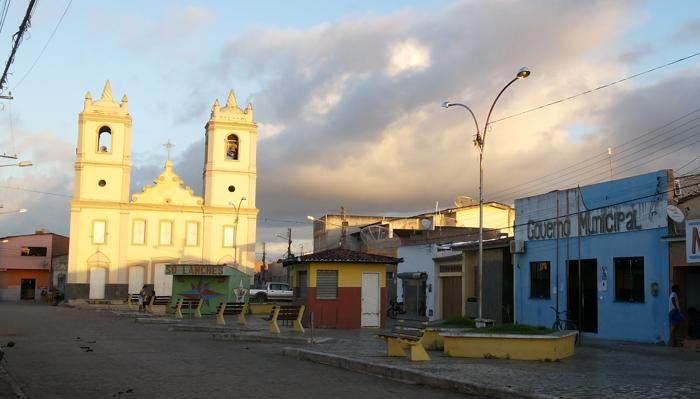
Plaza Monsenhor Fernando Santana in downtown São Brás

== See also ==
- List of municipalities in Alagoas
