= The Bishop Blaize =

Pub in Stretford, England

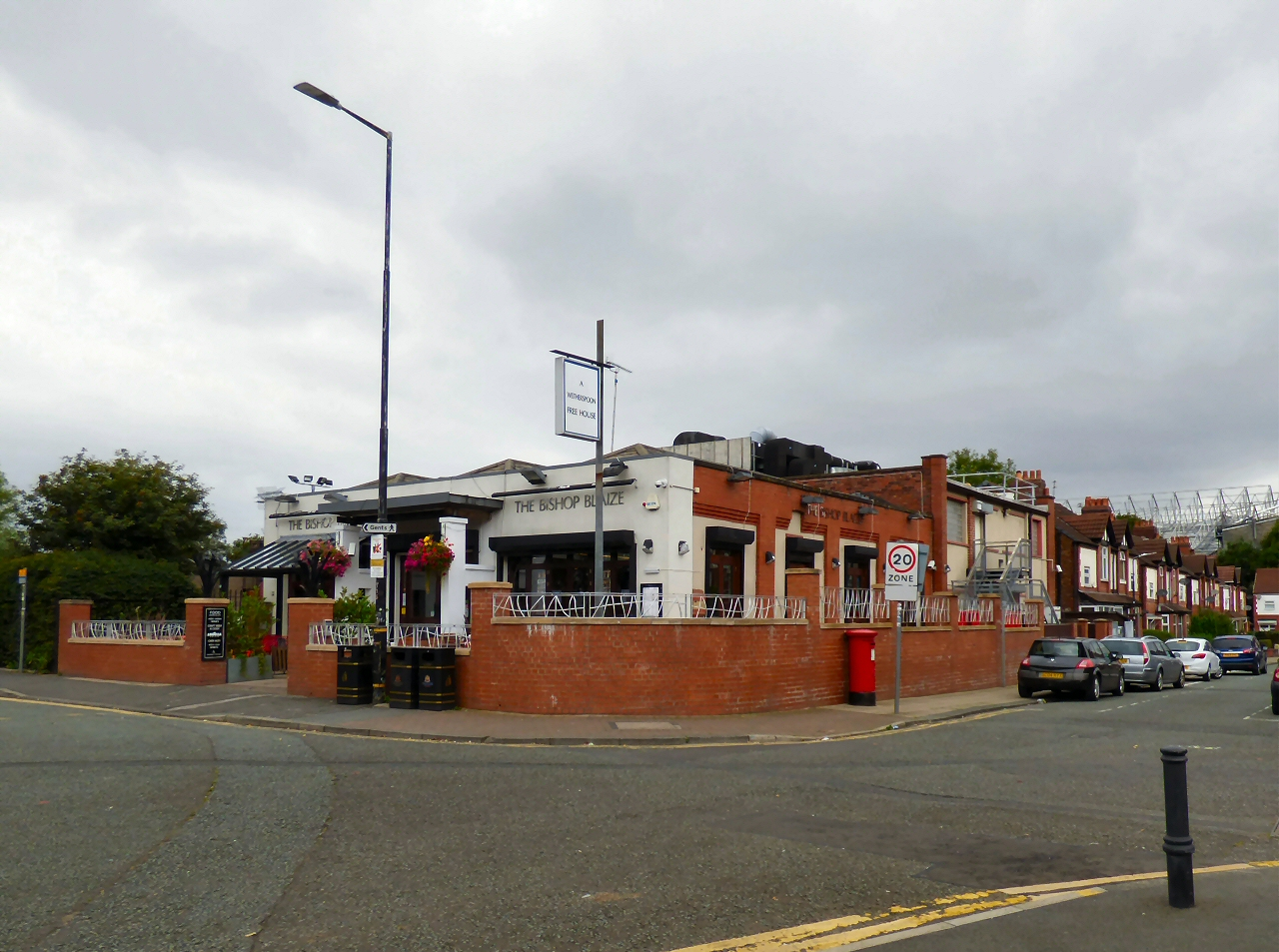
- Front of the pub

General information
- Status: Open
- Location: 708 Chester Road, Manchester, United Kingdom
- Owner: JD Wetherspoon

Height
- Architectural: Flat-roofed pub

Website
- The Bishop Blaize

The Bishop Blaize is a pub in Stretford, Greater Manchester, England. It plays an important part in the fan culture of Manchester United F.C. being the closest pub to Old Trafford. It is operated by Wetherspoons. It is the gathering point for the 'most passionate supporters' in the hours before a game. It has also been described as having 'unique charm'.

== History ==
The pub opened 24 May 2000.

In 2011 the pub was the target of graffiti referring to the Munich Air Crash. It has also been the target of anti-Glazer graffiti.

In 2016 a complaint was raised that prices increased on match days, as well as the end of the practise whereby regulars could still buy drinks at the ordinary price. The pub defended itself, highlighting that the practice of match day prices was entirely legal, and that it is required to cover the cost of doormen, who are only used on match days, as well as the increased number of staff.

In the same year, the pub hosted a charity sportsman dinner with Lee Sharpe as guest. A limited edition pale ale, Sharpies Blonde, was brewed for the occasion. £1,500 was raised. Later on in the year another charity dinner was held, this time with Denis Irwin as the guest, which raised £500.

In 2017 the pub was selected as a suitable location to host the Premier League trophy for fans to take a photo with.

In 2020, the pubs importance to supporting Manchester United fans was recognised by the Manchester Munich Memorial Foundation, who donated ribbons from a wreath laid in memory of the 1958 Munich Air Crash.

In 2023, The Guardian described the Bishop Blaize as a 'United pub' and commented on the lively engagement of staff at the pub to the Manchester United vs City rivalry.

Nicky Butt was the guest at a charity dinner in 2024 which raised £300.

In 2024 the pub was celebrated as being the best Wetherspoons pub in the country.

The Manchester Evening News sent reporter Adam Maidment to the pub to see whether it lived up to its title of being the best Wetherspoons in the country. Despite the unappealing façade, he described it as lively and popular inside, appealing to Manchester United-supporting tourists without neglecting regulars. He found that the regulars exhibited just the right level of self-centered ignorance towards strangers as is traditional. Down the predictable winding corridors, he celebrated signs of a lively community centered on the pub, which advertised its regular darts and poker nights. He also described the staff 'busy but very efficient and friendly'. Ultimately, Adam was surprised by how much of a 'good vibe' the pub had.

== Popular culture ==
The pub is recognised nationally and internationally as being a focal point for fans to visit. As the nearest pub to Old Trafford ground, it attracts a large number of supporters even when there is no match on. Visiting the pub before a match at Old Trafford is heralded by the Manchester Evening News as an essential part of a match day experience for Manchester United supporters.

Examples of foreign fans celebrating the pubs importance in a Manchester United excursions include Czeck and Slovakians, Danes, and Swedes.

The pub is also recognised by famous members of Manchester United, with Eric Cantona being known to enjoy the pub on occasions.

It has been used in the past as a recording venue for BBC Radio Manchester.

CAMRA has highlighted how outside of match days, the pub operates as a well used 'local'.

== Origin of name ==
The namesake of the pub is Saint Blaise, particularly as the patron saint of wool workers. According to tradition, there was a pub called the Bishop Blaise in the vicinity of the pub, which stood from the 1400s until 1863. James Bridley, the engineer of the Bridgewater Canal, stayed there when he had a nervous breakdown when the aqueduct at Barton appeared close to breaking. The original pub was further down Chester Road, on a site next to Stretford Town Hall which was later occupied by the Talbot Hotel.
