= St Blaise's Church =

18th-century Baroque church in Dubrovnik, Croatia

Coordinates: 42.6407°N 18.1103°E

- Crkva svetog Vlaha
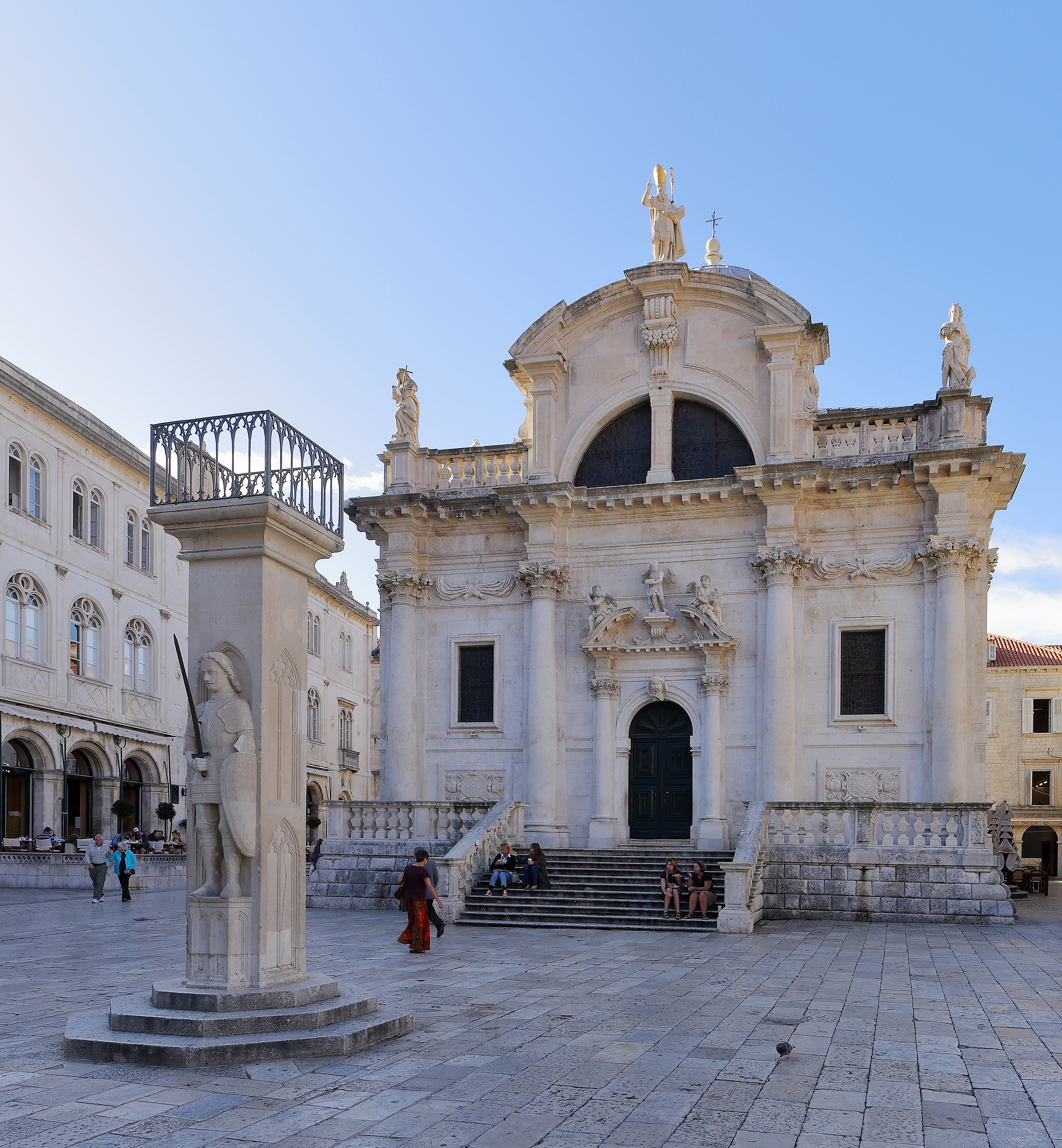
- St Blaise's Church in Dubrovnik
- St Blaise's Church
- Location: Dubrovnik
- Country: Croatia
- Denomination: Roman Catholic

History
- Status: Parish church
- Dedication: Saint Blaise
- Dedicated: 1715

Architecture
- Functional status: Active
- Architect: Marino Gropelli
- Architectural type: Church
- Style: Baroque
- Groundbreaking: 1706

Specifications
- Materials: Stone

Administration
- Archdiocese: Archdiocese of Dubrovnik

The Church of St. Blaise (Croatian: Crkva sv. Vlaha) is a Catholic Baroque church in Dubrovnik and one of the city's major sights. Saint Blaise (St. Vlaho), is the patron saint of the city of Dubrovnik and formerly the protector of the independent Republic of Ragusa. It is protected as the intangible cultural heritage by the Ministry of culture of Croatia.

== History ==
In February 1349, a month after the Black Death had arrived in Dubrovnik, the Great Council decided to build a Romanesque church dedicated to St Blaise as head and protector of the city. As the plague killed many heirs and executors, the Council further decided to use some of the properties that had reverted to the state as funds for the building of the church. Under the supervision of the craftsmen Andelo Lorrin, Butko and Mihajlo Petrovic the church was completed in three years. The church of St. Blaise became soon the second most important church of Dubrovnik after its cathedral.

The current church was built in 1715 by the Venetian architect and sculptor Marino Gropelli (1662–1728) on the foundations of the medieval church which, though it survived the earthquake of 1667 fairly well, burned down in 1706. He modeled the church on Sansovino's Venetian church of San Maurizio.

== Description ==
The church consists of a single square nave with a ground plan in the form of an inscribed Greek cross, an apse flanked by two sacristies and an oblong cupola in the center. A flight of stairs leads to the portal, decorated with statues of angels. The facade is divided by four Corinthian columns. On top of the facade is a semicircular gable and a balustrade with three statues by Marino Gropelli: a free standing Saint Blaise (in the middle) and personifications of Faith and Hope.

The barrel-vaulted interior is richly decorated in Baroque style. The Corinthian columns in the center bear the tambour of the cupola and lantern. The corners of the nave show blind cupolas. The main altar, in a combination of white and polychrome marble, shows in a high niche a precious, gilt silver Gothic statue of Saint Blaise, crafted in the 15th century by an unknown local master. The saint shows in his left hand a scale model of the Romanesque church which was destroyed by the earthquake in 1667. He is flanked by two kneeling angels. This statue was the only one to survive the fire of 1706. The domed antependium is decorated with two angels who unveil a curtain in front of a medallion.

The church includes the relics of Saint Silvan.

== Organ ==
The German workshop Gebrüder Rieger built the organ for the church in 1906 (op. 1242). The organ has a romantic disposition:

I^{st} manual C–f^{3}
Principal	8′
Bourdon	16′
Gamba	8′
Gedeckt	8′
Octave	4′
Rauschquinte II

II^{nd} manual C–f^{3}
Geigen Principal	8′
Salicional	8′
Rohrflöte	8′
Octave	4′
Dolce	4′

Pedal C–d^{1}
Subbass	16′
Cello	8′

The transmission is electro-digital, having been pneumatic until 2001. The restoration of the organ will begin in 2026, and will be conducted by the German company Weimbs Orgelbau GmbH.

== Gallery ==
The church in 1890

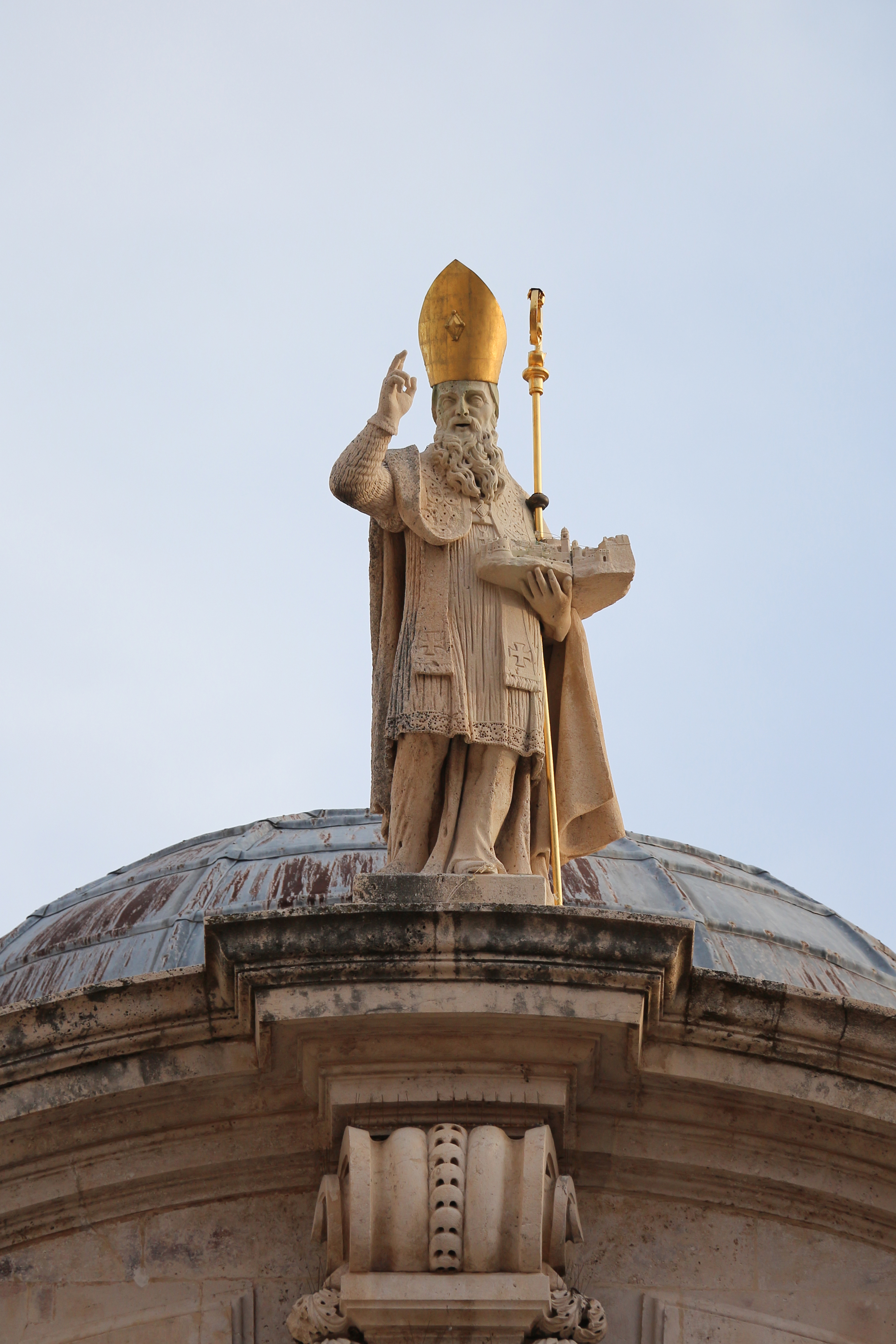
Statue of St. Blaise in Dubrovnik

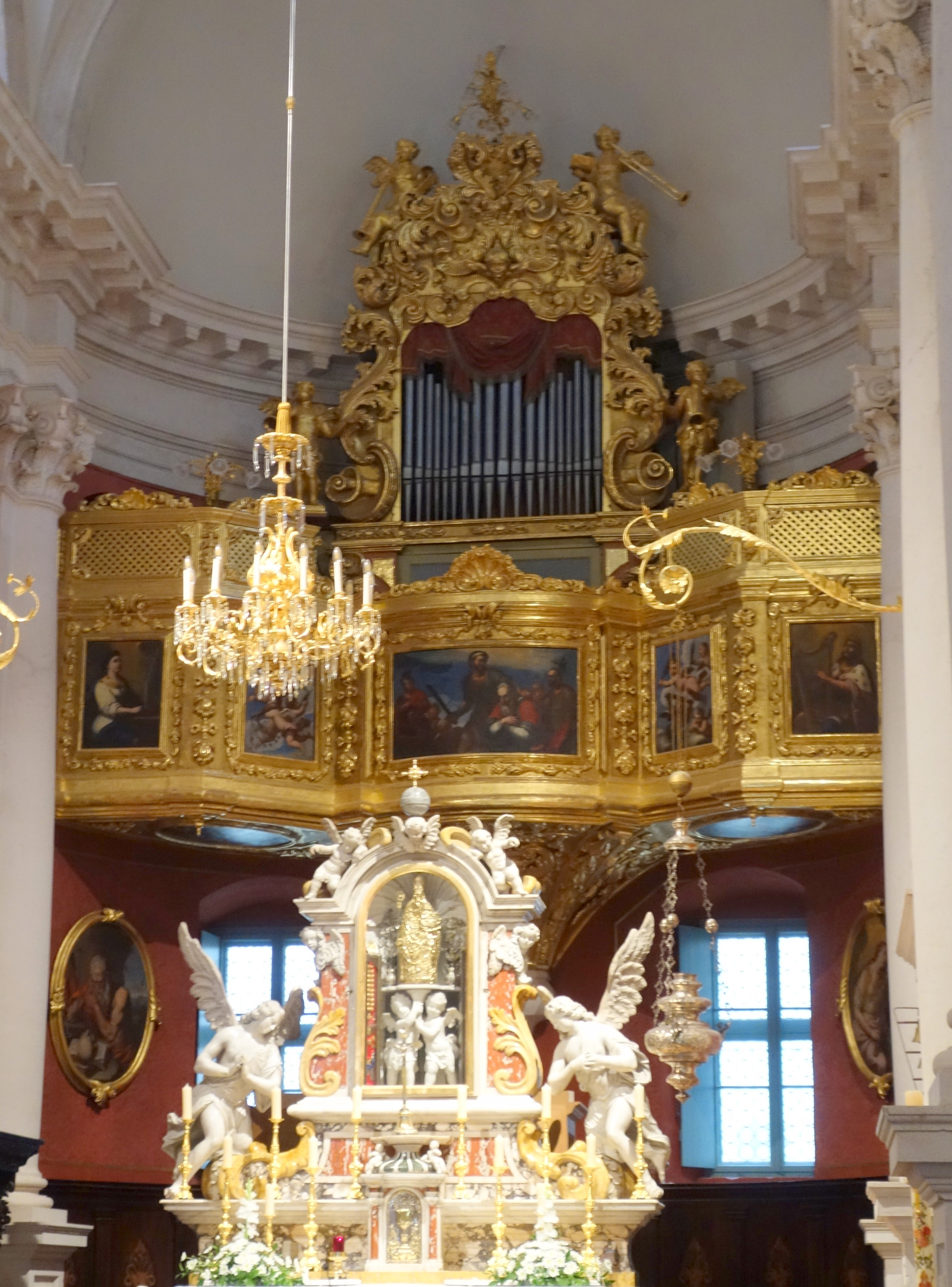
Interior and organ

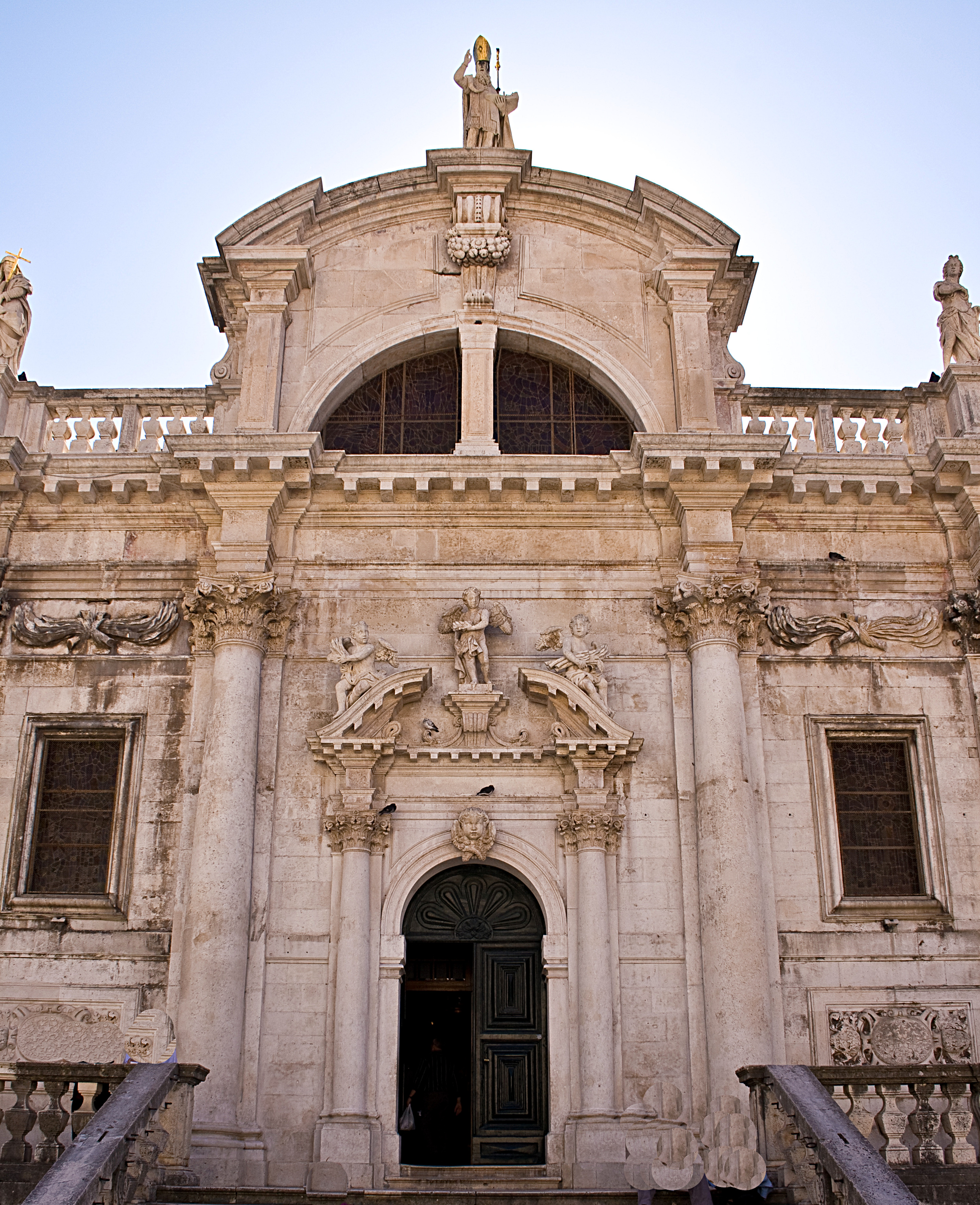
Portal and entrance detail

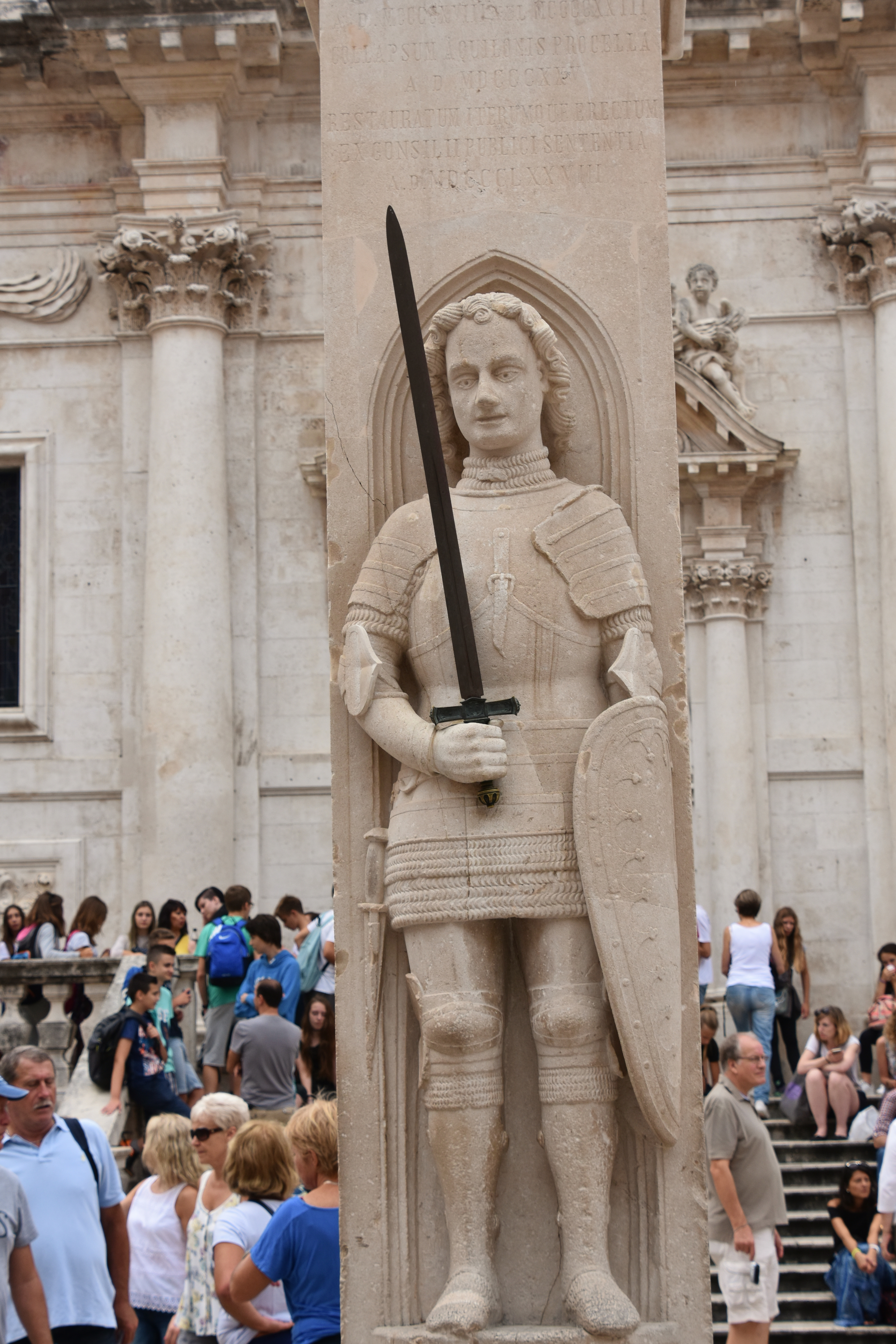
Statue of Orlando at the front
