= Festivity of Saint Blaise, the patron of Dubrovnik =

Holiday on February 3 in Dubrovnik, Croatia

Festivity of Saint Blaise Festa Svetog Vlaha
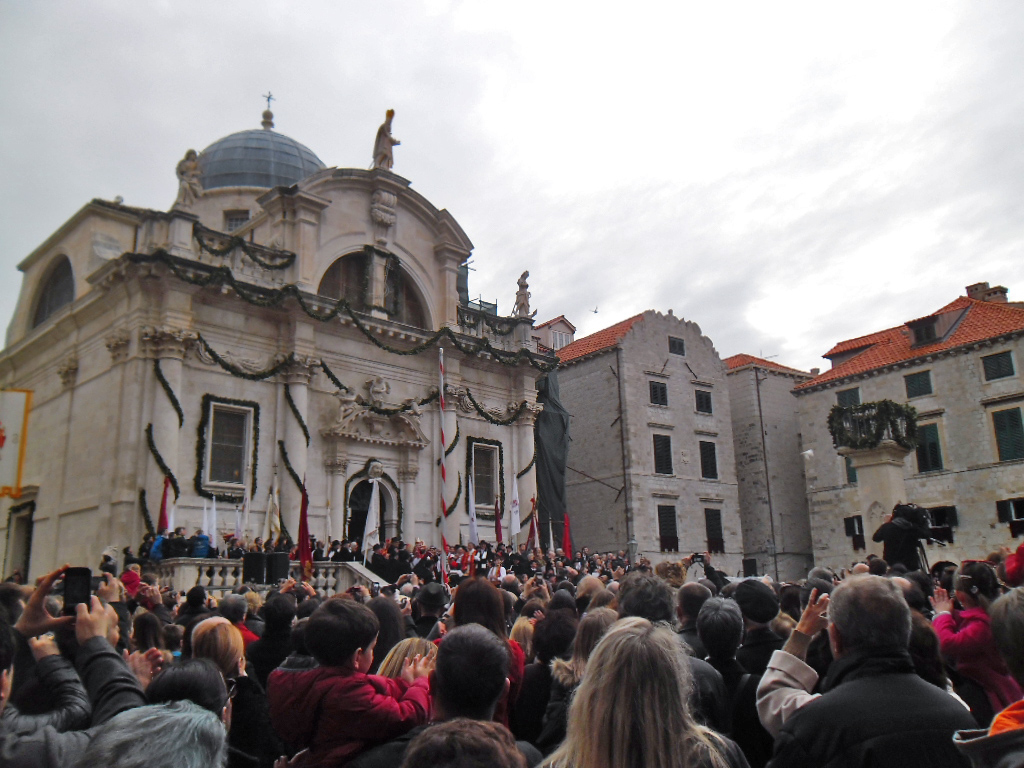
- Release of doves in front of Dubrovnik Cathedral
- Date: February 3
- Frequency: Annual
- Locations: Dubrovnik, Croatia
- Inaugurated: 972

Festivity of Saint Blaise, the patron of Dubrovnik
- UNESCO Intangible Cultural Heritage
- Country: Croatia
- Reference: 00232
- Region: Europe and North America

Inscription history
- Inscription: 2009 (4th session)
- List: Representative

The Festivity of Saint Blaise, the patron of Dubrovnik (Croatian: Festa Svetog Vlaha, zaštitnika Dubrovnika) is a festivity organized on February 3 continuously since the year 972 AD in the City of Dubrovnik, Croatia on the occasion of the celebration of Saint Blaise's day. The festivity is based on the legend of the appearance of St. Blaise, who helped the people of Dubrovnik in defending their town against the Republic of Venice. It is attended by many people, including residents of the city, surrounding areas, other parts of Croatia, and neighboring countries, tourists, and representatives of state and local authorities of the Roman Catholic Church. It was recognized as a UNESCO Intangible Cultural Heritage in 2009. Festivity is also the Day of the City of Dubrovnik.

The Croatian Ministry of Culture describes the festivity with these words: "Besides the spiritual significance, Festivity in particular forms social relations and rules as well as the quality of government. The Festivity as an expression of worship of a saint marked the whole culture and partly natural area of the City and the surrounding area, and through the participation of individuals and groups from other places in the country as well as those from neighboring countries, encourages intercultural dialogue."

Since 2014, Matica hrvatska's Brussel's branch organizes the festivity in Brussel.

== Legend ==
After the ancient Greek colony Epidaurum was destroyed by Avars and Slavic invaders in the 7th century, refugees from Epidaurus fled to the nearby island, Laas or Laus, (meaning "stone" in Greek), from which Ragusa evolved into Dubrovnik. Immediately after the new settlement began to develop, greedy neighbors became envious of it and began to look for chances to destroy it. According to legend, while on their way to the Levant in the year 972 the Venetians, anchored themselves near Gruž and Lokrum under the pretense of restocking food, while their real intention was to conquer Dubrovnik. Saint Blaise appeared to the priest Stojko while he was praying in the Church of St. Stephen, and ordered him to tell the Dubrovnik Senate about the real intentions of the Venetians so the Senate could prepare a defense. The people of Dubrovnik managed to prepare their defense, thus forcing the Venetians to retreat. To thank St. Blaise, the people of Dubrovnik decided to declare him Dubrovnik's main patron saint instead of the previous Sergius and Bacchus.

== Description ==
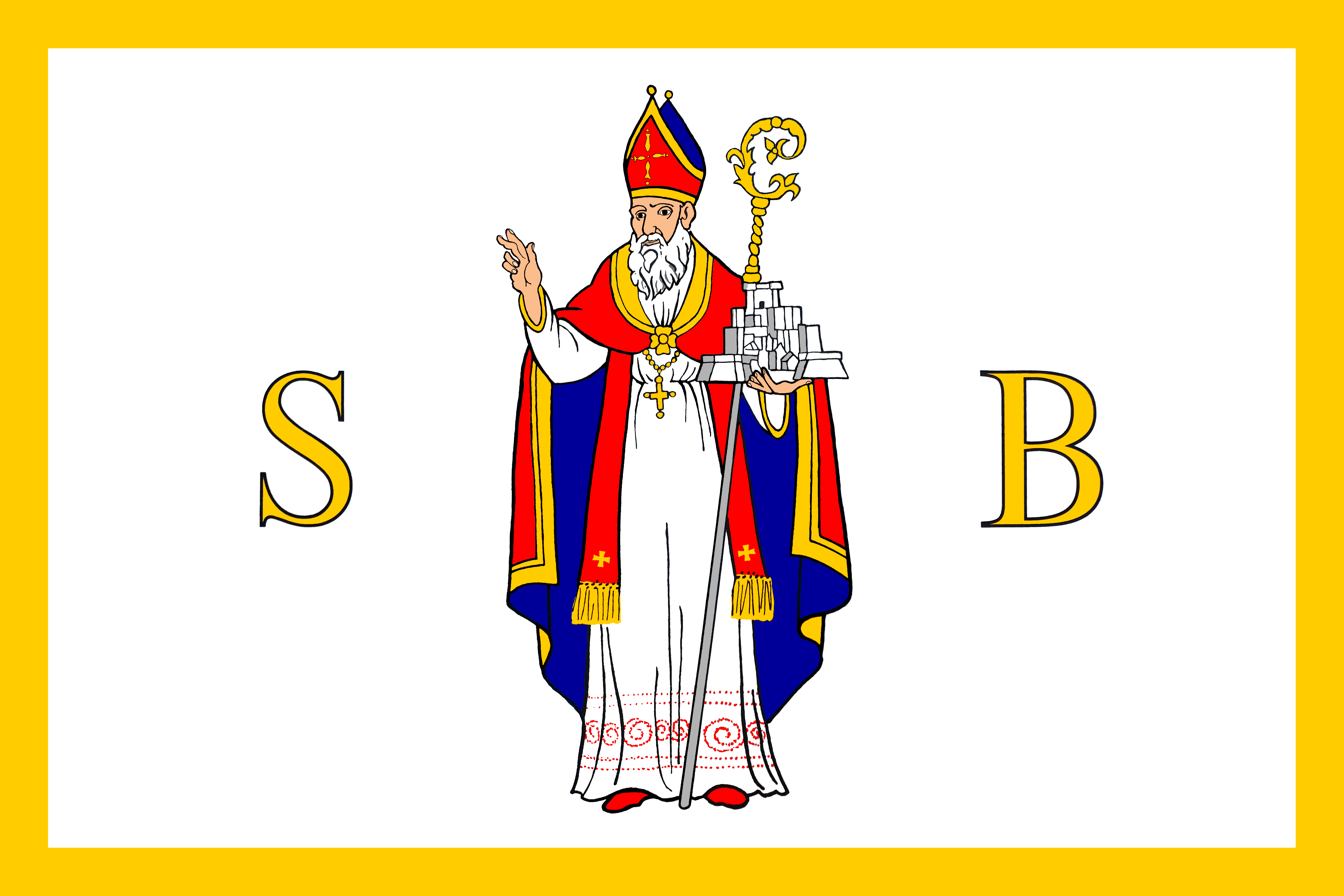
Flag of Dubrovnik Republic with Saint Blaise holding City model

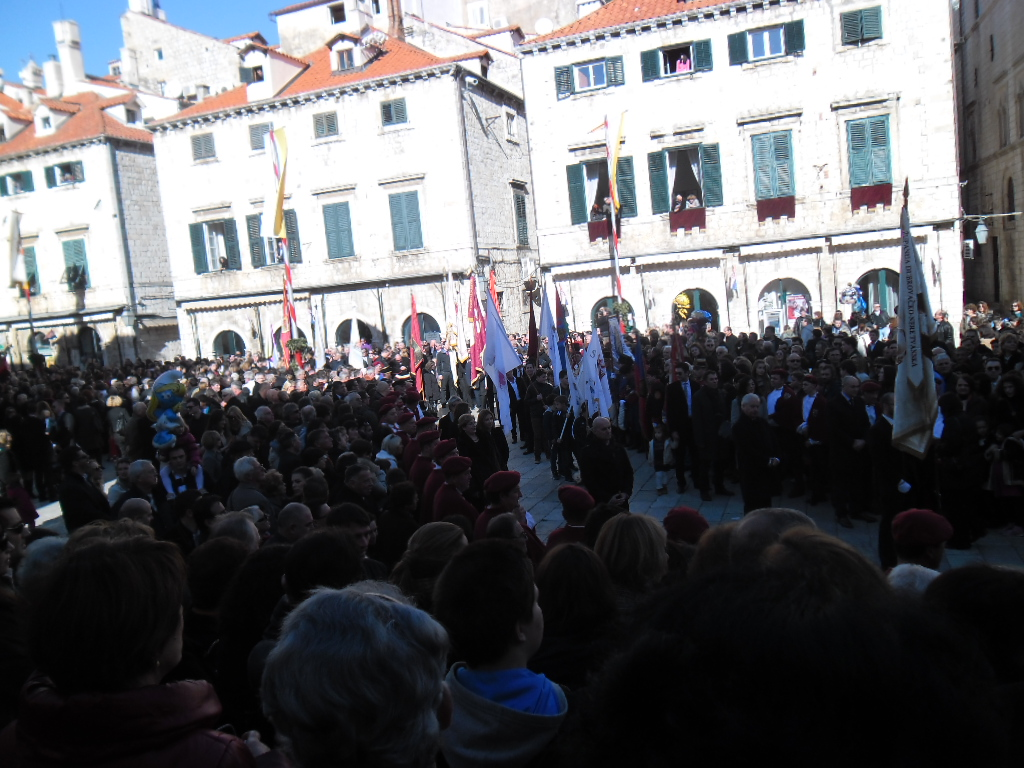
Procession held on 3 February 2014

The Festivity of St. Blaise was first celebrated in the year 972 and was a feast for all the inhabitants of the Dubrovnik Republic. To allow everyone to participate, the so-called "Sloboština of St. Blaise" was introduced. It was a time period during which every offender, convict, and exile could freely come into the City for two days before and two days after the Festivity, while nobody could hold him accountable. Sloboština was later expanded to seven days before and seven days after the Festivity. The entire Republic of Dubrovnik was hugging in the City for the Festivity. Those who couldn't go would celebrate at home with their church banners and the national costume. They would thank St. Blaise for his protection in the past and recommend themselves, and their families, for his protection in the future.

The Festivity starts on the day of Our Lady of Candelora, which is celebrated on February 2, with the releasing of white doves, which symbolize freedom and peace, in front of Dubrovnik Cathedral, and by raising Saint Blaise's banner on Orlando's column. On the day of Our Lady of Candelora, people repeat the old dictum: "Candelora, winter goodbye, Saint Blaise follows her and says it is a lie." On the day of the Festivity, on February 3, the numerous faithful and church dignitaries come to the City from nearby areas carrying the saint's relics across Stradun and city streets in a procession. Under a baldachin is relic of the shroud of Jesus. During the procession the Bishop of Dubrovnik and priests carry St. Blaise's relics while people respectfully kiss the hand of the bishop, touch the relics, and pray for themselves and the city. In front of Dubrovnik Cathedral, also known as Saint Blaise's Church, the banners salute Saint Blaise, while priests bless the people using two crossed candles since it is believed that Saint Blaise protects the throat. One of the attractions of the Festivity is a group of trombunjeri who carry short and broad rifles on their shoulders which had been used in the past to create noise and frighten away enemies of the City. They fire their guns before entering the City, on present-day Brsalje Street, where, during the time of the Republic, shooting rifles and cannons was practiced. After the end of the festivity, procession banners go with their flags to their villages in order to convey St. Blaise's blessings to all those who couldn't come to the City. The Festivity has changed over the centuries with each new generation adapting it to their ideas and making it modern.
