= Order of Saint Blaise =

Order founded in Armenia

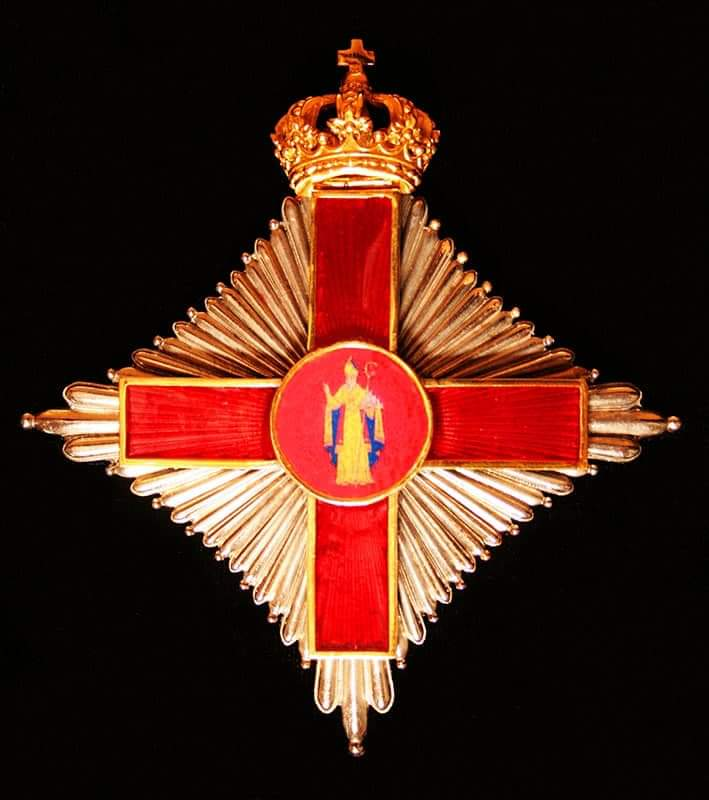
- Breast Star

Awarded by Armenian Kingdom of Cilicia
- Type: Military order
- Established: 12th century

Precedence
- Next (higher): Unknown
- Next (lower): Unknown

The Order of Saint Blaise was an order founded in Armenia in the 12th century. It took its name from Saint Blaise, patron saint of the Armenian kingdom of Cilicia.

The order was divided into the religious, who were charged with the holy offices and missionary work among the unbelievers, and the fighters, who defended the country against the attacks of the Muslims. It rendered great services for a century and only disappeared when Armenia was conquered by the Turks.

According to Thomas Robson (The British Herald, 1830), the order was also called the Order of St. Bass.

== Bibliography ==
- La Grande Encyclopedie s.v. Saint-Blaise (Ordre de).
