= Saint Silvan =

Christian martyr

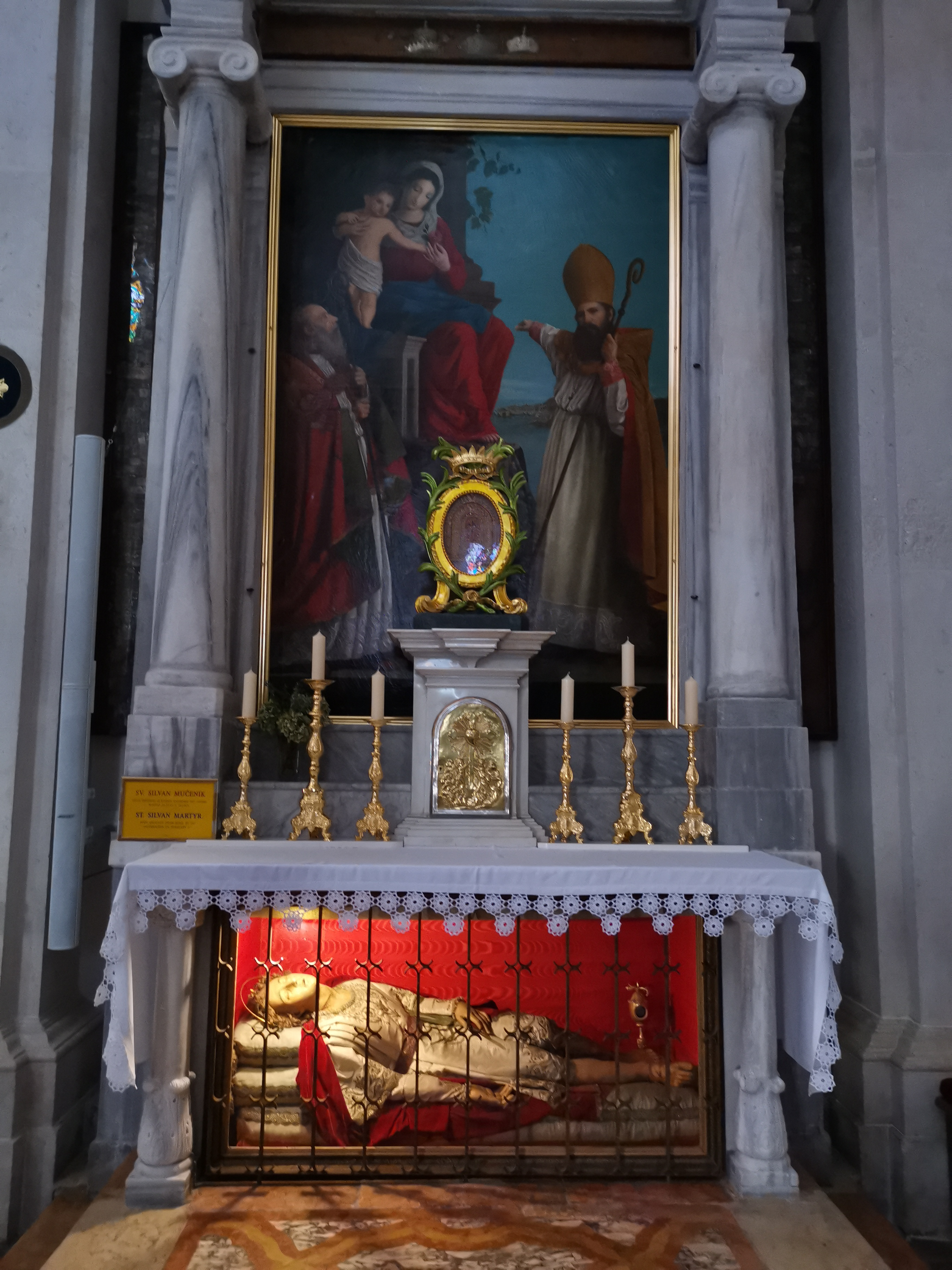
Silvan in St Blaise's Church Dubrovnik

Saint Silvan was a Christian martyr possibly from the fourth century and buried in St Blaise's Church in Dubrovnik since the mid of the 19th century. Saint Silvan, of whom not much is known, is commemorated on 30 July.

== Description ==
According to William Frederick Wingfield, the skeleton of St. Silvanus was given together with a wax figure by Pope Pius IX to the city of Dubrovnik. The figure shows a young man with an embroidered cross on the front of his garment, indicating that he may have been a priest or possibly even a higher ranking cleric.

== Identification ==
A number of Silvans have been canonized as saints, and it is unclear which Saint Silvan is entombed at the Church of Saint Blaise. Most sources claim that the Saint Silvan at Dubrovnik was martyred in the 4th century — a gruesome wound on his neck suggests the manner of his martyrdom — which may indicate he was Saint Silvanus, Bishop of Emesa, Phoenicia, martyred c. 311. Other saints named Silvan died in various ways (e.g., thrown off a cliff or of natural causes) or at an age suggesting they cannot be the Saint Silvan at Dubrovnik. Still others are believed to be buried elsewhere.
