= San Biagio island =

Island in Lake Garda, Italy

Native name: Isola di San Biagio
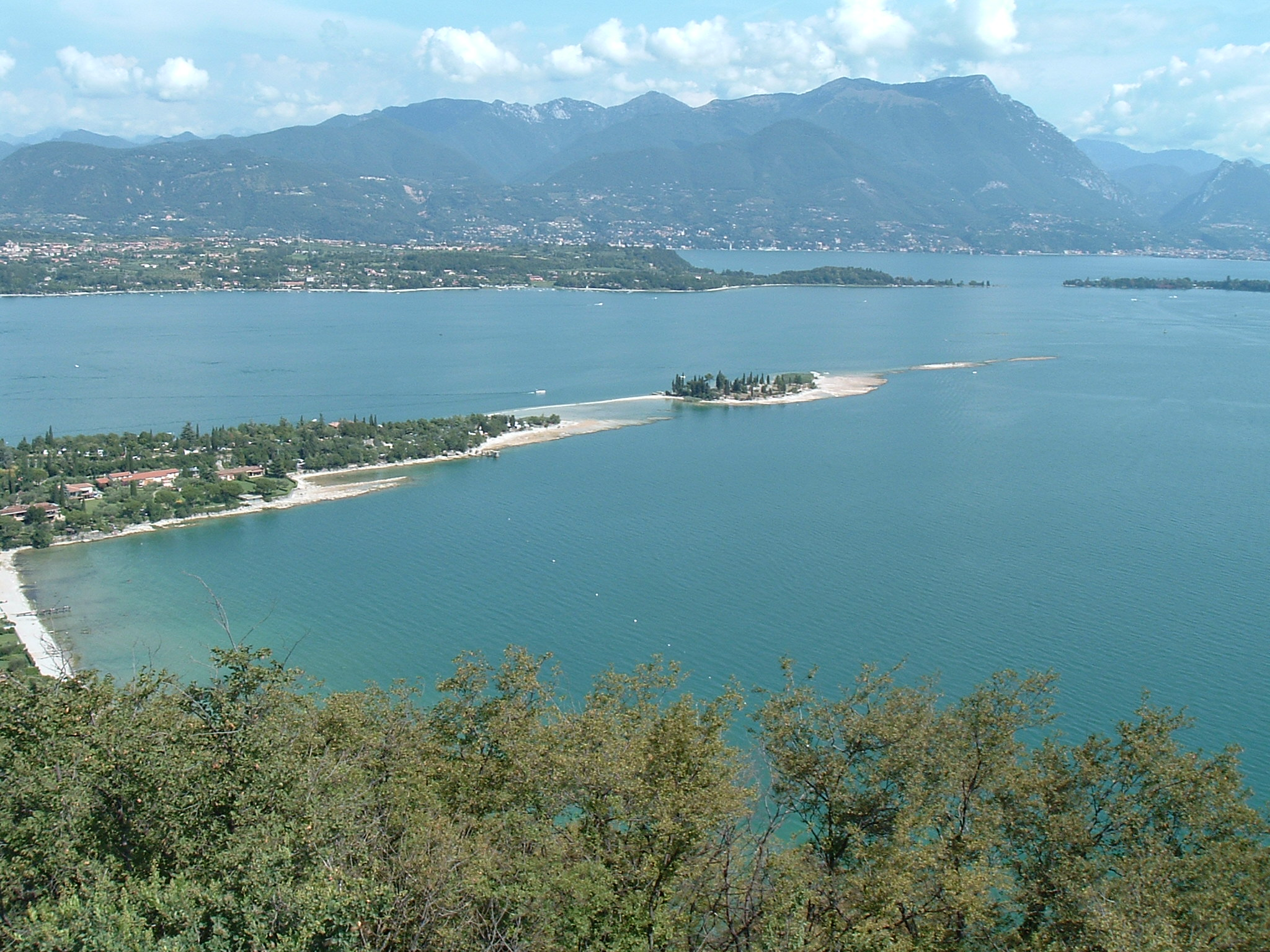
- The Bay of Manerba with the Isola di San Biagio.

Geography
- Coordinates: 45°34′07″N 10°34′18″E
- Adjacent to: Lake Garda
- Area: 1 ha (2.5 acres)approximate

Administration
- Italy

Demographics
- Population: 0 Census 2001

San Biagio island (Italian: Isola di San Biagio German: Insel San Biagio), also known as Isola dei Conigli (Hare or rabbit island), is an island in the north Italian Lake Garda.

== Geography ==
San Biagio island is the second largest of the lake's five islands and lies about 200 meters off the western shore in the Bay of Manerba and San Felice in the province of Brescia. It is an extension of the Punta Belvedere peninsula. When the water level is low, it can be reached on foot along a thin strip of land. The island has an area of about one hectare, is flat and covered with vegetation. It has a small, rocky bump in the middle.

== Names ==
The island's official namesake is Saint Blaise of Sebaste. The more popularly used name "Isola dei Conigli" comes from the hares and rabbits that used to be common on the island.

In addition to the nickname "Rabbit Island", the Isola di San Biagio is also known as the "Musician Island". Open-air classical and jazz concerts are often held here in summer.

== History ==
As far as is known, the island was never permanently inhabited. In the Middle Ages however, hermits are said to have lived on the island at times. According to various sources, mainlanders abandoned their animals, especially rabbits, because they could not leave the island. For this reason, the island is said to have been the hunting ground of wealthy villa owners in the area from the 7th century.

Silvan Cattaneo, a 16th-century orator, poet and philosopher, called it "inhabited by hares and rabbits and therefore a popular hunting ground".

Before the island developed into a popular tourist destination, it was used by nearby gun manufacturer Beretta to test guns and ammunition in the 1950s.

In the Archaeological Museum of Rocca di Manerba del Garda, tombstones from Roman times found on Isola San Biagio can be seen.

Since 2016, the Isola di San Biagio has been part of the nature and water protection area Riserva naturale della Rocca, del Sasso e Parco Lacuale.
