= Blessing of the Throats =

Christian ritual

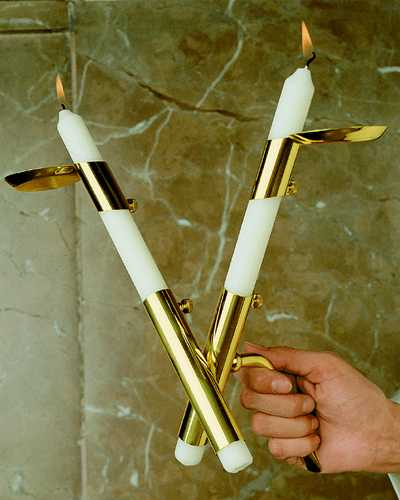
Candles crossed in a special candelabrum used to bless throats

The Blessing of the Throats is a sacramental of the Roman Catholic Church, ordinarily celebrated on February 3, the feast day of Saint Blaise of Sebaste (modern Sivas, Turkey). It is also celebrated in some of the Eastern Catholic Churches, and in parishes of the Anglican Communion on the same day as a commemoration.

The Order of the Blessing of Throats on the Feast of Saint Blaise is in the Book of Blessings (de Benedictionibus). However, it is absent in the Latin original of the revised Roman Ritual (1984).

== Background ==
Article 1625 from The Book of Blessings contains a brief historical background of the blessing of throats:

Saint Blaise was the bishop of Sebaste in Armenia during the fourth century. Very little is known about his life. According to various accounts... he was a physician before becoming a bishop. His cult spread throughout the entire Church in the Middle Ages because he was reputed to have miraculously cured a little boy who nearly died because of a fishbone in his throat. From the eighth century he has been invoked on behalf of the sick, especially those afflicted with illnesses of the throat.

Details regarding the miraculous healing of the boy vary. One account relates that the miracle occurred during the journey to take Blaise to prison when he placed his hand on the boy's head and prayed; another that the miracle happened while Blaise was in prison when he picked up two candles provided to him and formed a cross around the boy's throat.

The use of candles for the blessing of throats stems from the candles that Blaise used while in prison. When an old woman's pig had been miraculously rescued from a wolf by Saint Blaise, she would visit him in prison, bringing him food and candles to bring him light in his dark cell.

== Ritual ==
=== In the modern Roman Rite ===
Articles 1626 and 1627 explain when and how the blessing takes place:

The blessing of throats may be given by a priest, deacon, or a lay minister who follows the rites and prayers designated for a lay minister. If the blessing is conferred during Mass, the blessing follows the homily and general intercessions, or, for pastoral reasons, the prayer of blessing may take the place of the final blessing of the Mass. When the blessing is given outside Mass, it is preceded by a brief celebration of the word of God. If the blessing is to be celebrated at Morning Prayer or Evening Prayer, it is given after the reading and responsory (and homily) and before the gospel canticle. The blessing may be given by touching the throat of each person with two candles blessed on the feast of the Presentation of the Lord (February 2) and which have been joined together in the form of a cross.

The candles may be joined by a red ribbon, the color of martyrdom. Although it is the general custom to touch the throat with the candles, it is not required, especially if the candles are lit. The candles may be held over the person.

If all cannot be blessed individually, the celebrant, without candles, extends his hands over the assembly and says the prayer of blessing.

The following blessing is said:

Through the intercession of Saint Blaise, bishop and martyr, may God deliver you from every disease of the throat and from every other illness. In the name of the Father, and of the Son, and of the Holy Spirit.

The priest or deacon makes the sign of the cross over the recipient as the blessing is said. If necessary, laypersons are permitted to give the blessing of the throats, but are instructed not to make the sign of the cross.

=== In the older Roman Rite ===
Old editions of the Rituale Romanum gave the following formula for blessing the candles independently of the February 2 Candlemas blessing:

V. Our help is in the name of the Lord.

R. Who made heaven and earth.

V. Lord, hear my prayer.

R. And let my prayer come to you.

V. The Lord be with you.

R. And with your spirit.

Let us pray.

O God most powerful and most kind, Who didst create all the different things in the world by the Word alone, and Whose will it was that this Word by Which all things were made should become incarnate for the remaking of mankind; Thou Who art great and limitless, worthy of reverence and praise, the worker of wonders; for Whose sake the glorious Martyr and Bishop, St. Blaise, joyfully gained the palm of martyrdom, never shrinking from any kind of torture in confessing his faith in Thee; Thou Who didst give to him, amongst other gifts, the prerogative of curing by Thy power every ailment of men’s throats; humbly we beg Thee in Thy majesty not to look upon our guilt, but, pleased by his merits and prayers, in Thine awe-inspiring kindness, to bless this wax created by Thee and to sanctify it, pouring into it Thy grace; so that all who in good faith shall have their throats touched by this wax may be freed from every ailment of their throats through the merit of his suffering, and, in good health and spirits, may give thanks to Thee in Thy holy Church and praise Thy glorious name, which is blessed for ever and ever. Through our Lord, Jesus Christ, Thy Son, Who with Thee lives and reigns, in the unity of the Holy Spirit, God, world without end. R. Amen.

After which, the blessing is made by the ordained minister in these words:

Per intercessionem sancti Blasii, Episcopi et Martyris, liberet te Deus a malo gutturis, et a quolibet alio malo.

Then, he makes the sign of the cross over the persons head:

In nomine Patris, et Filii, + et Spiritus Sancti. Amen.

=== In the Anglican tradition ===
The blessing of throats is also used in the parishes of the Personal Ordinariates as well as in Anglican and Episcopalian communities.

=== In the Eastern Churches ===
In the Armenian Catholic Church, the neck is anointed with oil on a cotton swab or on a candle. The blessing of throats does not appear to be practiced in the Armenian Apostolic Church.

A Ukrainian Greek Catholic ritual of the blessing of the throats also exists.

The blessing of throats is also practiced in some Orthodox communities on February 11, the feast day of Saint Blaise on the Eastern Orthodox liturgical calendar.

== Variations and customs ==
In Germany and in other places, the blessing of throats is given with lighted candles. It is frequently also given on the evening of Candlemas (the previous day), sometimes even on the proximate Sunday, when more people attend Mass than on St. Blaise's proper feast day.

In the Church of San Carlo ai Catinari in Rome, which is dedicated to St. Blaise as co-patron, the blessing is given with a relic of Saint Blaise, in a crystal placed on a large ring, pressed against the throat.

In certain Hispanic countries (e.g., Spain and Mexico), a ribbon is given to be worn around the neck for the nine days following the blessing.

The older Rituale Romanum provides a blessing for bread, wine, water and fruit for the relief of throat ailments on the feast of Saint Blaise.
