= Monte San Biagio (Maratea) =

Mountain in Italy

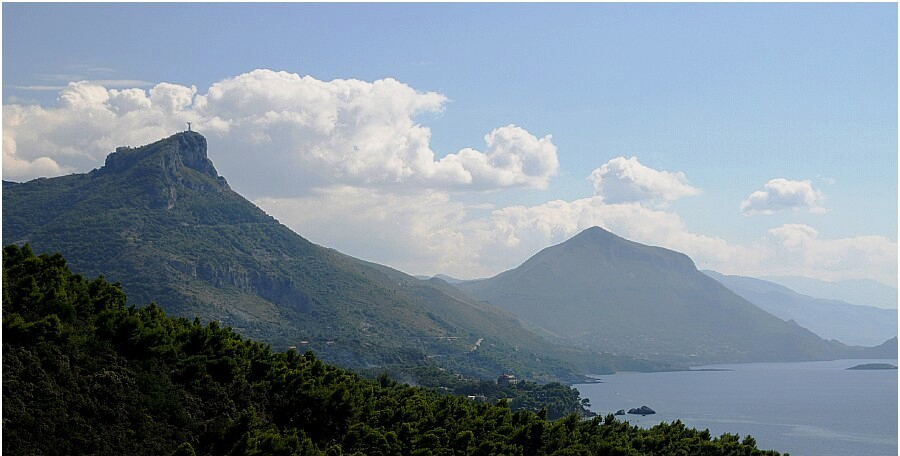

Highest point
- Elevation: 620 m (2,030 ft)
- Coordinates: 39°59′22″N 15°43′19″E

Geography
- Location within Italy
- Location: Basilicata, Italy
- Parent range: Southern Apennines

Monte San Biagio is a mountain of Basilicata, southern Italy. It is a popular destination for hiking from Maratea, and from the top there are views of a nearby town.
