= San Biagio, Lendinara =

Church in Lendinara, Veneto, Italy

Coordinates: 45.082456°N 11.597564°E

San Biagio is a Neoclassic style, Roman Catholic church in the city of Lendinara, in the province of Rovigo, region of Veneto, Italy. The church facade presently faces the Adigetto River.

== History ==
An oratory dedicated to San Biagio had existed at the site since the 13th century. It was affiliated with the Order of the Umiliati. In 1478, the property was transferred to Gerolimini order (now extant), and then a Franciscan order in 1669 till 1769. From 1803 to 1813, a reconstruction was completed using designs by Giacomo Baccari. The facade was simplified by the architect Jappelli, who declined to add two bell-towers. The new church was consecrated in 1884. Stained glass windows were added in 1922. The organ dates 1926. Some describe the interior as resembling Palladio's Venetian church of Il Redentore.

The first altar on the left has a Crucifixion with Saints Mark and Carlo Borromeo attributed to Malombra. The next altar has an Exaltation of the Eucharist by Franciscan Saints (1725) by Gregorio Lazzarini. The third altarpiece is a St Antony and Angels (1942) by A. M. Nardi. In the ambulatory is an Immaculate Conception with Saints Biagio and Francis (circa 1725) also by Lazzarini.

In the first altar on the right is a 19th-century canvas of St Margaret of Cortona. The second altar has a canvas with the Saints Nicola, Francis of Assisi, Antony Abbot, and Andrew Apostle (circa 1585) by Andrea Vicentino. The 3rd altar on the right has a Visitation (circa 1525) in the style of Dosso Dossi. The 4th altar on the right has a Madonna della Cintura and Nine Saints (1690 ca.) by Antonio Zanchi, brought here from the church of the Cappuccini di Este in the 19th century.

The wooden Baldacchino over the main altar was completed by the 18th-century artist Giuseppe Fava. The funeral monument to the jurist Gaspare Malmignati (1542), on the wall above the entrance to the sacristy, arrived here from the suppressed convent of San Francesco.
