= Sphagnurus =

Scientific classification
- Kingdom: Fungi
- Division: Basidiomycota
- Class: Agaricomycetes
- Order: Agaricales
- Family: Lyophyllaceae
- Genus: Sphagnurus; Redhead & V. Hofstetter (2014)

Type species
- Sphagnurus paluster (Peck) Redhead & V. Hofstetter (2014)

Synonyms
- Agaricus paluster Peck (1872); Bryophyllum palustre (Peck) Vizzini (2014); Collybia palustris (Peck) A.H. Smith (1936); Lyophyllum palustre (Peck) Singer (1943); Mycena palustris (Peck) Sacc. (1887); Tephrocybe palustris (Peck) Donk (1962); Tephrophana palustris (Peck) Kühner (1938)

Genus of fungi

Sphagnurus is a parasitic mushroom genus in the family Lyophyllaceae that creates conspicuous dead patches on peat moss (Sphagnum) in bogs. The genus contains one species known to inhabit Eurasia and North America. Phylogenetically the genus is closest to, but is isolated from species now classified in the genus Sagaranella Prior to molecular analyses, the most recent classification put it in the genus Tephrocybe, but that genus is allied to Termitomyces.

Sphagnurus paluster, the single species in the genus is pale grey and has a mycenoid stature (i.e. has a conical pileus, a narrow elongated stipe and lacks an annulus or volva). Its basidiospores are nonamyloid and smooth. It lacks cheilocystidia and pleurocystidia. Clamp connections are present.

== Etymology ==
The name Sphagnurus is supposed to be derived from the name of its host Sphagnum and Latin -urus, meaning “tail". The ancient Greek word οὐρά however means “tail".

== See also ==
- List of Agaricales genera
