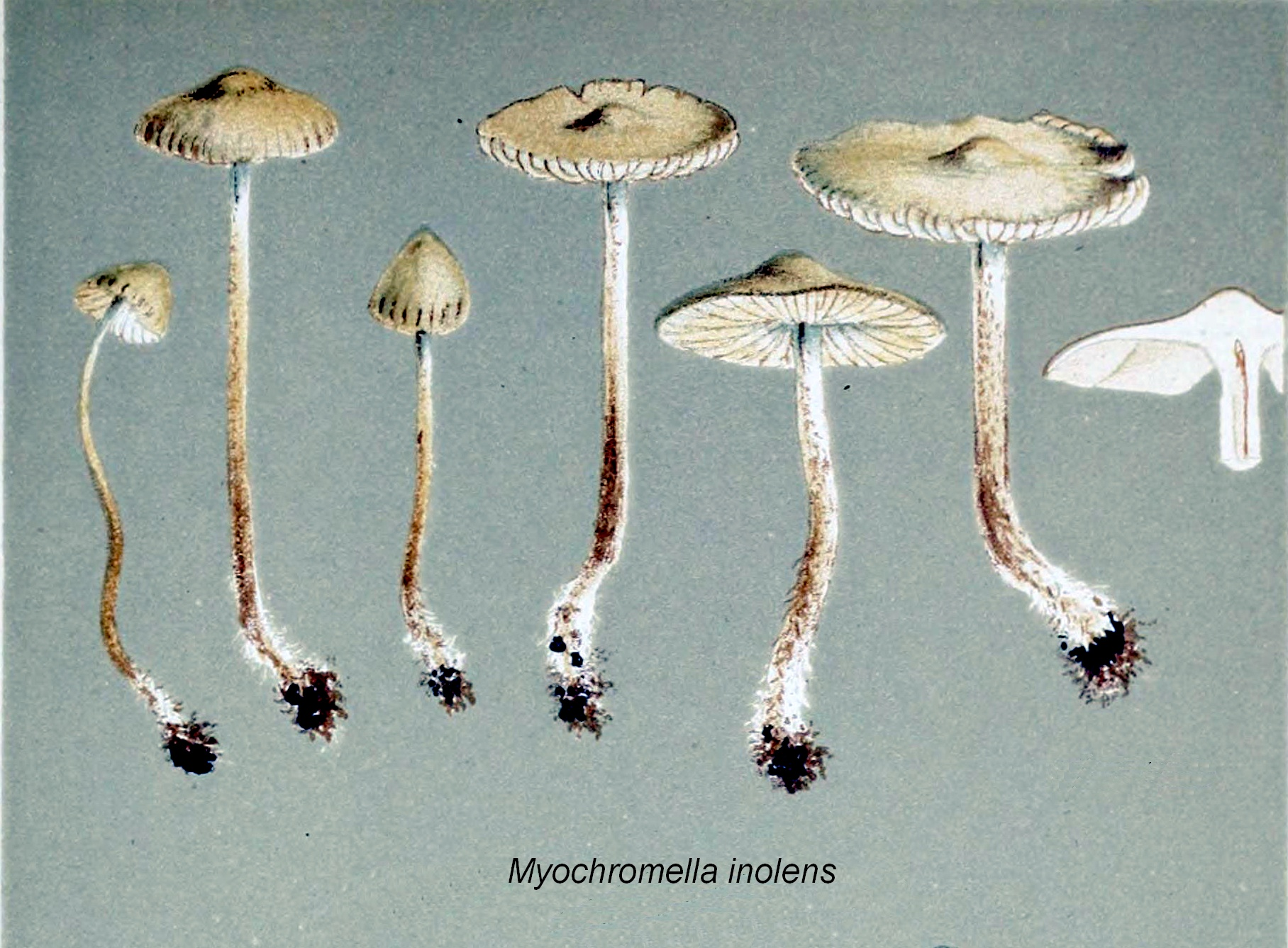
- Myochromella inolens

Scientific classification
- Kingdom: Fungi
- Division: Basidiomycota
- Class: Agaricomycetes
- Order: Agaricales
- Family: Lyophyllaceae
- Genus: Myochromella; V.Hofstetter, Clémençon, Moncalvo & Redhead (2015)

Type species
- Myochromella inolens (Fr.) V.Hofstetter, Clémençon, Moncalvo & Redhead (2015)

Species
- Myochromella boudieri; Myochromella inolens

= Myochromella =

Genus of fungi

Myochromella is a mushroom genus in the family Lyophyllaceae that has been segregated from both Lyophyllum and Tephrocybe using molecular analyses and was first informally labelled clade 'mycochromella' or section 'Tephrophana p.p.' before being recognized as a genus. The species resemble grey colored Collybias and grow in forests.

== Etymology ==
The name Myochromella is coined from Greek in reference to myo- (mouse), chromo- (color) and Latin suffix -ella (small), hence "little mouse color".

== See also ==
- List of Agaricales genera
