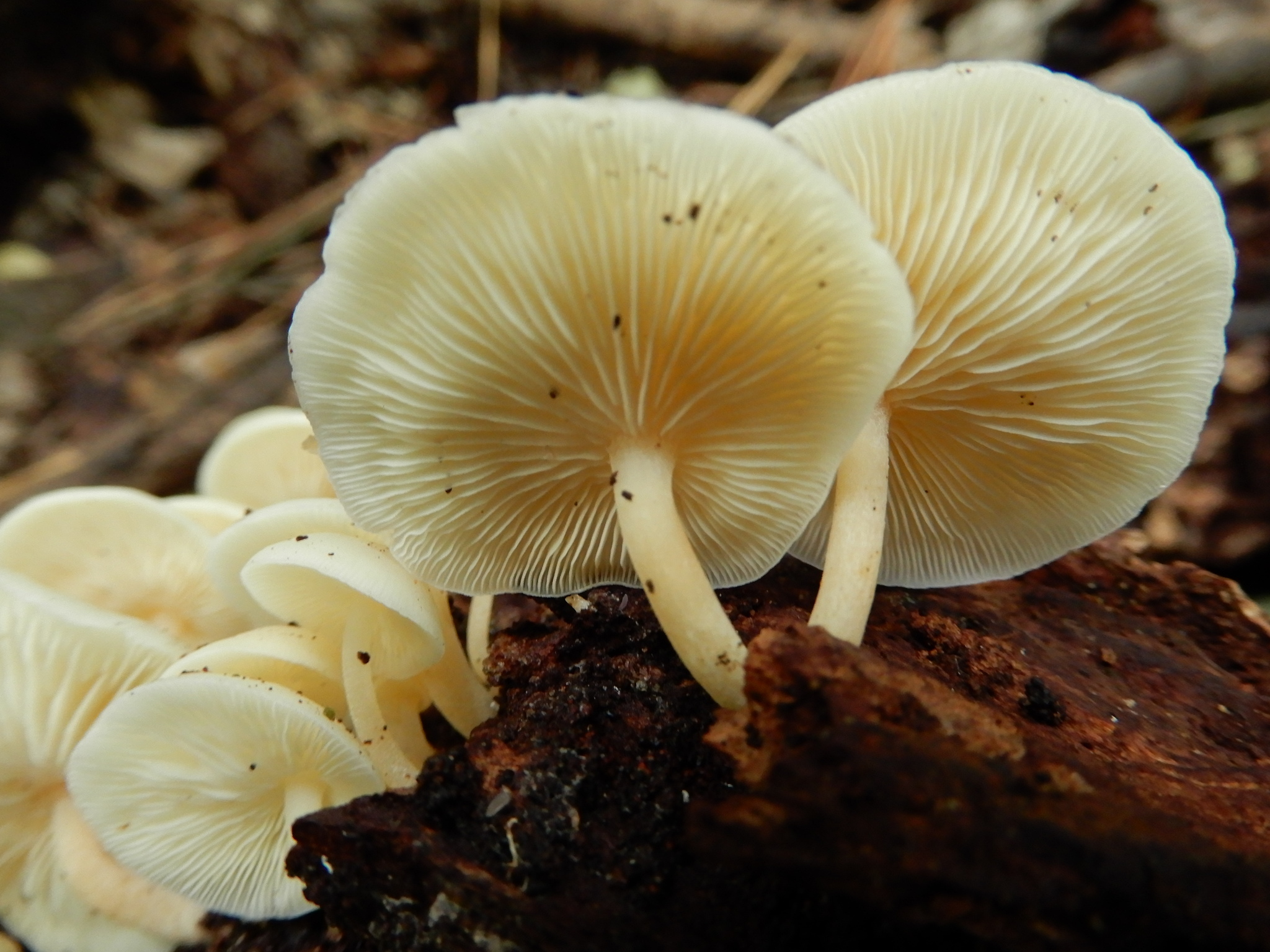

Scientific classification
- Kingdom: Fungi
- Division: Basidiomycota
- Class: Agaricomycetes
- Order: Agaricales
- Family: Lyophyllaceae
- Genus: Ossicaulis
- Species: O. semiocculta

Binomial name
- Ossicaulis semiocculta (Cleland) J.A. Cooper 2023

= Ossicaulis semiocculta =

Species of fungus

Ossicaulis semiocculta is a small wood-rotting mushroom species. It was originally described by John Burton Cleland in 1927 as Cliyocybe semiocculta. It was transferred to the genus Ossicaulis by Jerry A. Cooper in 2023.

== Description ==
Pileus 1.2 to 6.2 cm diameter, at first slightly convex with down turned edge, then sometimes expanded and upturned, often depressed over the attachment of the stem, wavy, irregular and more or less lobed at the margin, when found growing usually whitish to dingy whitish or pale buffy white (Cartridge Buff, XXX.) or creamy white and opaque, smooth, a little translucent when very moist, when gathered becoming Ochraceous Buff (XV.) round the edge and even browner in the centre, herbarium specimens drying a dingy biscuit colour. Gills adnate to sometimes slightly decurrent, close, narrow, whitish, then creamy-white. Stem short, 1.2 to 2.5 cm, central to excentric or occasionally almost lateral from the position in which it may have grown, similarly often bent, slender or rather stout, equal or slightly attenuated downwards, pruinose, tough, hollow above, the colour of the pileus. Flesh thin, equally attenuated outwards. Spores nearly subspherical, 3.5 to 4 x 2.5 to 2.8 μm, 4 μm. Sometimes caespitose (growing in dense tufts or clusters). Attached by fluffy-white mycelium to the undersides of thick sheets of fallen or stripped bark and fallen wood on the ground beneath eucalypts, or around the base of stumps, the pilei often emerging with difficulty or only found after removing overlying litter. Cleland used Ridgeway colour standard and nomenclature.

== Range ==
South-eastern Australia (NSW, Victoria, South Australia) south Western Australia and Tasmania. New Zealand.

== Habitat ==
Eucalyptus forest in Australia. In New Zealand recorded on tree ferns (Cyathea medullaris), gymnosperms (Dacrycarpus dacrydioides). monocotyledons (Cordyline australis, Cordyline indivisa, Phormium, Rhopalostylis sapida, and Ripogonum scandens), and dicotyledons (Nothofagacea).

== Ecology ==
Growing on decomposing wood. In New Zealand recorded on dead and decaying tree fern fronds, and fibrous monocotyledon leaf and stem material.

== Etymology ==
From Latin, semi, half; occult us, hidden. The specific name alludes to the frequency with which the mushrooms are often more or less hidden under bark and debris.

== Taxonomy ==
For current taxonomic relationship of the genus see Ossicaulis. As Cliyocybe semiocculta the pale colouration of the pileus, the adnate to slightly decurrent gills, the presence of clamp connections and the absence of cystidia indicate it belongs in Subgenus Clitocybe, Section Disciformes.

Molecular genetics analysis suggests that Ossicaulis is most closely related to the genera Asterophora, Hypsizygus, Lyophyllum, and Tricholomella.
