= Arthrosporella =

Scientific classification
- Kingdom: Fungi
- Division: Basidiomycota
- Class: Agaricomycetes
- Order: Agaricales
- Family: Tricholomataceae
- Genus: Arthrosporella; Singer (1970)

Type species
- Arthrosporella ditopa (Singer) Singer (1970)

Synonyms
- Armillariella ditopa Singer (1951); Nothoclavulina ditopa Singer (1970)

Genus of fungi

Arthrosporella is a fungal genus in the family Tricholomataceae. It is a monotypic genus, containing the single species Arthrosporella ditopa, found in South America. The genus was described by mycologist Rolf Singer in 1970.

Singer originally described the single species in 1950 for an agaric he and a colleague had collected in Tucumán Province, Argentina. He placed the new species in the genus Armillariella, which he considered to be the correct name of Armillaria. However, he later came to realize that the species was unusual due to being found with joint teleomorphic and anamorphic forms, both of which produced arthrospores (a type of conidiospore). Thus he erected a new genus for the species in his 1970 treatment of tribe Omphalinae for the Flora Neotropica series, also describing its anamorph as Nothoclavulina ditopa. The species and genus remain known from only the type collection, and more specifically the Nothoclavulina, the agaricoid half having been lost.

In 2005, it was announced that new species had been discovered that belonged to the genus, but further study indicated that they represented separate genera not closely related to Arthrosporella (as was first thought), and they were described in 2007 as Arthromyces and Blastosporella, the former in the Tricholomataceae, the latter in the Lyophyllaceae.

== See also ==
- List of Agaricales genera
- List of Tricholomataceae genera
