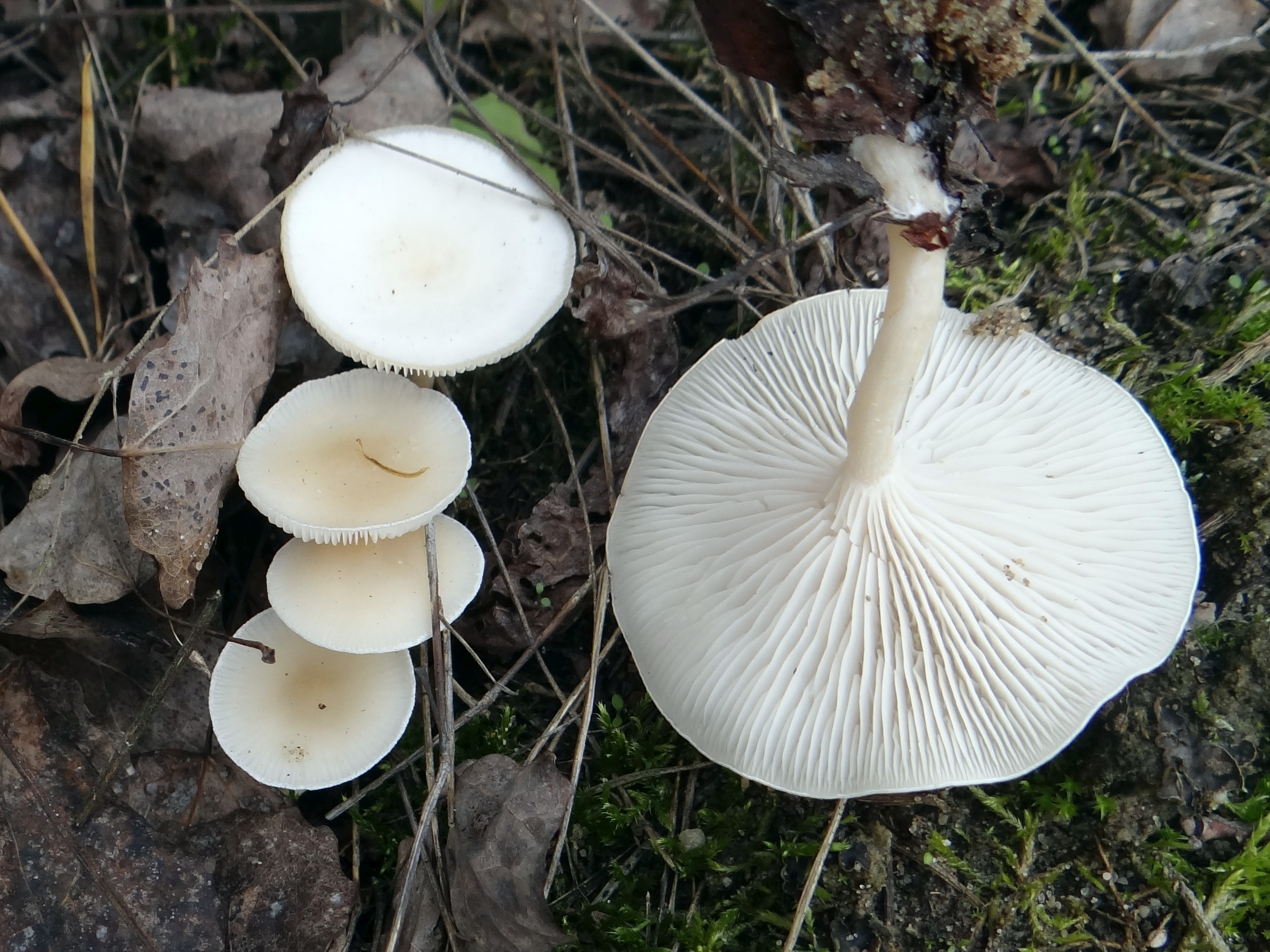
- Leucocybe candicans

Scientific classification
- Kingdom: Fungi
- Division: Basidiomycota
- Class: Agaricomycetes
- Order: Agaricales
- Family: Lyophyllaceae
- Genus: Leucocybe; Vizzini, P.Alvarado, G.Moreno, & Consiglio (2015)

Type species
- Leucocybe candicans (Pers.) Vizzini, P.Alvarado, G.Moreno, & Consiglio (2015)

= Leucocybe =

Genus of fungi

Leucocybe is a small mushroom genus, consisting of 3 named species that were formerly placed in the genus Clitocybe, which they resemble in overall appearance and morphology. They occur in woodlands growing on tree litter or disturbed ground.

== Etymology ==
The name Leucocybe is derived from Ancient Greek λευκός (leucos), referring to the color white, and κύβη (cybe), a reference to head or cap.

== Description ==
The genus was designated by DNA sequences that are unique that clade, but unique morphological features or character states that clearly distinguish it from other genera are unknown.

Fruiting bodies tend to grow in a gregarious or caespitose pattern. Individual fruiting bodies are small to medium in size (up to about 9 cm). The pileus and lamellae are white to off-white to pale pinkish in color, and hygrophanous, becoming more whitish or buff on drying or with age. The pileus shape is plano-convex to convex to globose when young, becoming plane to depressed with age. The pileus surface is glabrous, though sometimes covered with a tomentose whitish layer when young. The lamellae are adnate or slightly decurrent. The spore deposit is white.

The pileipellis hyphae are arranged as a cutis. The basidiospores are smooth, elliptic, and inamyloid. Hymenial cystidia are absent. Clamp connections are present in the hyphae. (Note: This macro- and micromorphological description is primarily based on the protologue for the genus Leucocybe given in Alvardo, et al. (2015) but with additional character states included from the protologue for L. houghtonii in Das, et al. (2017).)

== Taxonomy ==
Leucocybe, along with Atractosporocybe and Rhizocybe, is one of several genera that were segregated from Clitocybe based on molecular phylogenetic studies that found that these clades were more closely related to the families Lyophyllaceae and Entolomataceae than to Clitocybe proper. Subsequent studies have found that these genera are part of a larger clade that forms a sister group to the family Lyophyllaceae. This clade together, with the core Lyophyllaceae clade, are often designated Lyophyllaceae sensu lato in (as of 2025) current mycological literature.

== Species ==
As of 2025, the genus consists of 3 named species:

- L. candicans (Pers.) Vizzini, P. Alvarado, G. Moreno & Consiglio (2015) - formerly Clitocybe candicans.
- L. connata (Schumach.) Vizzini, P. Alvarado, G. Moreno & Consiglio (2015) - formerly Lyophyllum connatum or Clitocybe connata.
- L. houghtonii (W. Phillips) Halama & Pencak. (2017) - formerly Clitocybe houghtonii.

Leucocybe candicans is designated as the type species.

Two other species have been found to fall into the same clade as Leucocybe but have not undergone a name change from Clitocybe. The first is a species in the basal position in this clade, named in collections as C. subditopoda. However, because there were other collections also named as C. subditopoda that were found to be phylogenetically unrelated to Leucocybe or Clitocybe, renaming of this species awaits further taxonomic study to clarify the species concept and prevent misidentification of collections used in phylogenetic studies.

The other is the western North American species C. salmonilamella, which molecular phylogenetic studies have indicated falls into the Leucocybe clade, and is a sister species of the European species L. houghtonii. However, so far there has been no validly published renaming of that species as a Leucocybe.
