= C. carnea =

C. carnea may refer to:

- Caladenia carnea, a terrestrial orchid
- Calocybe carnea, a pink-capped mushroom
- Canna carnea, a garden plant
- Chromodoris carnea, a sea slug
- Chrysoperla carnea, a common lacewing
- Columbella carnea, a sea snail
- Conferva carnea, a red algae
- Corynactis carnea, a colonial anthozoan
- Cypraea carnea, a sea snail
