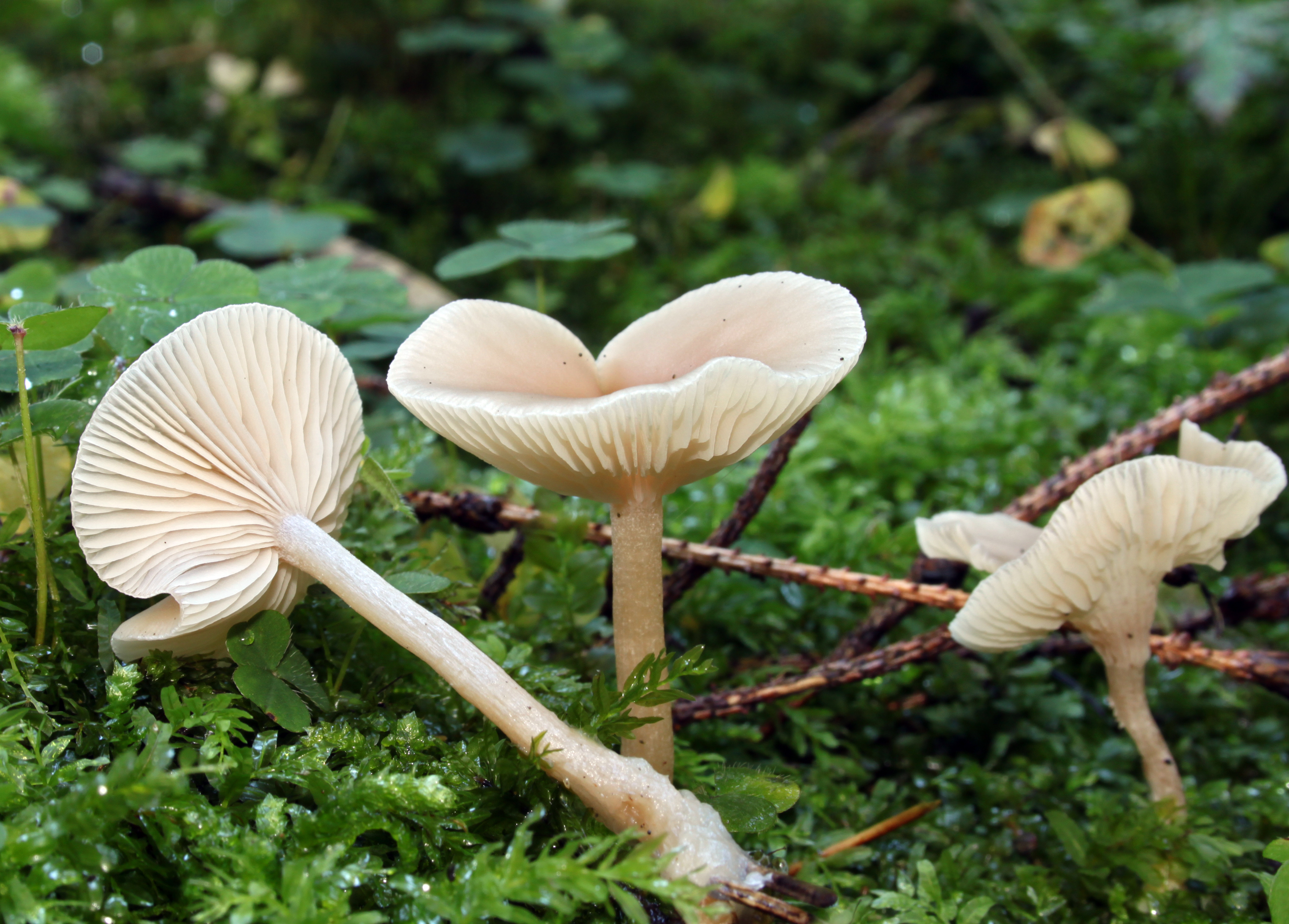

Scientific classification
- Kingdom: Fungi
- Division: Basidiomycota
- Class: Agaricomycetes
- Order: Agaricales
- Family: Clitocybaceae
- Genus: Clitocybe
- Species: C. fragrans

Binomial name
- Clitocybe fragrans (With.) P.Kumm. (1871)

Synonyms
- Agaricus fragrans With. (1792); Clitocybe deceptiva H.E.Bigelow (1982); Clitocybe depauperata (J.E.Lange) P.D.Orton (1960); Clitocybe fragrans var. depauperata J.E.Lange (1930); Lepista fragrans (With.) Harmaja (1976); Omphalia fragrans (With.) Gray (1821); Pseudolyophyllum fragrans (With.) Raithelh. (1978)

= Clitocybe fragrans =

Species of fungus

Clitocybe fragrans Mycological characteristics
- Gills on hymenium
- Cap is flat
- Hymenium is decurrent
- Stipe is bare
- Spore print is white
- Ecology is mycorrhizal
- Edibility is edible but not recommended

Clitocybe fragrans is a species of mushroom with several lookalikes, some of which are poisonous.

== Description ==
It is a white mushroom. The cap ranges from 1–5 centimetres (1/2–2 in) in diameter. The gills are somewhat close. The stem is 2–6 cm (3/4–2 3/8 in) long and 2–5 millimetres (1/16–3/16 in) wide. It has a fragrant odour resembling aniseed. The spore print is whitish.

=== Similar species ===
Within its genus, it notably resembles the deadly Clitocybe dealbata (which lacks the anise odour) and the edible Clitocybe odora (the aniseed toadstool).

Other lookalikes lacking the anise scent can be found especially in the genera Leucocybe, Rhizocybe, Singerocybe.

== Distribution and habitat ==
It can be found throughout Europe growing in broadleaf woodland, from August to December. It can also be found in North America's West Coast and Pacific Northwest regions under conifers, from October to February.

== Edibility ==
While edible, some guides caution against its consumption as it can be confused with deadly poisonous species. It can be preserved by drying.
