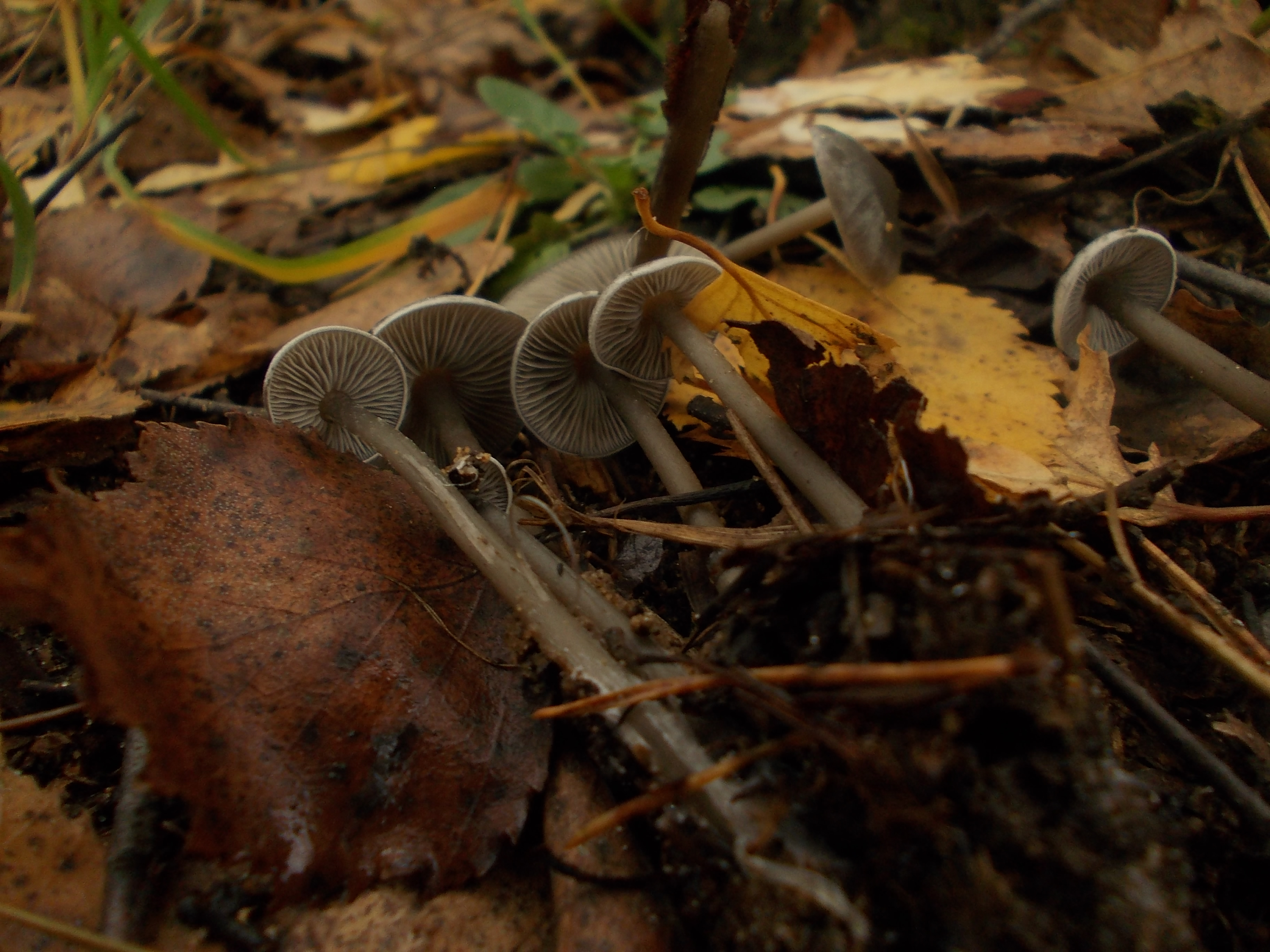

Conservation status
- Apparently Secure (NatureServe)

Scientific classification
- Kingdom: Fungi
- Division: Basidiomycota
- Class: Agaricomycetes
- Order: Agaricales
- Family: Lyophyllaceae
- Genus: Tephrocybe
- Species: T. rancida

Binomial name
- Tephrocybe rancida (Fr.) Donk 1962

Synonyms
- Agaricus rancidus Fr. 1821; Collybia rancida (Fr.) Quél. 1872; Tephrophana rancida (Fr.) Kühner 1938; Lyophyllum rancidum (Fr.) Singer 1943

= Tephrocybe rancida =

Species of fungus

Tephrocybe rancida
- Mycological characteristics
- Gills on hymenium
- Cap is convex or flat
- Hymenium is free
- Stipe is bare
- Spore print is white
- Ecology is saprotrophic
- Edibility is unknown

Tephrocybe rancida is a species of fungus in the family Lyophyllaceae. It was first described by Swedish mycologist Elias Magnus Fries in 1821. It is commonly called the rancid greyling due to its rancid smell and taste.

== Description ==
Cap 1–4 cm in diameter. Convex to flat, umbonate. Grey to brown-grey starting with a whitish bloom. Shiny when wet. Gills free, crowded, grey. Stem 4–8 cm long by 3–7 mm in diameter, concolorous with cap. Spores white or cream, ellipsoid, 7–8 × 3–4.5 m.

== Distribution and habitat ==
Found growing from the ground, solitary in deciduous woodland. Early autumn to early winter. Rare. North America and Europe.
