= T. palustris =

T. palustris may refer to:

- Tephrocybe palustris, a species of fungus in the family Lyophyllaceae which parasitizes sphagnum moss.
- Terebralia palustris, the mangrove whelk, a species of brackish-water snail in the family Potamididae.
- Thelypteris palustris, the marsh fern, native to eastern North America and across Eurasia.
- Triglochin palustris, Marsh Arrowgrass, a variety of arrowgrass found in damp grassland.
- Tetraodon palustris, a species of pufferfish in the family Tetraodontidae only found in Mekong basin.
