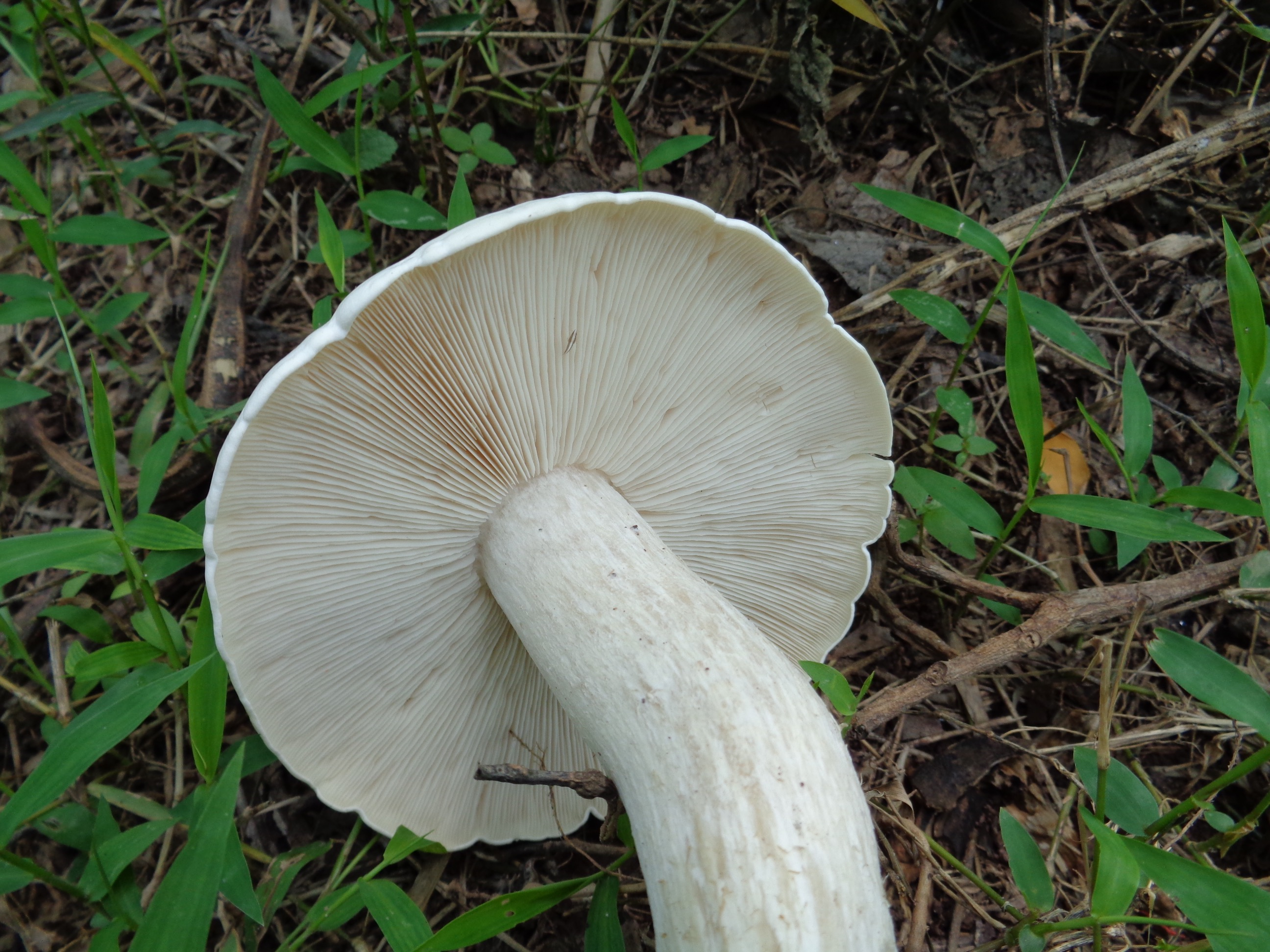

Scientific classification
- Kingdom: Fungi
- Division: Basidiomycota
- Class: Agaricomycetes
- Order: Agaricales
- Family: Lyophyllaceae
- Genus: Calocybe
- Species: C. indica

Binomial name
- Calocybe indica Purkay. & A. Chandra, 1974

= Calocybe indica =

Species of fungus

Calocybe indica, commonly known as the milky white mushroom, is a species of edible mushroom native to India. The sturdy all-white mushrooms appear in summer after rainfall in fields and on road verges. Traditionally eaten in West Bengal, it is being grown commercially in several Indian states and other tropical countries.

== Taxonomy ==
Calocybe indica was formally described in 1974, from material collected in Kolkata. The authors—botanists R.P. Purkayastha and Aindrila Chandra—had noted it to be a popular mushroom in markets in West Bengal. They placed it in the section Calocybe of the genus Calocybe, noting that it appeared closely related to and was similar morphologically to Calocybe gambosa, from which it differed by having slightly larger oval spores, and a stouter mushroom. Botanist A. S. Krishnamoorthy found it growing in Tamil Nadu in the mid-1990s, and its commercial production was overhauled and improved.

== Description ==
The robust mushroom is all-white in colour and has a firm consistency. Its cap is 10 to 14 centimetres (4 to 5 1/2 in) across, convex initially before flattening out with age. The cuticle (skin) can be easily peeled off the cap. The crowded gills are white but gradually develop into brown with age, and the cylindrical stem is 10 centimetres (4 in) high with no ring nor volva. It has a subbulbous base, being 1.8 centimetres (3/4 in) wide at the apex (top), 3.5 centimetres (1 1/2 in) in the middle and 2.4 centimetres (1 in) wide at the base. The mushroom does not change colour on cutting or bruising, though old dried specimens have a buff colour. The flesh has a mild flavour that has been described as oily, and a faint smell reminiscent of radishes. The spore print is white, and the oval spores measure 5.9–6.8 μm long by 4.2–5.1 μm wide.

== Distribution, habitat and ecology ==
Calocybe indica grows in grasslands, fields and road verges in Tamil Nadu and Rajasthan, generally on a substrate that is rich in organic material. The mushrooms appear between May and August after spells of rainfall. The fungus is saprophytic, though it has been reported to form ectomycorrhizal relationships with the roots of the coconut tree (Cocos nucifera), palmyra palm (Borassus flabellifer), tamarind (Tamarindus indica) and yellow poinciana (Peltophorum pterocarpum).

== Cultivation ==
Calocybe indica is cultivated commercially in southern India and becoming more popular in China, Malaysia, and Singapore; it can be grown in hot humid (60% to 70%) countries with a temperature range of 25 to 35 °C year-round.
