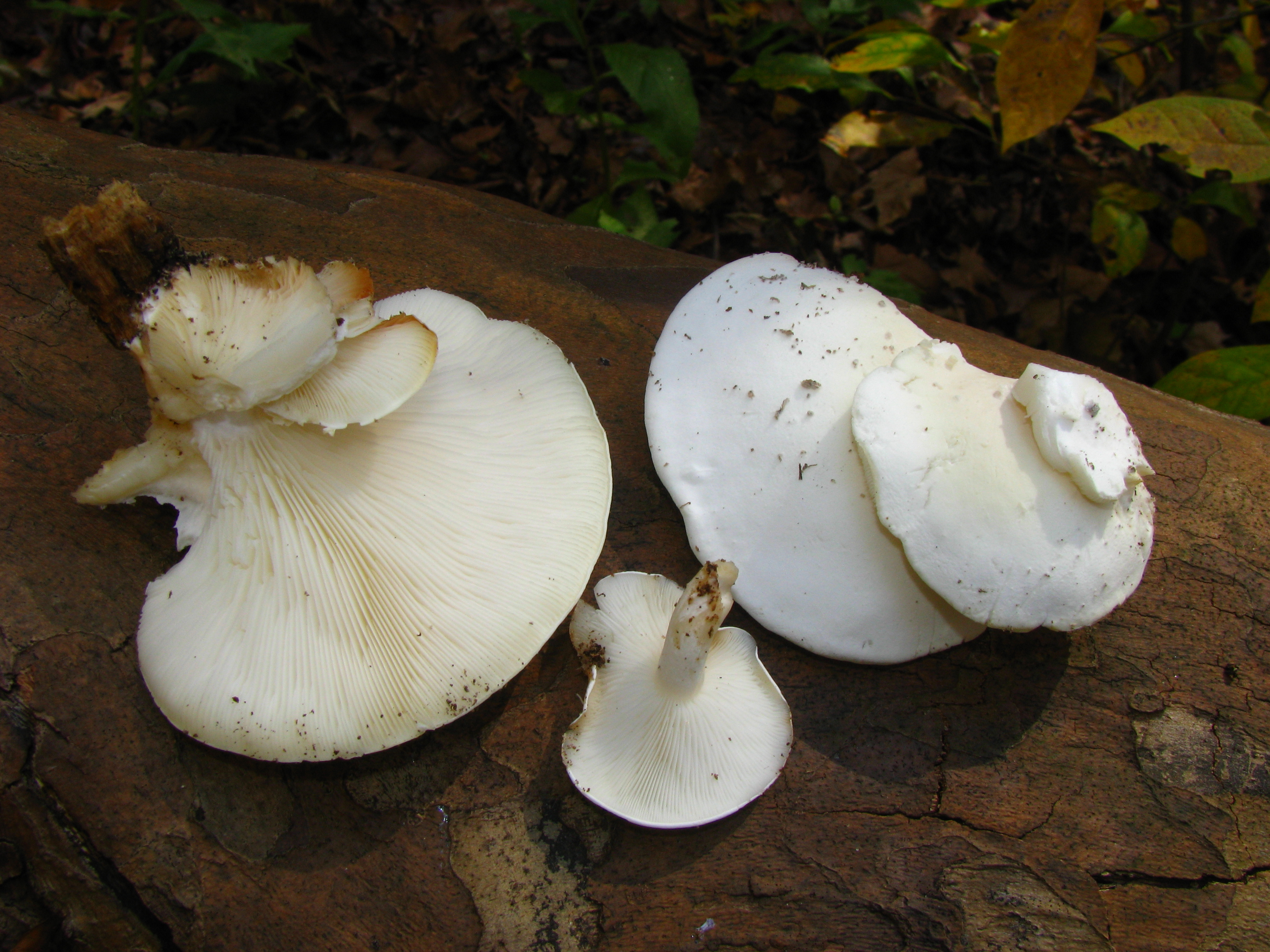
- Ossicaulis lignatilis

Scientific classification
- Kingdom: Fungi
- Division: Basidiomycota
- Class: Agaricomycetes
- Order: Agaricales
- Family: Lyophyllaceae
- Genus: Ossicaulis; Redhead & Ginns (1985)

Type species
- Ossicaulis lignatilis (Pers.) Redhead & Ginns (1985)

Species
- O. borealis O. lignatilis O. salomii O. semiocculta O. sichuanensis O. yunnanensis

= Ossicaulis =

Genus of fungi

Ossicaulis is a genus of mushroom-forming fungi in the family Lyophyllaceae.

== Taxonomy ==
The genus was circumscribed in 1985 to contain the species originally described as Agaricus lignatilis by Christian Hendrik Persoon in 1801. This was considered the sole species in the genus until 2007, when Marco Contu validly published a description of O. lachnopus from collections in Italy. Genetic analyses published in 2013 confirm that O. lachnopus and O. lignatilis should be considered distinct species. Molecular genetics analysis suggests that Ossicaulis is most closely related to the genera Asterophora, Hypsizygus, Lyophyllum, and Tricholomella.

== Description ==
Ossicaulis species have gills that are adnexed, adnate or somewhat decurrent and a stipe that is centrally or laterally attached to the cap. The hyphal system is monomitic (meaning only generative hyphae are present), the trama is regular, and there are clamp connections in the hyphae. Spores are small and ellipsoidal in shape. The cap cuticle features coral-shaped (coralloid) hyphae, and there are additionally coralloid to narrowly club-shaped cheilocystidia in the hymenium. The two species are similar in most macroscopic characteristics, but they can be reliably differentiated by differences in spore width: O. lachnopus is 2.8–4.0 by 2.0–2.4 μm, while the dimensions of O. lignatilis spores are 4.0–5.6 by 2.4–3.2 μm.

== Habitat and distribution ==
Both species are widespread throughout Europe; O. lignatilis is also found in North America. O. lachnopus tends to grow in natural forested habitats, while O. lignatilis prefers habitats that are man-made or have been influenced by man, like towns, villages, parks, and avenues. Both species grow on dead and decaying wood of deciduous (rarely coniferous) trees.

== Species ==
As of January 2025, Species Fungorum (in the Catalogue of Life) accepts six species of Ossicaulis:

- Ossicaulis borealis X.D.Yu & H.B.Guo (2023)
- Ossicaulis lignatilis (Pers.) Redhead & Ginns (1985)
- Ossicaulis salomii Siquier & Bellanger (2019)
- Ossicaulis semiocculta (Cleland) J.A.Cooper (2023)
- Ossicaulis sichuanensis S.W.Wei, Q.Wang & Yu Li bis (2023)
- Ossicaulis yunnanensis L.P.Tang, N.K.Zeng & S.D.Yang (2017)
