= Ossicaulis lignatilis =

Scientific classification
- Kingdom: Fungi
- Division: Basidiomycota
- Class: Agaricomycetes
- Order: Agaricales
- Family: Lyophyllaceae
- Genus: Ossicaulis
- Species: O. lignatilis

Binomial name
- Ossicaulis lignatilis (Pers.) Redhead & Ginns (1985)

Synonyms
- Agaricus lignatilis Pers. (1801); Gymnopus lignatilis Pers. (1835); Pleurotus lignatilis (Pers.) P. Kumm. (1871); Clitocybe lignatilis (Pers.) P. Karst. (1879); Omphalina lignatilis (Pers.) Quél. (1902); Pleurocybella lignatilis (Pers.) Singer (1947); Nothopanus lignatilis (Pers.) Bon (1986)

Species of fungus

Ossicaulis lignatilis, commonly known as the bonestem, is a species of mushroom in the family Lyophyllaceae.

== Description ==
The cap of Ossicaulis lignatilis is whitish in color when young, and it develops rusty to yellowish-colored stains in age. It is about 3-10 centimeters in diameter. When young, it is convex to round, and it becomes flat in age. The stipe is whitish in color and has a fibrous texture. It is about 1.5-4 centimeters long and 1.5-6 millimeters wide. The gills can be adnexed, adnate, or slightly decurrent, and are white in color, though they dry yellow. The scent is farinaceous to fungal, and the spore print is white.

=== Similar species ===
Ossicaulis lignatilis
- Mycological characteristics
- Gills on hymenium
- Cap is convex or flat
- Hymenium is adnexed or adnate
- Stipe is bare
- Spore print is white
- Ecology is saprotrophic
- Edibility is unknown

Ossicaulis lignatilis can be confused with Pleurotus and Clitocybe species. However, Clitocybe have different textures and typically grow on the ground, while Pleurotus have less symmetrical caps, a more fleshy texture, and more decurrent gills. The stipe is also typically less well defined.

== Habitat and distribution ==
Ossicaulis lignatilis is found on rotting hardwoods, including elm, beech, cottonwood, and maple. It occasionally grows on conifers as well. It is found in many parts of Europe. It is also found in Japan, eastern North America, the Pacific Northwest, and California.
