= Lyophyllum eucalypticum =

Scientific classification
- Domain: Eukaryota
- Kingdom: Fungi
- Division: Basidiomycota
- Class: Agaricomycetes
- Order: Agaricales
- Family: Lyophyllaceae
- Genus: Lyophyllum
- Species: L. eucalypticum

Binomial name
- Lyophyllum eucalypticum (A.Pearson) M.M.Moser (1986)

Synonyms
- Tricholoma eucalypticum A.Pearson (1951); Tricholoma eucalypticum var. alboflavescens Lago-Álv. & M.L.Castro (2004)

Species of fungus

Lyophyllum eucalypticum is a species of fungus in the family Lyophyllaceae. Found in Australia, it was first described as a species of Tricholoma by English mycologist Arthur Anselm Pearson in 1951. Meinhard Michael Moser transferred it to Lyophyllum in 1986. This white, wooly tropical mushroom is similar to other mushroom species, such as Macrofungus that looks similar but only grows in Australia. The distinguishing features are its deep purple borders, which are typically trimmed with black rings. It has wide wings that spread out as the mushroom matures.
