= Leucocybe connata =

Scientific classification
- Kingdom: Fungi
- Division: Basidiomycota
- Class: Agaricomycetes
- Order: Agaricales
- Family: Lyophyllaceae
- Genus: Leucocybe
- Species: L. connata

Binomial name
- Leucocybe connata (Schumach.) Vizzini et al. (2015)

Synonyms
- Agaricus connatus Schumach. (1803); Clitocybe connata Schumach. (1874); Gyrophila connata Schumach. (1886); Omphalia connata Schumach. (1888); Clitocybe rivulosa var. connata (Schumach.) Constantin & L.M. Dufour (1891); Tricholoma connatum (Schumach.) Ricken (1914); Lyophyllum connatum (Schumach.) Singer (1939)

Species of fungus

Leucocybe connata
- Mycological characteristics
- Gills on hymenium
- Cap is convex
- Hymenium is adnexed
- Stipe is bare
- Spore print is white
- Ecology is saprotrophic
- Edibility is not recommended

Leucocybe connata, commonly known as the tufted paledome or white domecap, is a species of mushroom in the family Lyophyllaceae. It grows in clusters on the ground and is not recommended for consumption.

== Taxonomy ==
Leucocybe connata was first described by Heinrich Christian Friedrich Schumacher in 1803 as Agaricus connatus. During the 19th and 20th centuries, it was shuffled between various genera including Clitocybe and Tricholoma, eventually being transferred to the genus Lyophyllum by Rolf Singer in 1939. In 2015, it was transferred to the genus Leucocybe.

== Description ==
The cap of Leucocybe connata is white in color, and has a smooth to powdery texture. It can become beige in age. It is about 2-8 centimeters in diameter. It is round to broadly convex. The stipe is white and about 4-10 centimeters long and 0.5-1 centimeters wide. The apex is smooth to slightly fibrillose, and the base is bulbous. The gills are white and adnexed to slightly decurrent. The spore print is white. The mushroom usually grows in clusters.

=== Similar species ===
Leucocybe connata can be confused with Clitocybe sclerotoidea, but that species is smaller and grayer. It is also a parasite to Helvella species. Leucocybe candicans is also similar, but it typically grows alone rather than in clusters. Collybia rivulosa is also similar, but it is smaller, usually has blotches on its cap, and typically grows in disturbed areas.

== Habitat and distribution ==
Leucocybe connata is found in forests. It is saprophytic and grows in leaf litter. It grows in Europe and the Pacific Northwest.

== Toxixity ==
Leucocybe connata is not recommended for consumption. It has historically been confused with the poisonous Clitocybe dilatata, but it has been proven to be distinct. One study revealed L. connata to contain carcinogenic or mutation-causing compounds.
