= Feathercamp =

Wildland in Washington County, Virginia

- Location within Virginia
- Location: Washington County, Virginia, United States
- Coordinates: 36°39′6″N 81°44′50″W
- Area: 6,719 acres (27.19 km^{2})

Feathercamp is a wildland in the George Washington and Jefferson National Forests of western Virginia that has been recognized by the Wilderness Society as a special place worthy of protection from logging and road construction. The Wilderness Society has designated the area as a "Mountain Treasure".

One of the largest interior spaces in the Mount Rogers National Recreation area, Feathercamp offers a more primitive recreation than the Mount Rogers High Country. Trails include the Appalachian Trail, the Iron Mountain Trail and Feathercamp Branch.

The area is part of the Mount Rogers Cluster.

== Location and access ==
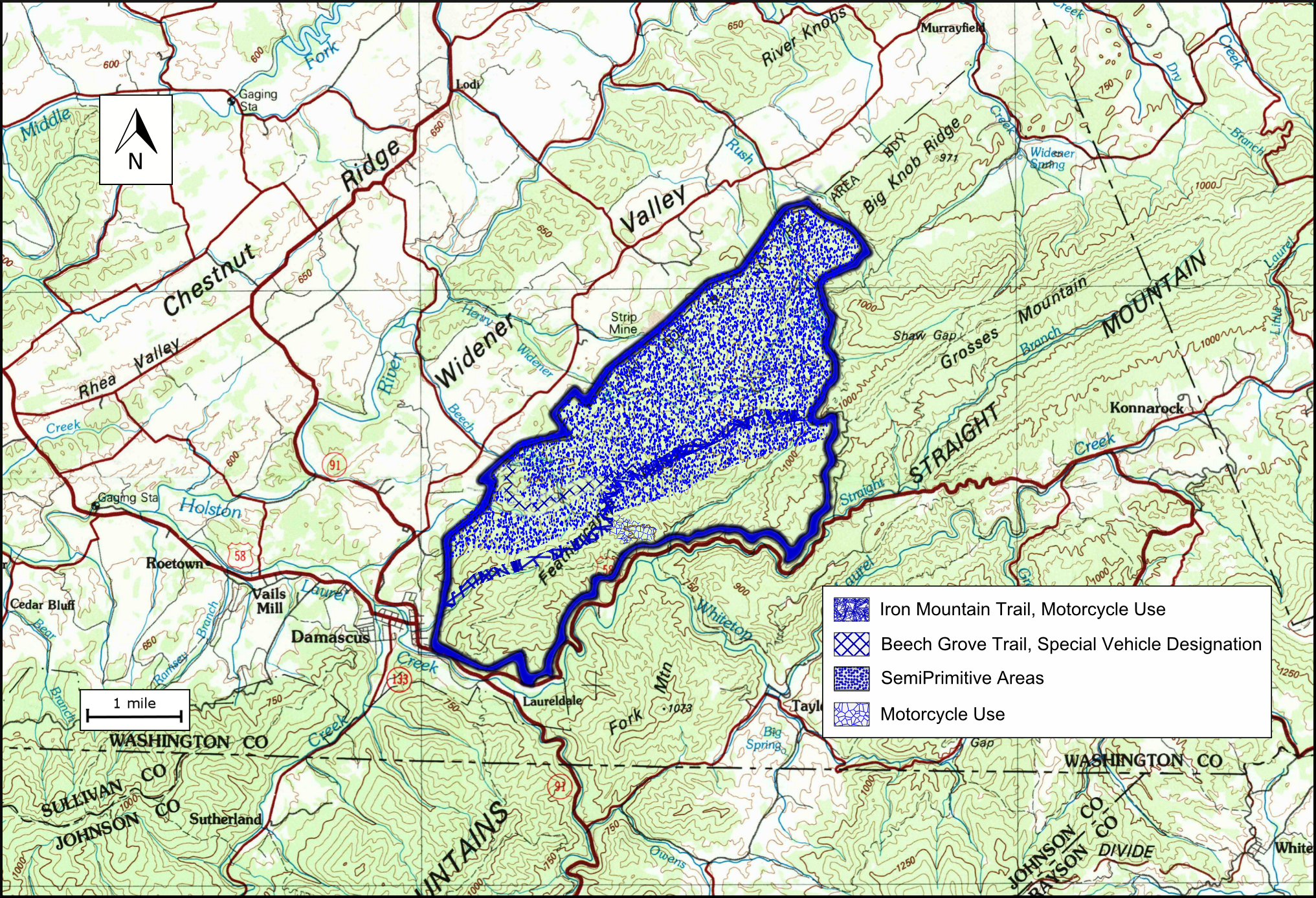
Boundary of the Feathercamp wild area as identified by the Wilderness Society.

The area is located in the Appalachian Mountains of Southwestern Virginia about 2.4 miles northeast of Damascus, Virginia between USFS Rd 90 on the east, US 58 on the south, and Va 605 on the west. It lies on the southwest side of the Shaw Gap wild area. The Appalachian Trail extends for 4.6 miles through the area, entering from US 58 on the east, climbing to Feathercamp Ridge and then exiting to US 58 on the south.

Other trails into the area include:

- Beech Grove, FS 4552, 3.7 miles, moderate, yellow diamond blaze, hiking, mountain biking horses, motorcycles
- Buzzard Den, FS 4582, 1.6 miles, difficult, yellow triangle blaze, hiking, mountain biking, horses
- Clark Mountain Trail, FS 4549, 2.4 miles, decommissioned
- Feather Camp, FS 169, 3.3 miles, moderate, blue blazed, hiking
- Feather Camp Ridge Trail, FS 4550, 0.58 miles, hiking, mountain biking
- Iron Mountain, FS 301, 0.1 miles, easy, blue blaze, hiking, mountain biking, horses, motorcycles
- Iron Mountain Spur, FS 4640, 0.1 miles, easy, blue blaze, hiking, mountain biking, horses, motorcycles
- Sawmill, FS 4548, 2.8, moderate, yellow diamond, hiking, mountain biking, horses
- Wright Hollow, FS 4558, 3.0 miles, difficult, yellow square blaze, hiking, mountain biking

Several roads provide access to the area, some open seasonally. These include Beech Grove Road (Rt 49510), Feathercamp Rd. (Rt. 90), Buzzards Den Rd. (Rt. 835), Sturgill Rd (Rt. 615), and Cuckoo Rd (Rt. 4038). The forest service vehicle use map shows that the Cuckoo Rd. may be closed.

The boundary of the wildland as determined by the Wilderness Society is shown in the adjacent map. Additional roads and trails are given on National Geographic Maps 786 (Mount Rogers). and Map 318 (Mount Rogers High Country) A great variety of information, including topographic maps, aerial views, satellite data and weather information, is obtained by selecting the link with the wild land's coordinates in the upper right of this page.

Beyond maintained trails, old logging roads can be used to explore the area. The Appalachian Mountains were extensively timbered in the early twentieth century leaving logging roads that are becoming overgrown but still passable. Old logging roads and railroad grades can be located by consulting the historical topographic maps available from the United States Geological Survey (USGS). The Feathercamp wild area is covered by USGS topographic maps Konnarock and Damascus.

== Natural history ==
Old growth forest have been identified near Cuckoo Knob and on Feathercamp Ridge. The area contains coves in which leaf rot has accumulated that supports an array of mushrooms—the chanterelle, Caesar, yellow and violet corals, and milky white.

Two streams in the area, Rush Creek and Feathercamp Branch, are recognized for their water quality. Wild natural trout streams in Virginia are classified by the Department of Game and Inland Fisheries by their water quality, with class i the highest and class iv the lowest. Rush Creek and Feathercamp Branch are class ii streams.

== Topography ==
As part of the Southern Blue Ridge Mountains Subsection within the Central Appalachian Broadleaf Coniferous Forest-Meadow Province, there are tectonic uplifted mountain ranges composed of igneous and metamorphic rock with many high gradient, deeply incised streams. Feathercamp Ridge (3274 feet), Cuckoo Knob, highpoint on the southern end of the ridge, and Clark mountain (3041 feet) are dominant peaks.

== Forest Service management ==
The Forest Service has conducted a survey of their lands to determine the potential for wilderness designation. Wilderness designation provides a high degree of protection from development. The areas that were found suitable are referred to as inventoried roadless areas. Later a Roadless Rule was adopted that limited road construction in these areas. The rule provided some degree of protection by reducing the negative environmental impact of road construction and thus promoting the conservation of roadless areas. Feathercamp was not inventoried in the roadless area review, and therefore not protected from possible road construction and timber sales.

The forest service classifies areas under their management by a recreational opportunity setting that informs visitors of the diverse range of opportunities available in the forest. Areas in Feathercamp include "semi-primitive motorized" around the Iron Mountain Trail, "semi-primitive-2" on the north and south, "dispersed recreation – suitable", and "backcountry – few roads" in the center, as well as the Appalachian Trail corridor and part of the Whitetop Laurel Special Area.
