= Gerhardtia =

Scientific classification
- Kingdom: Fungi
- Division: Basidiomycota
- Class: Agaricomycetes
- Order: Agaricales
- Family: Lyophyllaceae
- Genus: Gerhardtia; Bon (1994)

Type species
- Gerhardtia incarnatobrunnea (Ew.Gerhardt) Bon (1994)

Synonyms
- G. borealis G. highlandensis G. incarnatobrunnea G. leucopaxilloides G. marasmioides G. piperata G. pseudosaponacea G. pudica G. suburens

Genus of fungi

Gerhardtia is a genus of fungi in the family Lyophyllaceae. It was circumscribed in 1994 by French mycologist Marcel Bon, with Gerhardtia incarnatobrunnea as the type species. It is distinguished from similar genera by having spores with an irregular outline. Some authorities place Gerhardtia in synonymy with Lyophyllum. The New Zealand species Gerhardtia pseudosaponacea, described as new to science in 2014, is similar in appearance to Tricholoma saponaceum, including its weakly soap-like odor.
