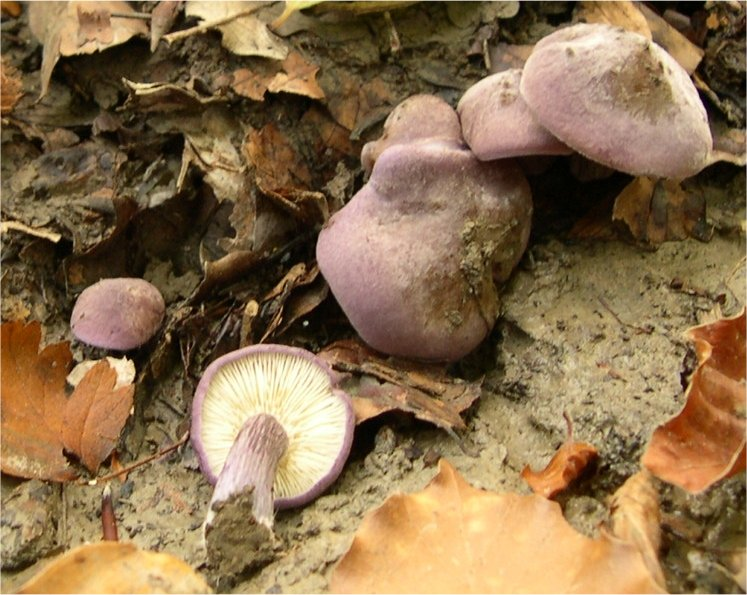

Scientific classification
- Domain: Eukaryota
- Kingdom: Fungi
- Division: Basidiomycota
- Class: Agaricomycetes
- Order: Agaricales
- Family: Lyophyllaceae
- Genus: Calocybe
- Species: C. ionides

Binomial name
- Calocybe ionides (Bulliard) Donk, 1962

= Calocybe ionides =

Species of fungus

Calocybe ionides is a species of fungus belonging to the family Lyophyllaceae.

It is native to Europe and Northern America, Japan.
