= Sagaranella =

Scientific classification
- Kingdom: Fungi
- Division: Basidiomycota
- Class: Agaricomycetes
- Order: Agaricales
- Family: Lyophyllaceae
- Genus: Sagaranella; V.Hofstetter, Clémençon, Moncalvo & Redhead (2015)

Type species
- Sagaranella tylicolor (Fr.) V.Hofstetter, Clémençon, Moncalvo & Redhead (2015)

Species
- Sagaranella erosa Sagaranella gibberosa Sagaranella tesquorum Sagaranella tylicolor

Genus of fungi

Sagaranella is a mushroom genus in the family Lyophyllaceae that has been segregated from both Lyophyllum and Tephrocybe using molecular analyses. The species resemble grey colored Collybias and grow in nitrogen-rich environments.

== Etymology ==
The name Sagaranella honours Professor Naohiko Sagara, a Japanese mycologist who has extensively studied ammonia fungi such as this genus.

== See also ==
- List of Agaricales genera
