= Lyophyllum konradianum =

Scientific classification
- Domain: Eukaryota
- Kingdom: Fungi
- Division: Basidiomycota
- Class: Agaricomycetes
- Order: Agaricales
- Family: Lyophyllaceae
- Genus: Lyophyllum
- Species: L. konradianum

Binomial name
- Lyophyllum konradianum (Maire) Kühner & Romagn., Encyclop. Mycol. (Paris) 14(1): 368 (1948)

Species of fungus

Lyophyllum konradium is a species of mushroom-forming fungus in the family Lyophyllaceae.

== Morphology ==
Lyophyllum konradium is distinguished from other members of Lyophyllum by the presence of well-differentiated hymenial cystidia.

== Molecular phylogenetics ==
While the species has been treated as a member of the polyphyletic genus Lyophyllum, molecular phylogenies have placed L. konradium in a distant clade from other members of the genus. This phylogenetic isolation has led some authors to recommend the creation of a new genus, which would include L. konradium and three additional unidentified species that placed near L. konradium in the most recent phylogenetic analysis by Bellanger et al. (2015).
