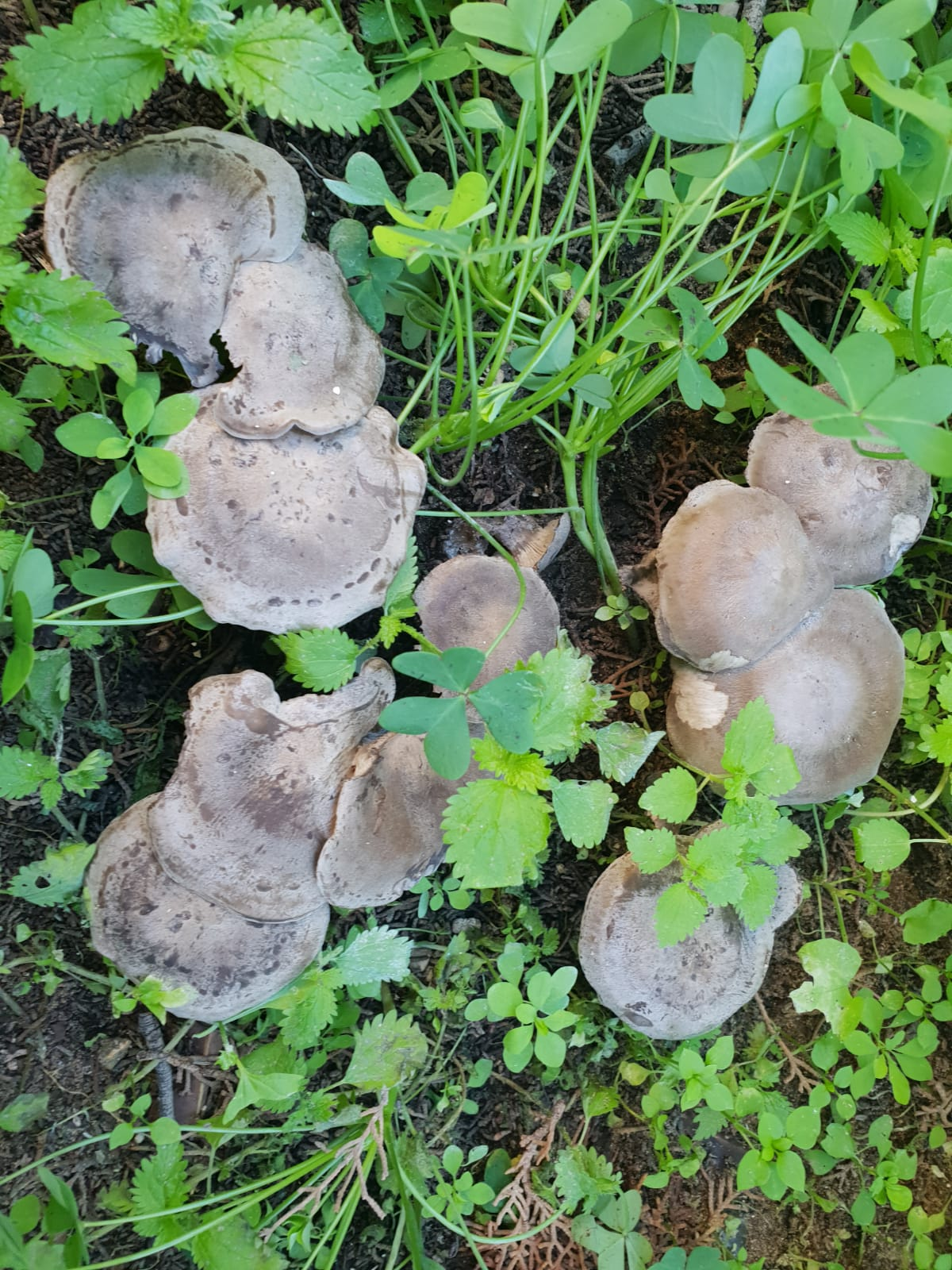

Scientific classification
- Domain: Eukaryota
- Kingdom: Fungi
- Division: Basidiomycota
- Class: Agaricomycetes
- Order: Agaricales
- Family: Lyophyllaceae
- Genus: Lyophyllum
- Species: L. littoralis

Binomial name
- Lyophyllum littoralis (Ballero & Contu) Contu

= Lyophyllum littoralis =

Species of mushroom

Lyophyllum littoralis Mycological characteristics
- Gills on hymenium
- Cap is depressed
- Hymenium is adnate
- Stipe is bare
- Spore print is white
- Edibility is edible

Lyophyllum littoralis, is a grey edible mushroom of the genus Lyophyllum. It is closely related to Lyophyllum decastes. It is hot climate fungus species common in Mediterranean coniferous woodlands. Often growing in clusters.

== Taxonomy ==
Lyophyllum littoralis was first described as a separate species in 1998 by Italian mycologist Marco Contu.

== Description ==
The smooth cap is 5–15 cm (2–6 in) wide mottled grey to brownish grey colour, with darker splotches tending to be around the edge. Often covered in a whitish powder. Cap shape in younger specimen tends to be round and becomes convoluted with age, with the cap edge pointing downwards.

The stipe is 1.5–4 cm (0.6–1.6 in) high and up to 0.4-1.5 cm wide and has no ring nor volva. Often hollow the stipe ranges from white at the top to grey at the bottom with older specimen being grey

The gills are white tending to pale yellow-grey in older specimen. the gills densely packed, can be free (unattached to the stipe) or slightly sliding to the stipe.

The flesh is thin and rubbery, and does not break easily, especially the stipe. Older specimen (especially after sporulation) exude a distinct coconut scent. Younger specimen have no discernible scent or taste prior to cooking.

White spore in bulk. Spores 4.5-5.5 (6) × 4.5-5.5 μm, globular, smooth, cyanophile, often with central guttula. Tetrasporic, trivial basidia. GAF present in all tissues.

== Distribution and habitat ==
Lyophyllum littoralis is found in Mediterranean woodlands, where fruiting bodies appear under conifers, particularly pine, from November to January. They generally appear in clumps connected to the same base, but can also appear individually.

== Edibility ==
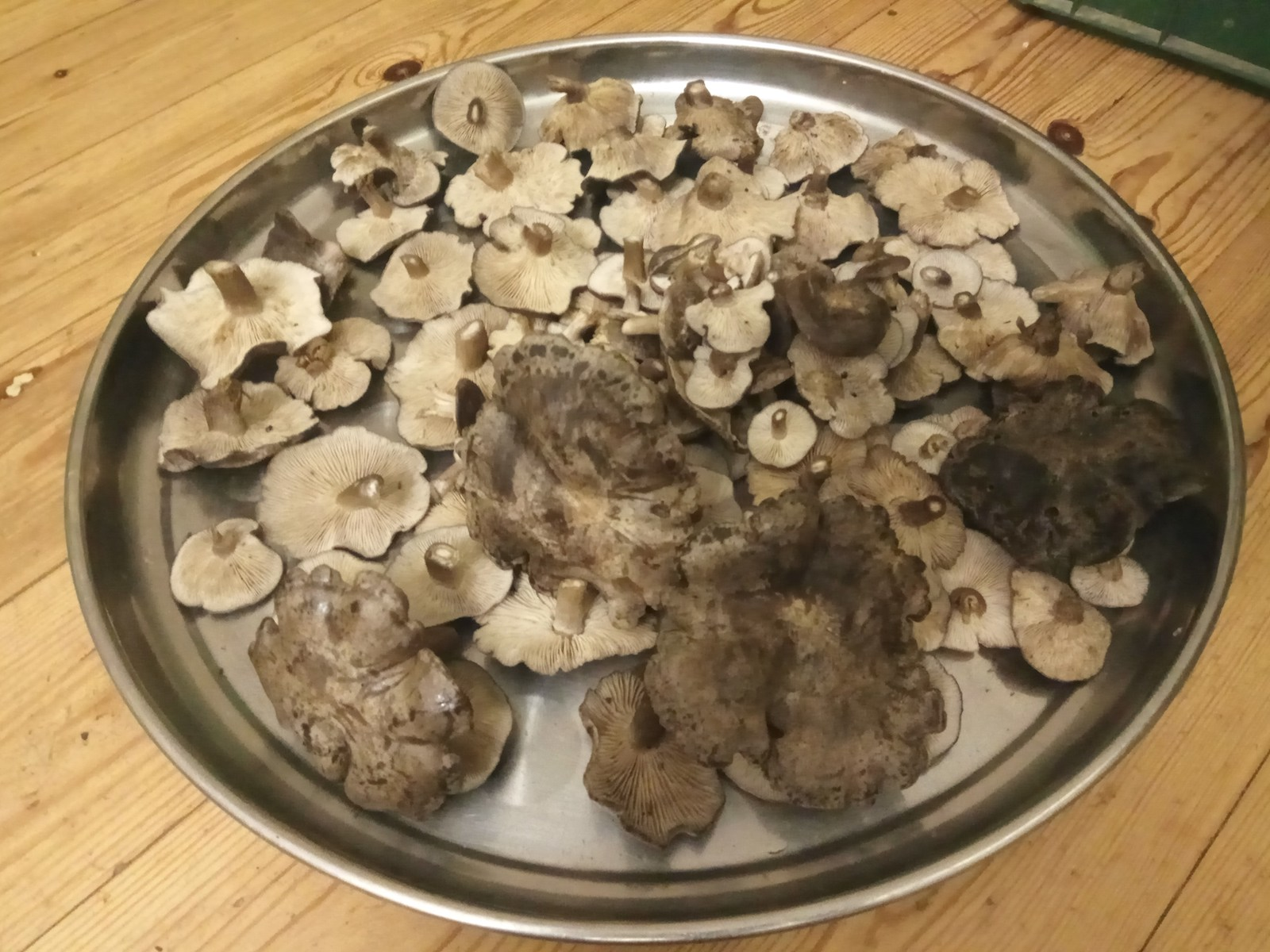
Collected Lyophyllum littoralis mushrooms of various ages

With a taste reminiscent of fried chicken and texture that retains its firmness after frying, the species is a good edible.
