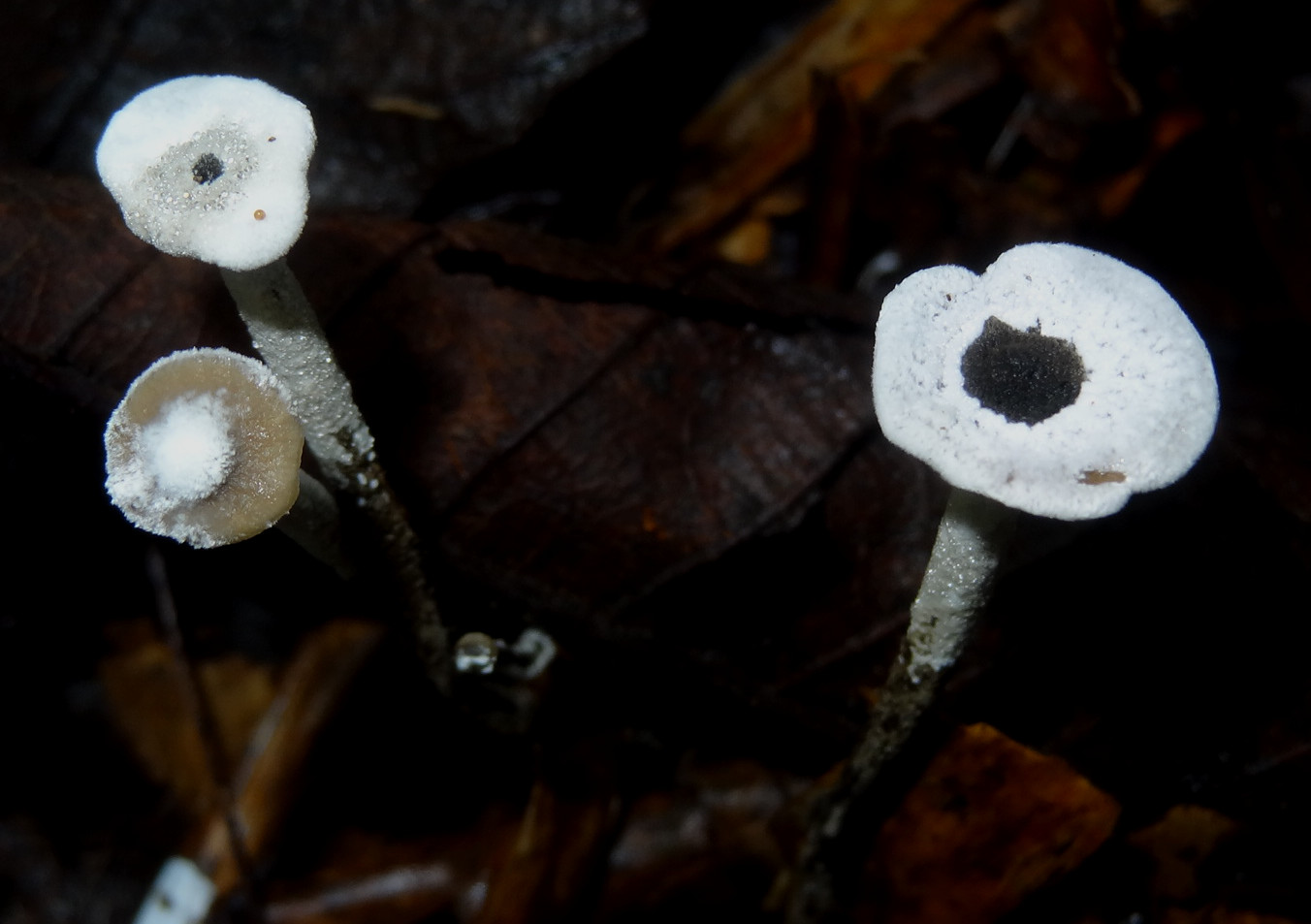
- Arthromyces claviformis, T.J. Baroni & Lodge 733469

Scientific classification
- Kingdom: Fungi
- Division: Basidiomycota
- Class: Agaricomycetes
- Order: Agaricales
- Family: Lyophyllaceae
- Genus: Arthromyces; T.J. Baroni & Lodge

Type species
- Arthromyces claviformis T.J. Baroni & Lodge

Species
- A. claviformis A. matolae

= Arthromyces =

Genus of fungi

Arthromyces is a genus of fungi in the Lyophyllaceae family. The genus contain two species found in Central America.

== See also ==
- Arthrosporella
- Blastosporella
