= Nothoclavulina =

Scientific classification
- Kingdom: Fungi
- Division: Basidiomycota
- Class: Agaricomycetes
- Order: Agaricales
- Family: Tricholomataceae
- Genus: Nothoclavulina; Singer

Type species
- Nothoclavulina ditopa Singer
- The type location Tucumán Province shown in green

Genus of fungi

Nothoclavulina is a genus of fungus in the family Tricholomataceae. The genus is monotypic, containing the single species Nothoclavulina ditopa, described by American mycologist Rolf Singer in 1970. The species, found in Argentina, is an anamorphic version of the genus Arthrosporella. The generic name Nothoclavulina is Latin for "false Clavulina".

== Description ==
The fungus white sporocarps measure 5–25 mm (0.2–1.0 in) by 1–2.5 mm (0.04–0.10 in), and have a central strand of filamentous hyphae. The surface is pulverulent—as if covered with a fine white powder. There are no basidia, basidiospores, nor clamp connections present in the hyphae. The fungus produces arthrospores, specialized uninucleate cells that function like a spore and formed vegetatively. The arthrospores have thin walls, and are hyaline (translucent) and smooth. The fungus is the anamorph (asexual stage) of the species Arthrosporella ditopa; the arthroconidia are produced directly on the stem of that species to give it a powdery appearance.

== Habitat and distribution ==
The fungus was found by Rolf Singer in the late autumn of 1949, growing on rotting leaves and humus in subtropical forests dominated by Myrtaceae species, in the northwestern province of Tucumán in Argentina. Found at an altitude 1,000 to 1,100 m (3,300 to 3,600 ft), nearby plants in the area were from several genera, including Boehmeria, Duranta, Eugenia, Phoebe, and Piptadenia.

== See also ==
- List of Tricholomataceae genera
