= Lyophyllopsis =

Scientific classification
- Kingdom: Fungi
- Division: Basidiomycota
- Class: Agaricomycetes
- Order: Agaricales
- Family: Lyophyllaceae
- Genus: Lyophyllopsis; Sathe & J.T. Daniel

Type species
- Lyophyllopsis keralensis Sathe & J.T. Daniel

Genus of fungi

Lyophyllum is a genus of fungus in the Lyophyllaceae family. The genus is monotypic, containing the single species Lyophyllopsis keralensis, found in India.
