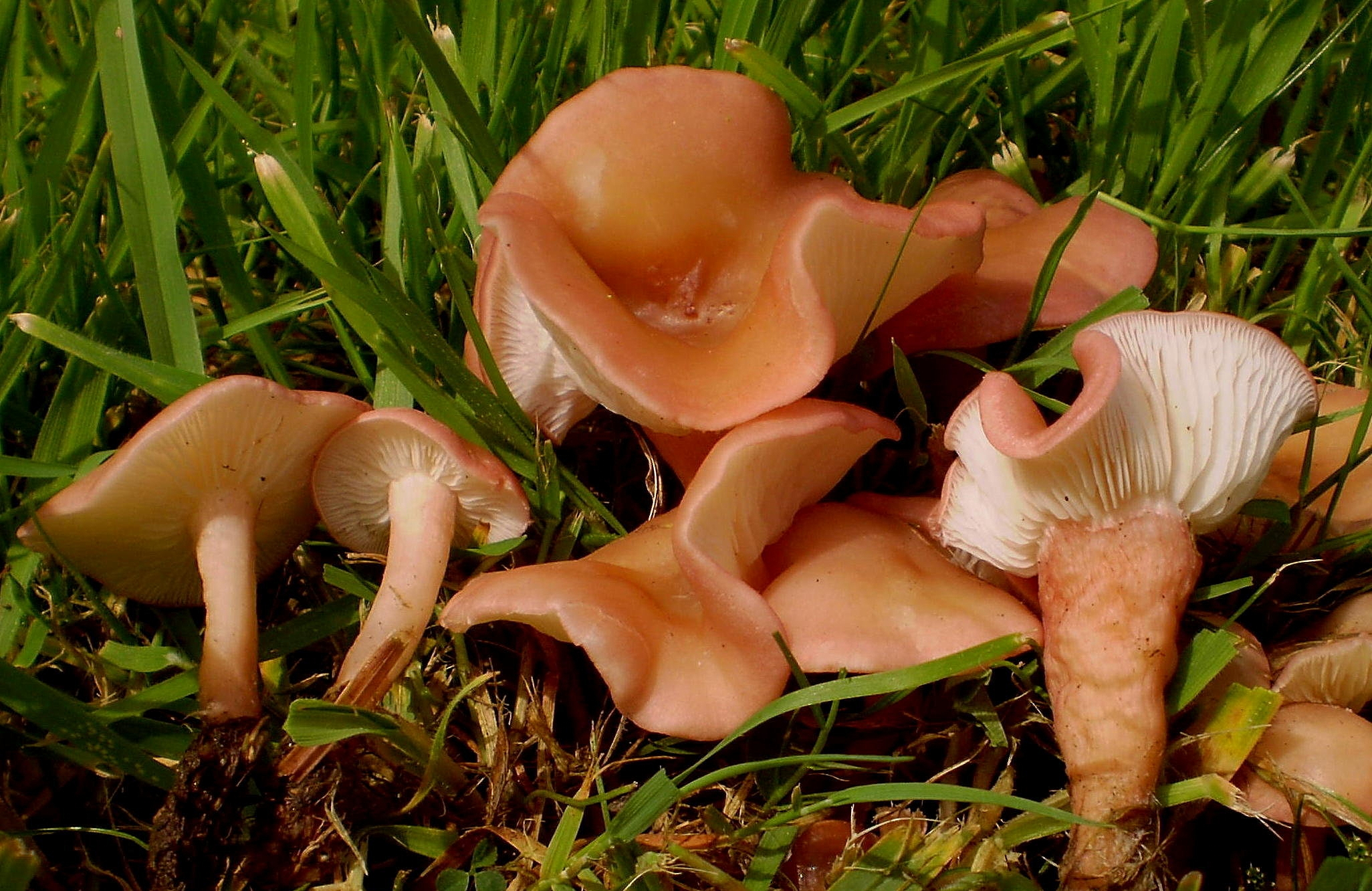

Scientific classification
- Domain: Eukaryota
- Kingdom: Fungi
- Division: Basidiomycota
- Class: Agaricomycetes
- Order: Agaricales
- Family: Lyophyllaceae
- Genus: Calocybe
- Species: C. carnea

Binomial name
- Calocybe carnea (Bull.) Donk (1962)

Synonyms
- List: Agaricus carneus Bull. (1792); Tricholoma carneum (Bull.) P.Kumm (1871); Gyrophila carnea (Bull.) Quél. (1886); Calocybe carnea (Bull.) Kühner (1938); Lyophyllum carneum (Bull.) Kühner & Romagn. (1953); Rugosomyces carneus (Bull.) Bon (1991); Gyrophila carnea var. mammosa Quél. (1890); Collybia readii G. Stev. (1964); Calocybe readii (G. Stev.) E. Horak (1971)

= Calocybe carnea =

Calocybe carnea Mycological characteristics
- Gills on hymenium
- Cap is convex or flat
- Hymenium is adnexed or sinuate
- Stipe is bare
- Spore print is white
- Ecology is saprotrophic
- Edibility is edible but not recommended

Calocybe carnea is a species of fungus in the family Lyophyllaceae. It has small pink-capped mushrooms with white gills and can be found in grassy meadows, fields, or on lawns from spring to autumn in Europe and North America. Its common names include pink fairhead and pink domecap.

== Taxonomy ==
Originally described as Agaricus carneus by the French mycologist Pierre Bulliard in 1792, this small pink mushroom has been through many taxonomical name changes over many years, and as a result has had many binomial names. Its current specific epithet, carnea, is derived from the Latin for "flesh-coloured". The genus name is derived from the Ancient Greek terms kalos "pretty", and cubos "head".

== Description ==
The cap is 1.5–4 cm (0.59–1.57 in) in diameter. It is usually pale pink, but can be darker, pinker, or redder. It usually fades with age. At first it is convex, but later flattens, and has a tendency to become wavy. It is smooth and dry. The stem is up to 4 cm (1.5 in) high and the same colour as the cap, and is smooth, or finely fibrillose; often narrowing towards the base, and often misshapen. The gills are adnexed to almost free; sometimes notched and are white, giving a spore print of the same colour. They are quite closely spaced initially. The flesh is thin and whitish, with little odour or flavour.

=== Similar species ===
A similar species, Rugosomyces persicolor (Fr.) Singer, grows in tufts, has a liking for manured ground and is sometimes recorded as a variety or variant of C. carnea.

== Distribution and habitat ==
Calocybe carnea appears in spring, summer, and early autumn (usually after rain). It is frequent in Britain, Europe, Asia, and North America, growing in grassy meadows and fields and on lawns. It is very rarely found in woods, unless a grassy clearing is present. It seems to tolerate agricultural practices, because its fruiting bodies often appear on fertilized farmland.

== Edibility ==
This mushroom is edible, but is unsubstantial, as it is small and thin fleshed. It is also potentially confused with poisonous species.
