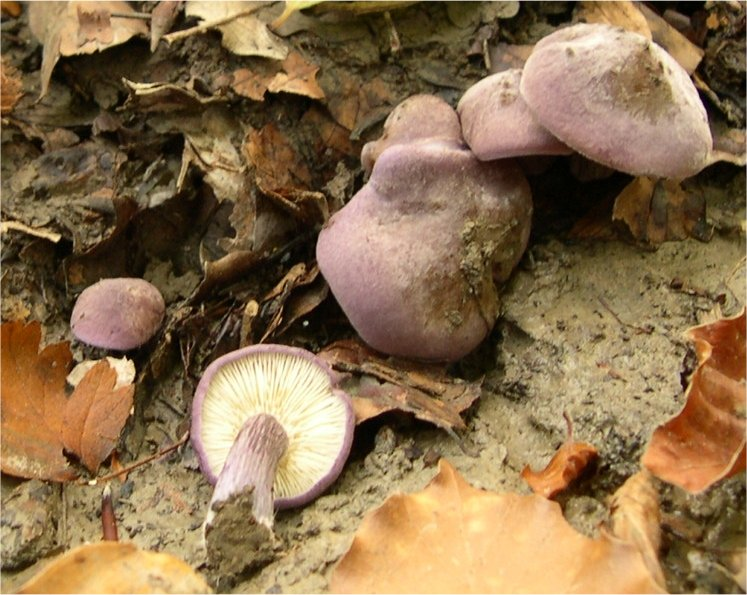
- Calocybe ionides

Scientific classification
- Domain: Eukaryota
- Kingdom: Fungi
- Division: Basidiomycota
- Class: Agaricomycetes
- Order: Agaricales
- Family: Lyophyllaceae
- Genus: Calocybe; Kühner ex Donk

Type species
- Calocybe gambosa

= Calocybe =

Genus of fungi

Calocybe is a small genus of about 40 species of mushroom, including St. George's mushroom, which is edible, and milky mushroom, which is edible and is cultivated in India. There are not many species of this genus in Britain. The name is derived from the Ancient Greek terms kalos "pretty", and cubos "head". Around nine species are found in neotropical regions.

== Species ==
- Calocybe alneti
- Calocybe atropapillata
- Calocybe bipigmentata
- Calocybe carnea — pink fairhead
- Calocybe cerina
- Calocybe chrysenteron
- Calocybe civilis
- Calocybe clusii
- Calocybe coniceps
- Calocybe constricta
- Calocybe cyanea (Puerto Rico, Brazil)
- Calocybe cyanella
- Calocybe cyanocephala
- Calocybe eborina
- Calocybe fallax
- Calocybe gambosa — St. George's mushroom
- Calocybe gangraenosa
- Calocybe georgii
- Calocybe indica — milky mushroom
- Calocybe ionides
- Calocybe onychina
- Calocybe rubra
