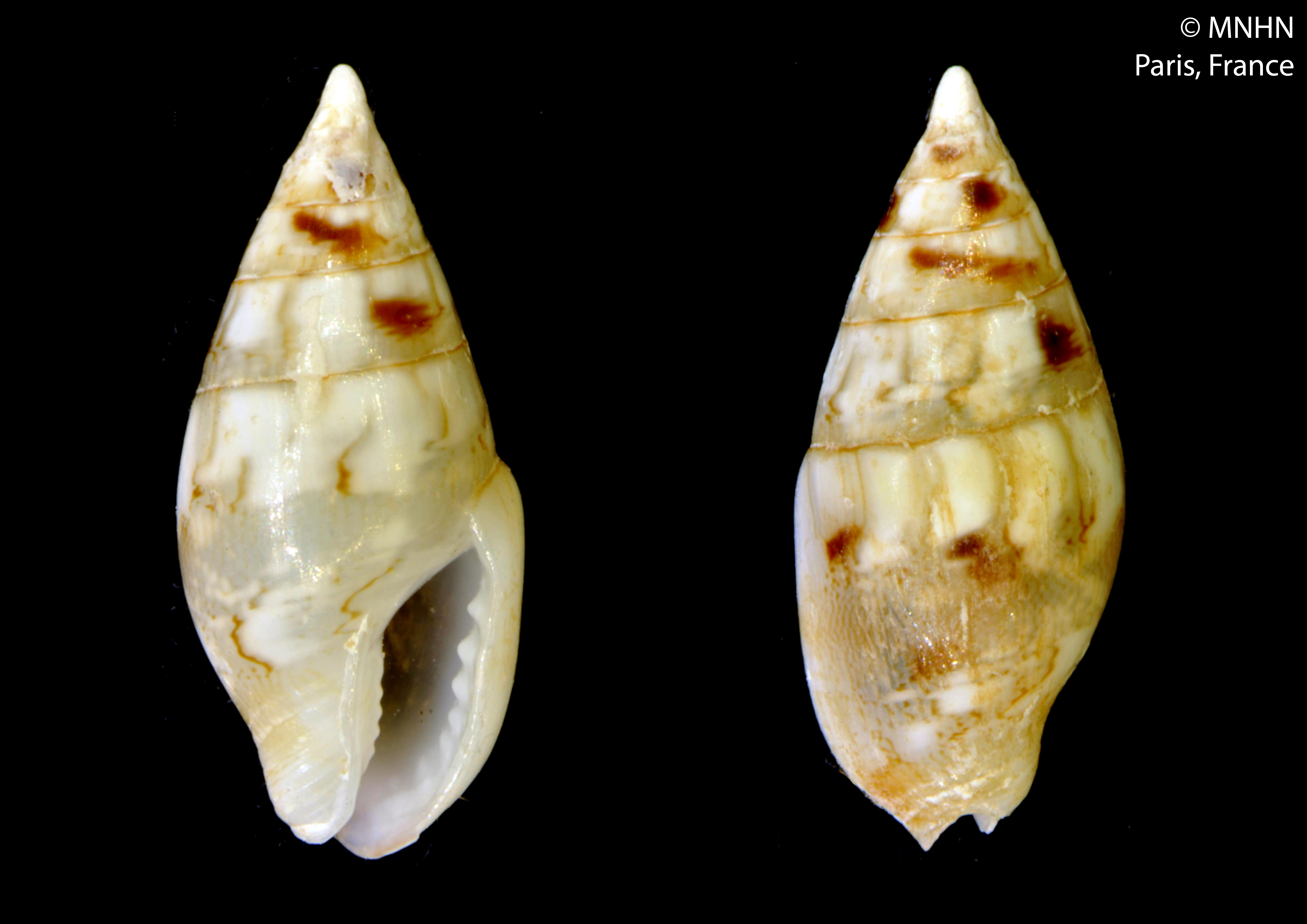

Scientific classification
- Kingdom: Animalia
- Phylum: Mollusca
- Class: Gastropoda
- Subclass: Caenogastropoda
- Order: Neogastropoda
- Family: Columbellidae
- Genus: Graphicomassa
- Species: G. margarita

Binomial name
- Graphicomassa margarita Reeve, 1859

Synonyms
- Columbella margarita Reeve, 1859 (original combination); Columbella varians; Mitrella margarita (Reeve, 1859)

= Graphicomassa margarita =

Species of gastropod

Graphicomassa margarita, common name rice shells, Hawaiian name laiki, is a species of small sea snail in the family Columbellidae, the dove snails. The shells of this species are used to make leis in Hawaii.
