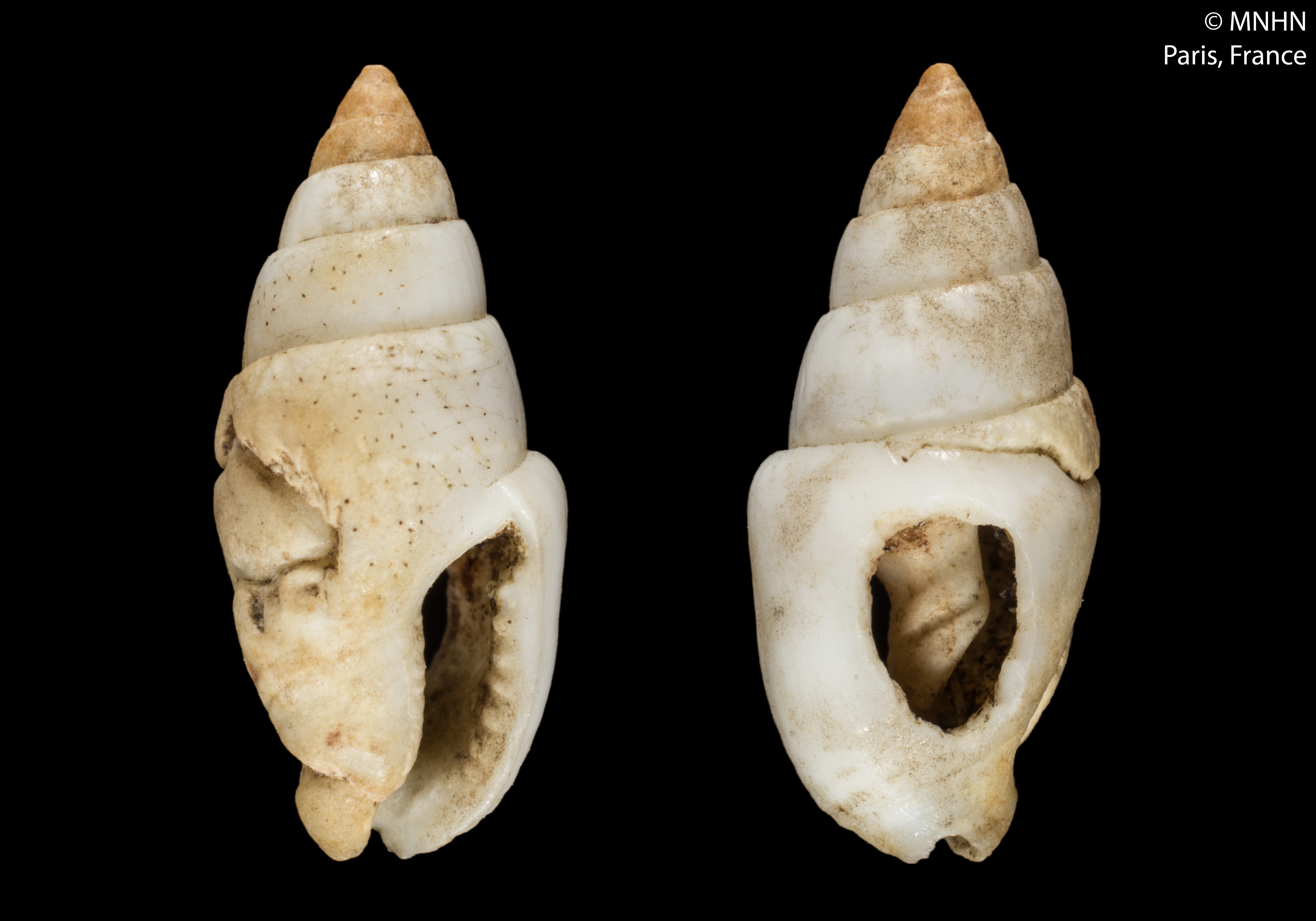
- Shell of Graphicomassa adiostina (lectotype at MNHN, Paris)

Scientific classification
- Kingdom: Animalia
- Phylum: Mollusca
- Class: Gastropoda
- Subclass: Caenogastropoda
- Order: Neogastropoda
- Superfamily: Buccinoidea
- Family: Columbellidae
- Genus: Graphicomassa; Iredale, 1929

Type species
- Columbella ligula Duclos, 1840

Synonyms
- Mitra (Aidone) H. Adams & A. Adams, 1853; Mitrella (Graphicomassa) Iredale, 1929

= Graphicomassa =

Genus of gastropods

Graphicomassa is a genus of sea snails, marine gastropod mollusks in the family Columbellidae.

== Species ==
Species within the genus Graphicomassa include:

- Graphicomassa adiostina (Duclos, 1840)
- Graphicomassa ligula (Duclos, 1840)
- Graphicomassa margarita (Reeve, 1859)

Species brought into synonymy

- Graphicomassa albina (Kiener, 1841): synonym of Graphicomassa ligula (Duclos, 1840)
