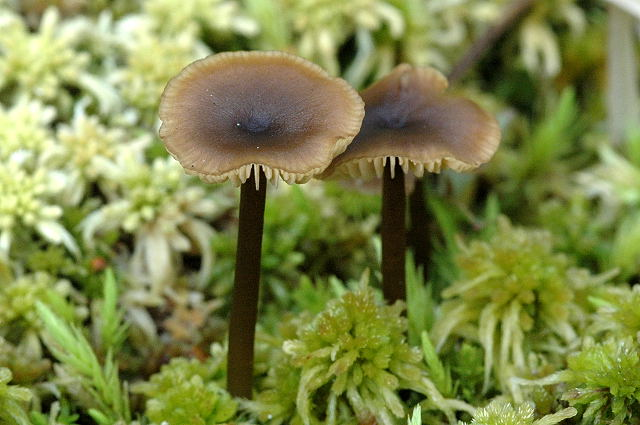
- Brown when moist

Scientific classification
- Kingdom: Fungi
- Division: Basidiomycota
- Class: Agaricomycetes
- Order: Agaricales
- Family: Lyophyllaceae
- Genus: Sphagnurus
- Species: S. paluster

Binomial name
- Sphagnurus paluster (Peck) Redhead & V. Hofstetter 2014

Synonyms
- Agaricus palustris Peck 1872; Mycena palustris (Peck) Sacc. 1887; Tephrophana palustris (Peck) Kühner 1938; Lyophyllum palustre (Peck) Singer 1943; Tephrocybe palustris (Peck) Donk 1962; Bryophyllum palustre (Peck) Vizzini 2014

= Sphagnurus paluster =

Species of fungus

Sphagnurus paluster Mycological characteristics
- Gills on hymenium
- Cap is conical or flat
- Hymenium is adnate or sinuate
- Stipe is bare
- Spore print is white
- Ecology is parasitic
- Edibility is unknown

Sphagnurus paluster is a species of fungus in the family Lyophyllaceae which parasitizes Sphagnum moss. It was first described by Charles Horton Peck in 1872. It is commonly called the sphagnum greyling due to it being found in peat bogs and to its cap turning grey as it ages and dries.

== Description ==
Sphagnurus paluster can be white pruinose when young and does not stain or bruise when crushed. Its flesh is thin, soft, and watery. The cap is 1 to 3 centimetres (0.39 to 1.2 in) in diameter, starting as conical or bell shape when young, expanding flat with a distinct umbo when older. It is smooth, striate, and hygrophanous; usually an olive-brown when moist, drying to a pale grey color. The white to grey gills are adnate or with a slight tooth. Subgills are often present creating a close to subdistant spacing. The stem is 2 to 10 centimetres (0.79 to 3.9 in) long and 1 to 5 mm (0.039 to 0.20 in) in diameter, equal and hollow. The coloring is usually lighter than the cap, being grey-brown or grey. The white to cream colored spores are 5.5 to 8.5 μm x 4 to 4.5 μm, elliptical, and smooth. This mushroom may have a farinaceous odor when fresh.

== Distribution and habitat ==
Grows in spring to early summer in cool northern climates that support Sphagnum. Found single to gregarious, often growing in bogs or ditches always on Sphagnum.

== Parasitism ==
Sphagnurus paluster parasitizes living Sphagnum mosses by forming penetration pegs through hyphae pressure. At the tips of these pegs pectinases are produced to digest the lamella between leaf cells which facilitates entry into both hyaline and chlorophyllous cells. The result is a deterioration of the protoplast and necrosis of the cells. The rate of parasitic expansion is theorized to be related to the amount of available nitrogen in the host and parasite mediums.
