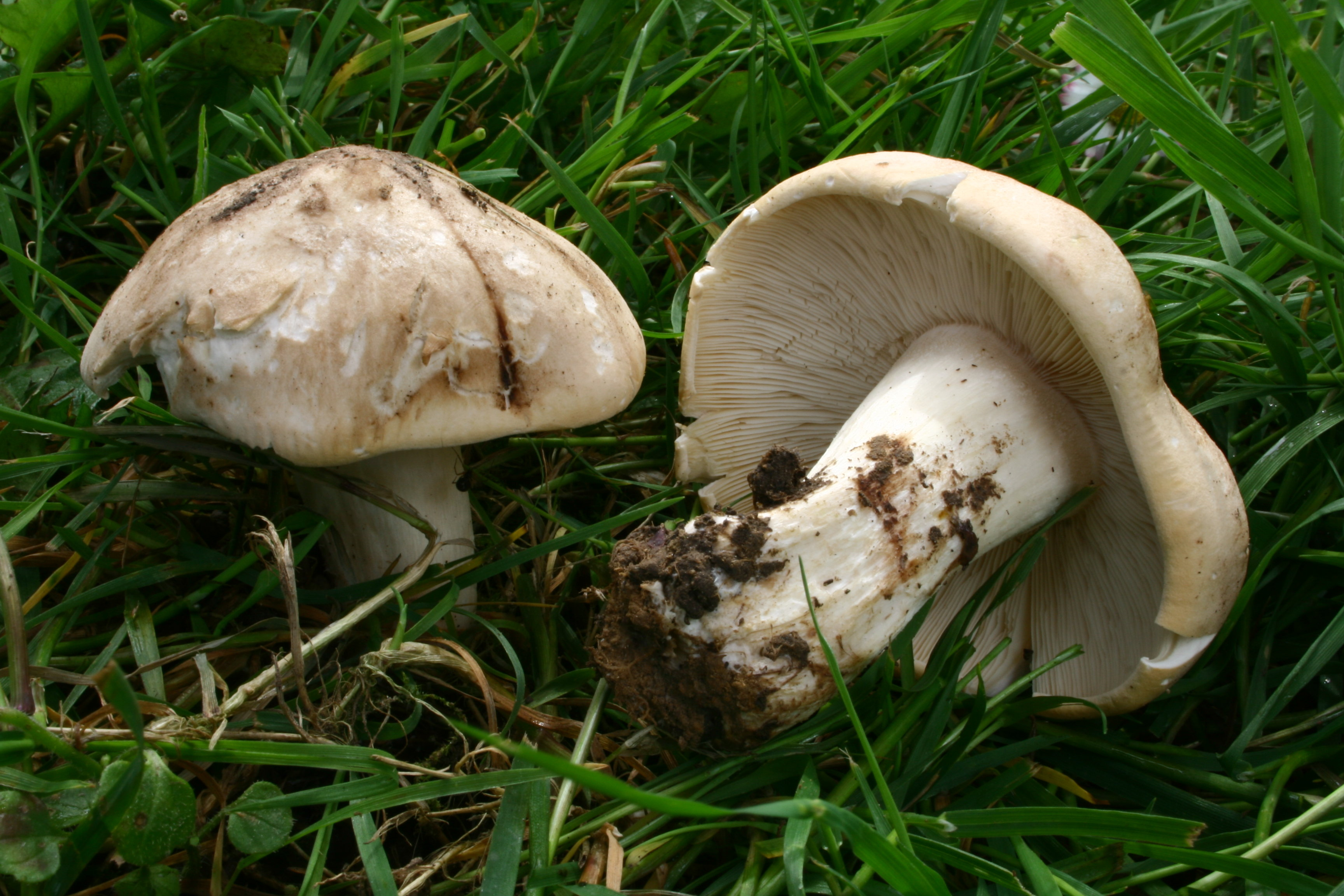

Scientific classification
- Kingdom: Fungi
- Division: Basidiomycota
- Class: Agaricomycetes
- Order: Agaricales
- Family: Lyophyllaceae
- Genus: Calocybe
- Species: C. gambosa

Binomial name
- Calocybe gambosa (Fr.) Donk (1962)

Synonyms
- Tricholoma gambosum

= Calocybe gambosa =

Calocybe gambosa
- Mycological characteristics
- Gills on hymenium
- Cap is convex
- Hymenium is sinuate
- Stipe is bare
- Spore print is white
- Ecology is mycorrhizal or saprotrophic
- Edibility is choice

Calocybe gambosa, commonly known as St. George's mushroom, is a species of fungus. It was previously considered a part of large genus Tricholoma. Its common name is derived from Saint George's Day (23 April), around when it appears in the United Kingdom.

The mushroom grows mainly in European grasslands. It is considered a delicacy in Europe.

== Taxonomy ==
Initially described as Agaricus gambosus by Elias Magnus Fries in his 1821 work Systema Mycologicum, with its specific epithet derived from a Latin term for "club footed" in relation to its bulky stipe. It was later named Tricholoma gambosum by Paul Kummer in 1871, before being reclassified as Calocybe gambosa by Marinus Anton Donk in 1962. In Germany it is known as Maipilz, where it fruits in May. The genus name is derived from the Ancient Greek terms kalos "pretty", and cubos "head". In Denmark it is called Vårmousseron, appearing in early May.

It derives its common name from when it first appears in the United Kingdom, around Saint George's Day (23 April).

== Description ==
The cap measures from 5–15 cm (2 to 6 inches) in diameter and has a smooth texture with ridges on it. The colour of the cap, stipe and flesh ranges from white to creamy. The sinuate gills are white and crowded. The stubby stipe is bulky at the base. The flesh is dense and soft, with a mealy or cucumber smell. The spore print is white.

=== Similar species ===
Care must be taken not to confuse it with the highly poisonous Inosperma erubescens, which grows in the same habitats. The latter has a more pungent fruity smell and bruises red. Entoloma sinuatum, also poisonous, has a rancid smell. Additionally, it may resemble the inedible Melanoleuca strictipes.

== Distribution and habitat ==
Calocybe gambosa is common in grasslands in Europe, often in areas rich in limestone. It is common on the Swedish islands Öland and Gotland, both situated in the Baltic Sea. On the South Downs in southern England, it has formed huge fairy rings that appear to be several hundred years old. It is found from April to June in the United Kingdom, earlier in warmer countries and later in cooler ones. It appears in March in Italy, hence its regional name marzolino (also known as prugnolo).

== Uses ==
The mushroom is best picked in dry weather. Although it resembles some poisonous species, it can be eaten cooked, pickled, and evidently raw.

The species is imported in commercial quantities from Romania, Hungary, and Turkey. It was held in high esteem in medieval Italy, reported by Costanzo Felici in 1569 as the most expensive and highly regarded mushroom in Umbria and Marches in central Italy. It was also held in high esteem in the Apennine Mountains region—Liguria, Tuscany, and Emilia-Romagna)—by Giovanni Targioni Tozzetti in 1777. It is still locally eaten in Emilia-Romagna and Tuscany.

St. George's mushroom is highly prized in the Basque Country of northern Spain, where it fetches very high prices. In Álava, it is traditionally eaten on the feast of Saint Prudentius (28 April), alongside snails. The mushroom is also a cornerstone of the gastronomy of Bilbao, where it is typically eaten in an omelette. The demand in the Basque Country is so high the mushroom has to be imported from Eastern Europe.
