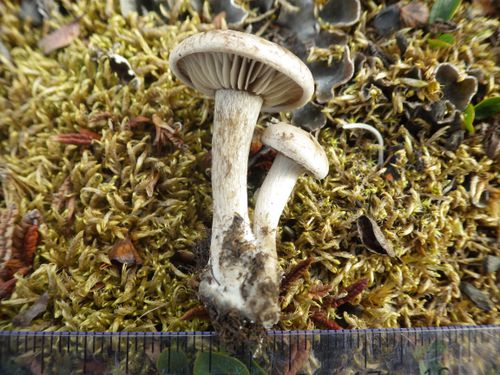
- Atractosporocybe inornata

Scientific classification
- Kingdom: Fungi
- Division: Basidiomycota
- Class: Agaricomycetes
- Order: Agaricales
- Family: Lyophyllaceae
- Genus: Atractosporocybe; P.Alvarado, G.Moreno, & Vizzini (2015)

Type species
- Agaricus inornatus Sowerby (1803)

= Atractosporocybe =

Genus of fungi

Atractosporocybe is a mushroom genus in the family Lyophyllaceae in the broad sense. The type species resembles Clitocybe and grows in forests.

== Etymology ==
The name Atractosporocybe is derived from ancient Greek atractos referring to the fusiform shape of the spores ('-sporo) and '-cybe, a reference to head or cap.

== See also ==
- List of Agaricales genera
