= Graphicomassa ligula =

Scientific classification
- Kingdom: Animalia
- Phylum: Mollusca
- Class: Gastropoda
- Subclass: Caenogastropoda
- Order: Neogastropoda
- Family: Columbellidae
- Genus: Graphicomassa
- Species: G. ligula

Binomial name
- Graphicomassa ligula (Duclos, 1835)

Synonyms
- Columbella acicula Reeve, 1858; Columbella carnea Hervier, R.P.J., 1899; Columbella lactea Duclos, 1835; Columbella ligula Duclos, 1835 (basionym); Columbella ligula var. carnea Hervier, 1899; Columbella ligula var. nivalis Hervier, 1899; Columbella nivalis Hervier, R.P.J., 1899; Columbella seychellensis Smith, 1884; Mitra insignis C.B. Adams, 1853; Mitrella ligula (Duclos, 1840); Pyrene ligula (Duclos, 1835)

Species of gastropod

Graphicomassa ligula is a species of sea snail, a marine gastropod mollusc in the family Columbellidae, the dove snails.

== Description ==
The shell size varies between 11 mm and 25 mm.

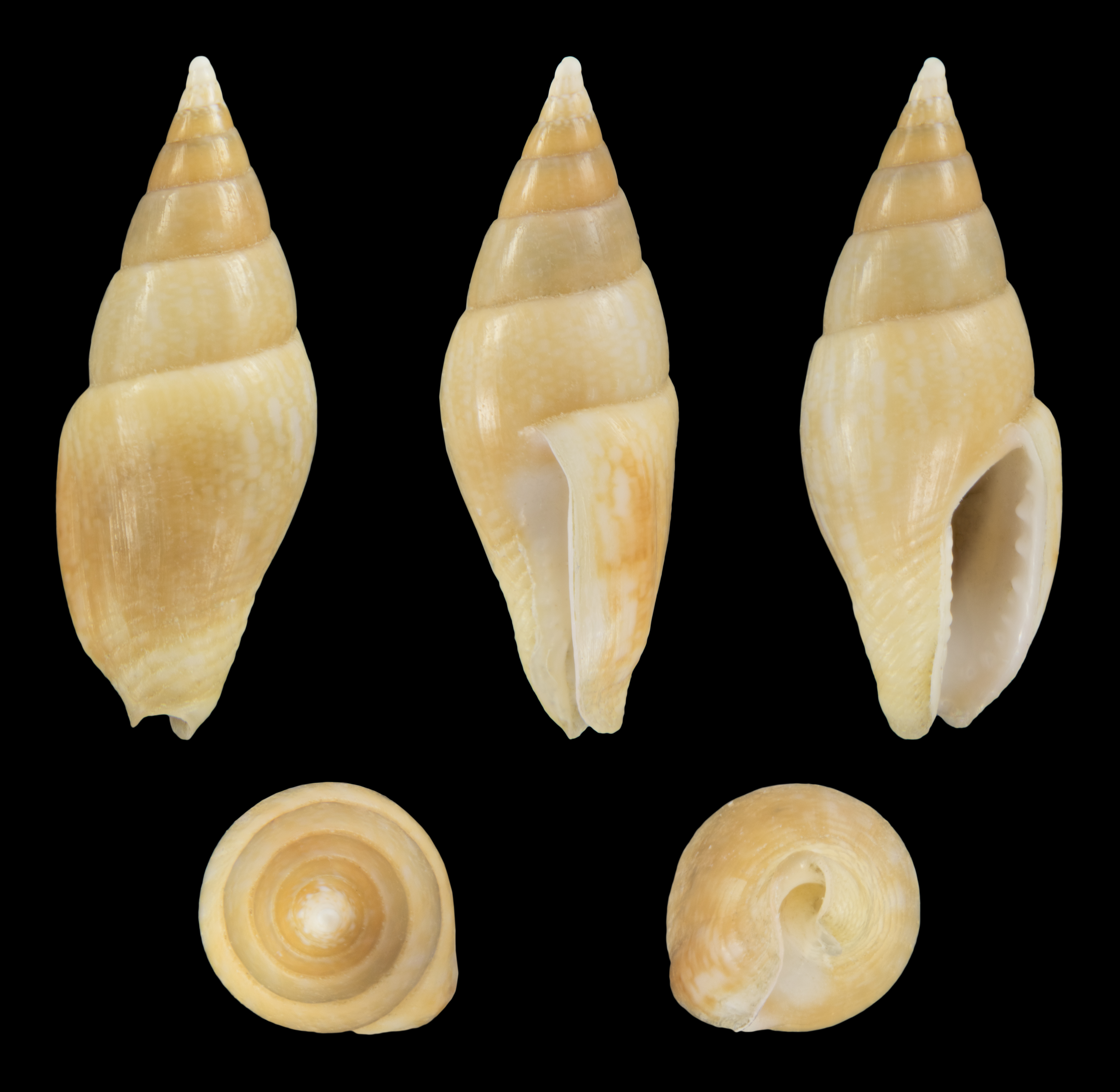
Unicoloured form

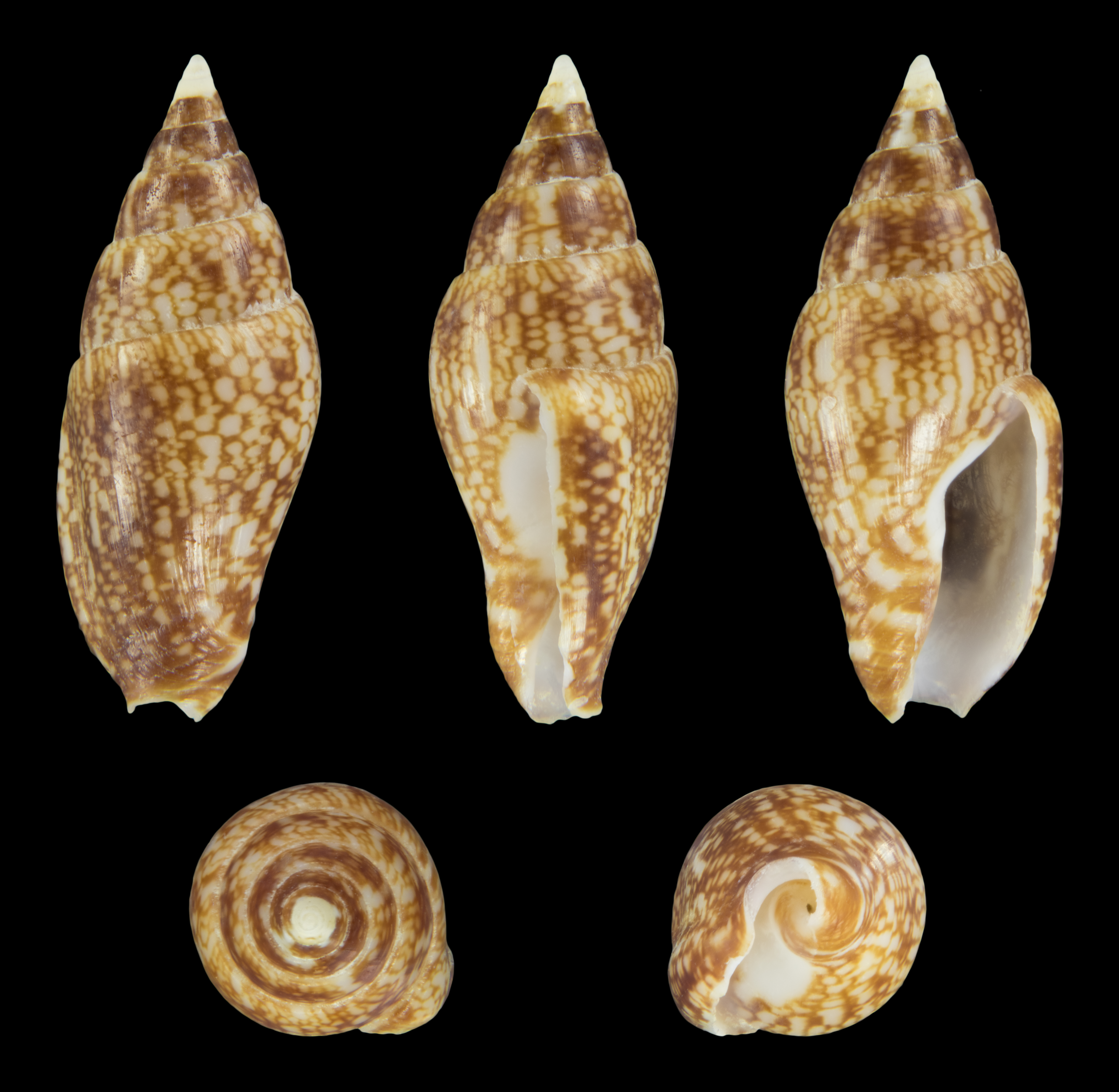
Dotted form

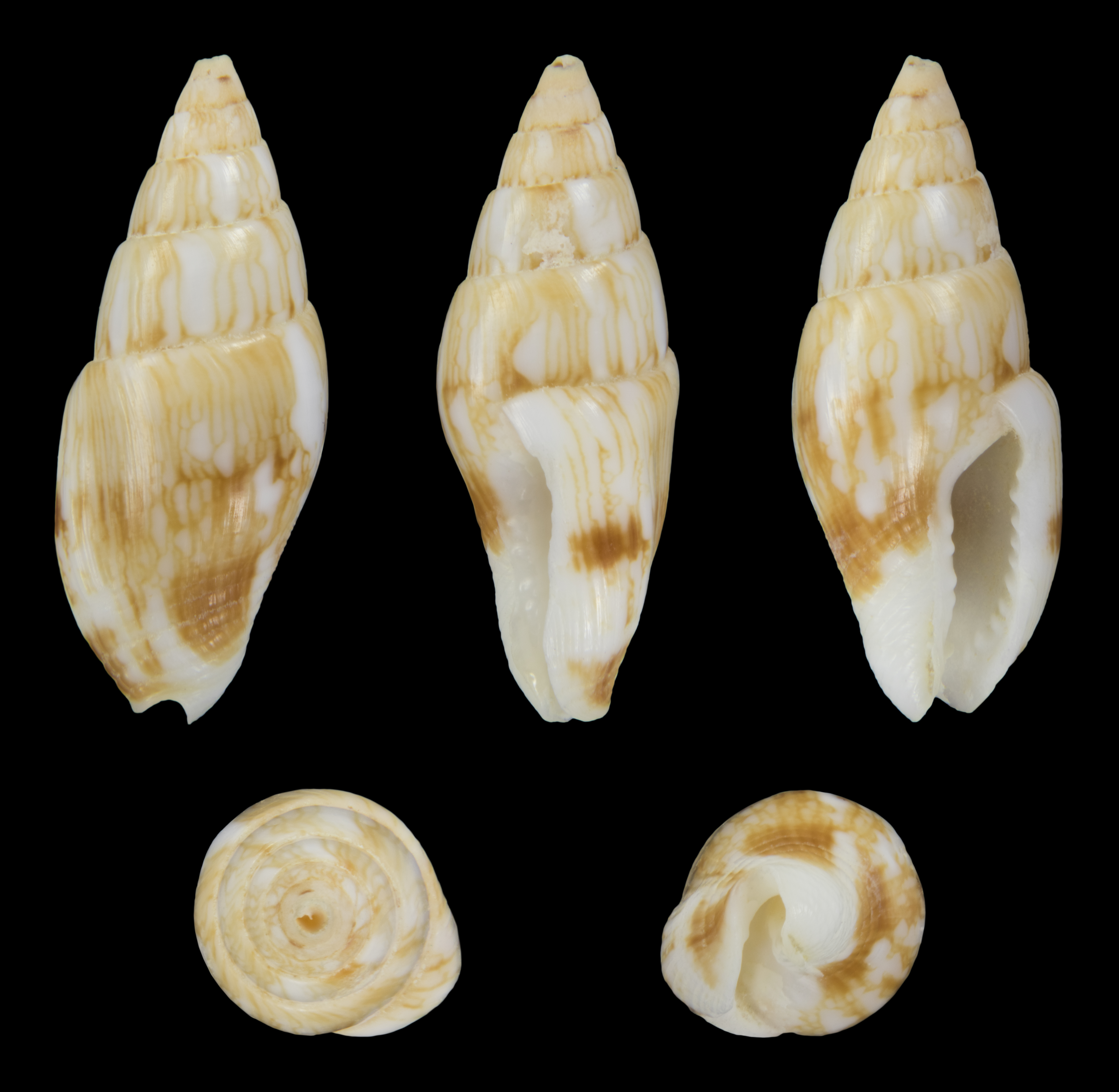
Flame-like pattern

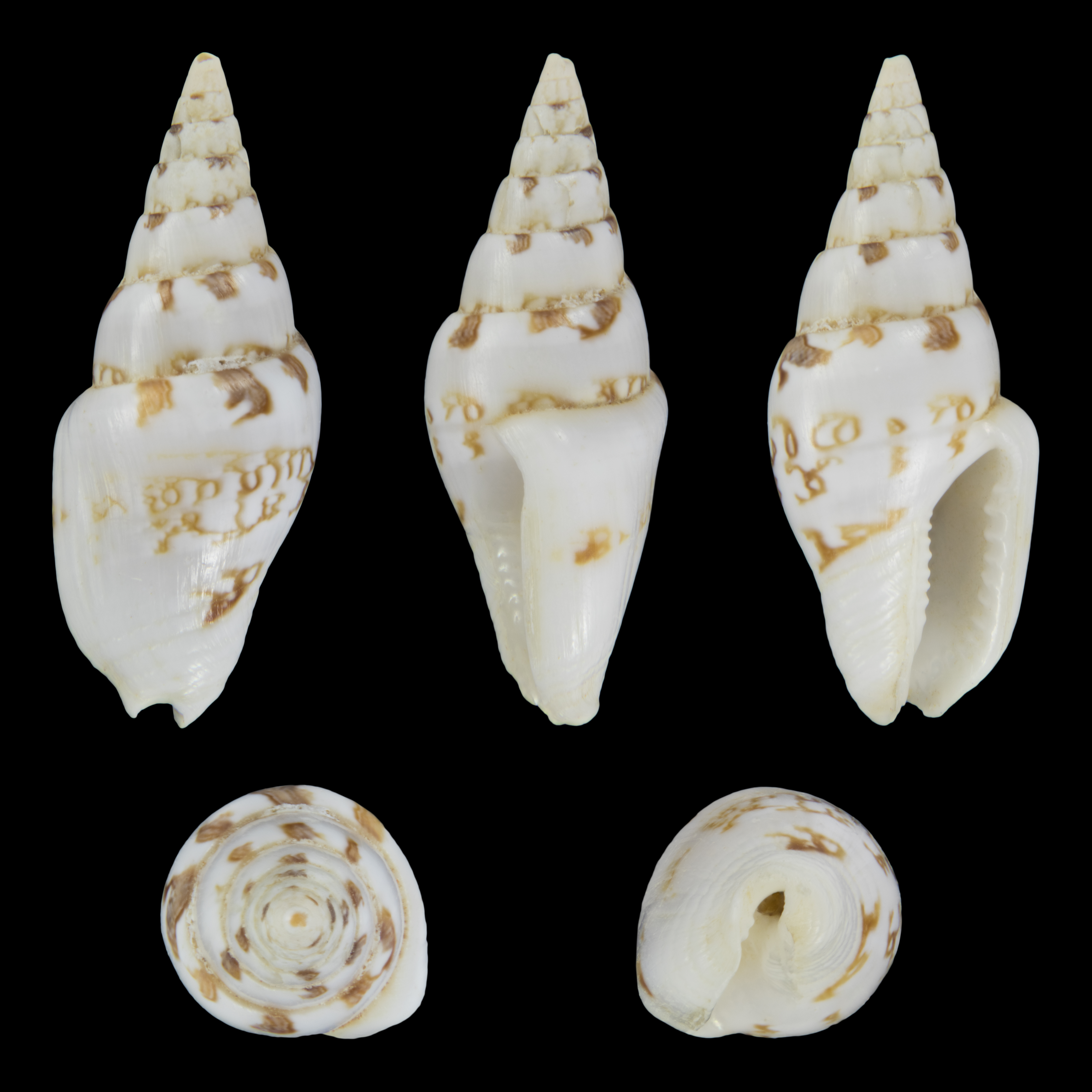
White with brown pattern

== Distribution ==
This species occurs in the Indian Ocean off Aldabra, and Réunion, and in the Indo-West Pacific, and off New Zealand.
