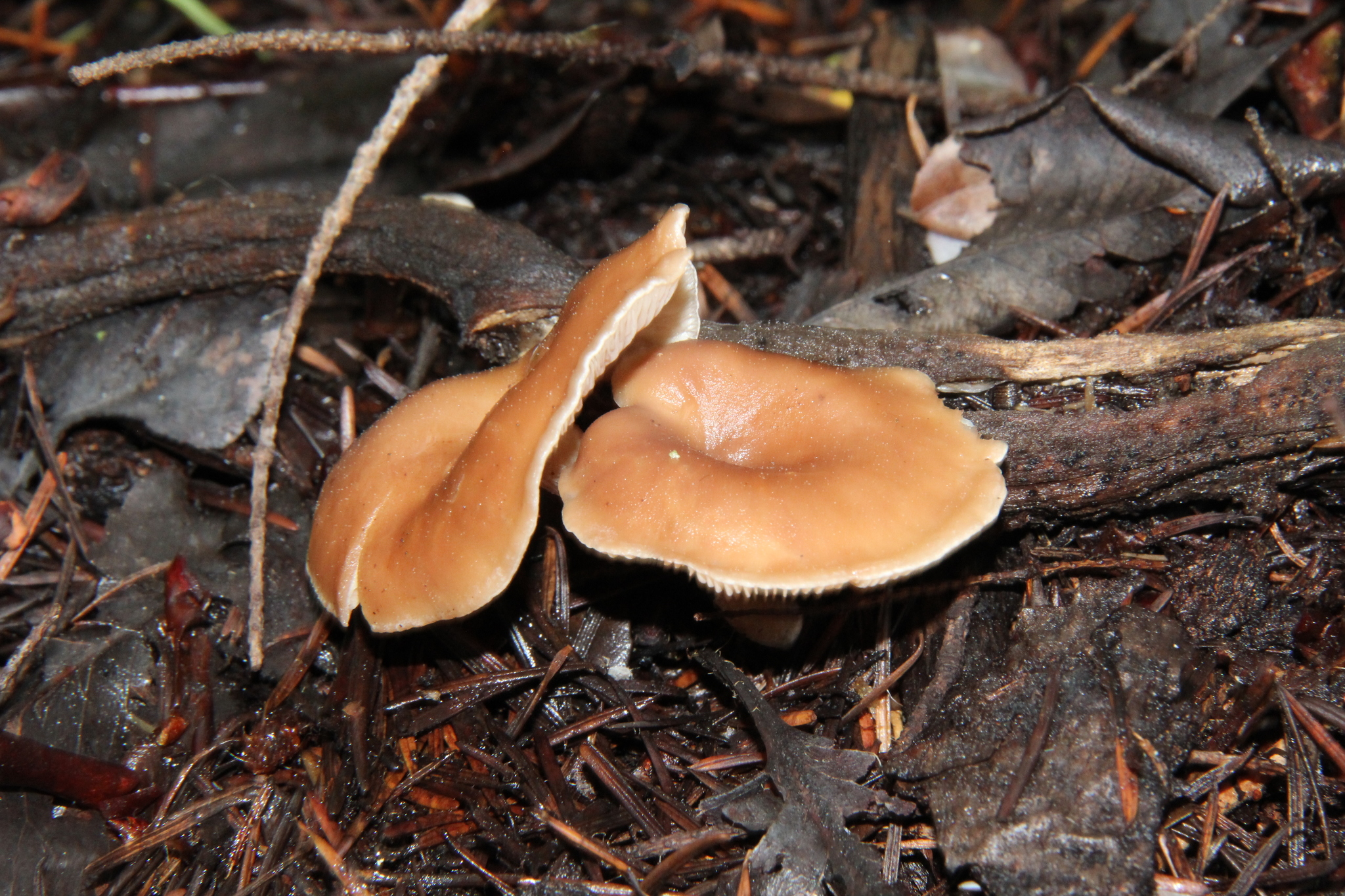
- Rhizocybe vermicularis

Scientific classification
- Kingdom: Fungi
- Division: Basidiomycota
- Class: Agaricomycetes
- Order: Agaricales
- Family: Lyophyllaceae
- Genus: Rhizocybe; Vizzini, G.Moreno, P.Alvarado & Consiglio (2015)

Type species
- Rhizocybe vermicularis (Fr.) Vizzini, G.Moreno, P.Alvarado & Consiglio (2015)

= Rhizocybe =

Genus of fungi

Rhizocybe is a genus of fungus in the order Agaricales. The species resemble Clitocybe and grow amongst litter in predominantly coniferous forests.

== Etymology ==
The name Rhizocybe is derived from ancient Greek rhizo referring to its rhizoids, and '-cybe', a reference to head or cap.

== See also ==
- List of Agaricales genera
