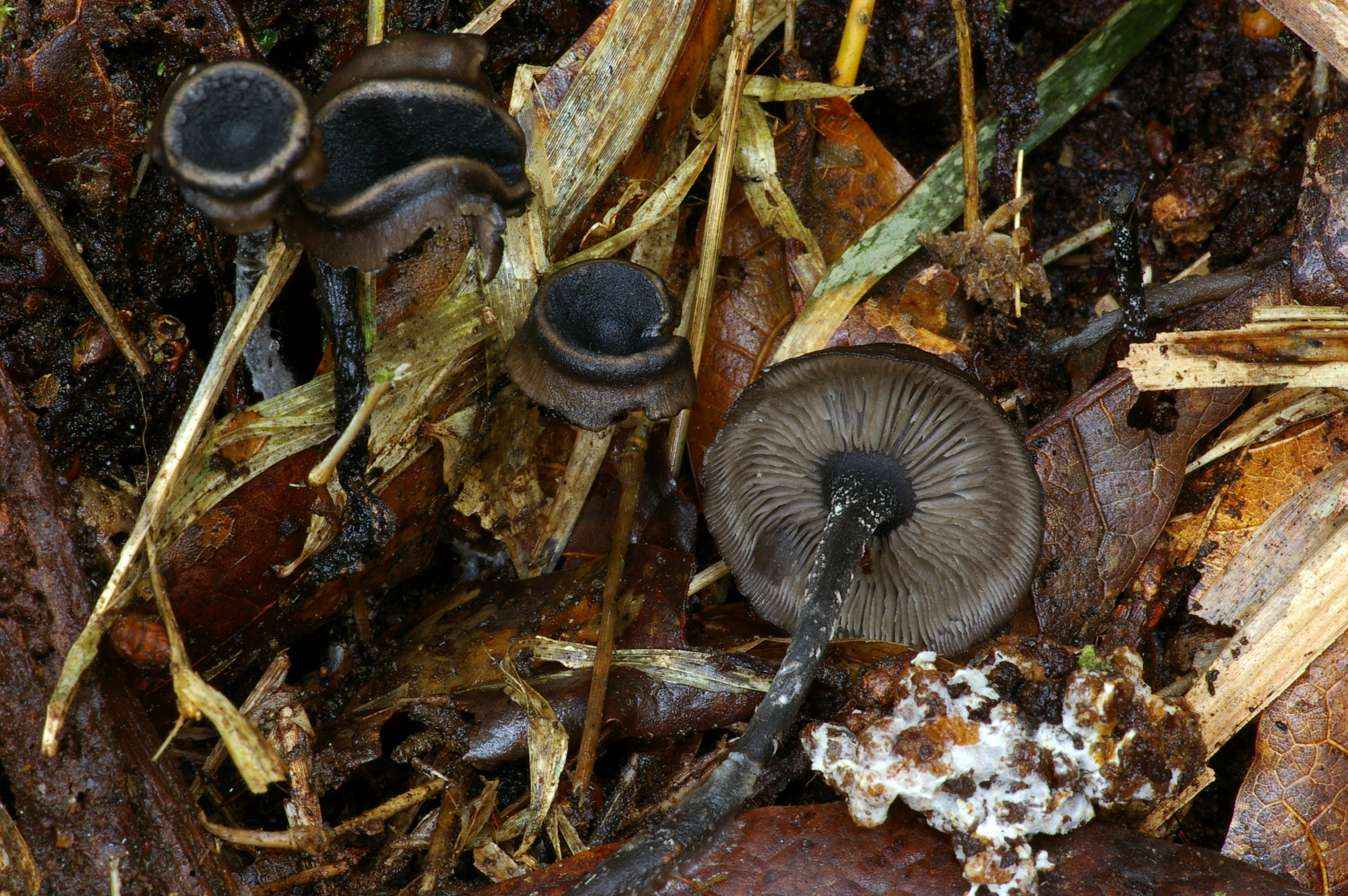
- In Murillo, Colombia

Scientific classification
- Kingdom: Fungi
- Division: Basidiomycota
- Class: Agaricomycetes
- Order: Agaricales
- Family: Lyophyllaceae
- Genus: Blastosporella; T.J.Baroni & Franco-Mol. (2007)

Type species
- Blastosporella zonata T.J.Baroni & Franco-Mol. (2007)

= Blastosporella =

Genus of fungi

Blastosporella is a fungal genus in the family Lyophyllaceae. The genus is monotypic, containing the single South American species Blastosporella zonata, described as new to science in 2007. The fungus produces fruit bodies characterized by producing spherical balls of blastospores that cover the cap surface in maturity.
