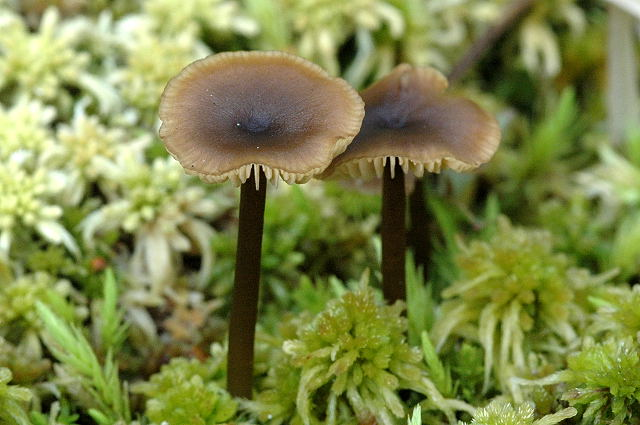
- Tephrocybe palustris

Scientific classification
- Domain: Eukaryota
- Kingdom: Fungi
- Division: Basidiomycota
- Class: Agaricomycetes
- Order: Agaricales
- Family: Lyophyllaceae
- Genus: Tephrocybe; Donk

Type species
- Tephrocybe rancida (Fr.) Donk

= Tephrocybe =

Genus of fungi

Tephrocybe is a genus of about 40 species of mushroom, with a widespread distribution in temperate areas. The genus was circumscribed by Dutch mycologist Marinus Anton Donk in 1962.

== Species ==
- Tephrocybe ambusta
- Tephrocybe anthracophila
- Tephrocybe atrata
- Tephrocybe baeosperma
- Tephrocybe boudieri
- Tephrocybe cessans
- Tephrocybe confusa
- Tephrocybe ellisii
- Tephrocybe ferruginella
- Tephrocybe fuscipes
- Tephrocybe fusispora
- Tephrocybe impexa
- Tephrocybe inolens
- Tephrocybe langei
- Tephrocybe mephitica
- Tephrocybe murina
- Tephrocybe osmophora
- Tephrocybe platypus
- Tephrocybe putida
- Tephrocybe rancida
- Tephrocybe striipilea
- Tephrocybe tylicolor
