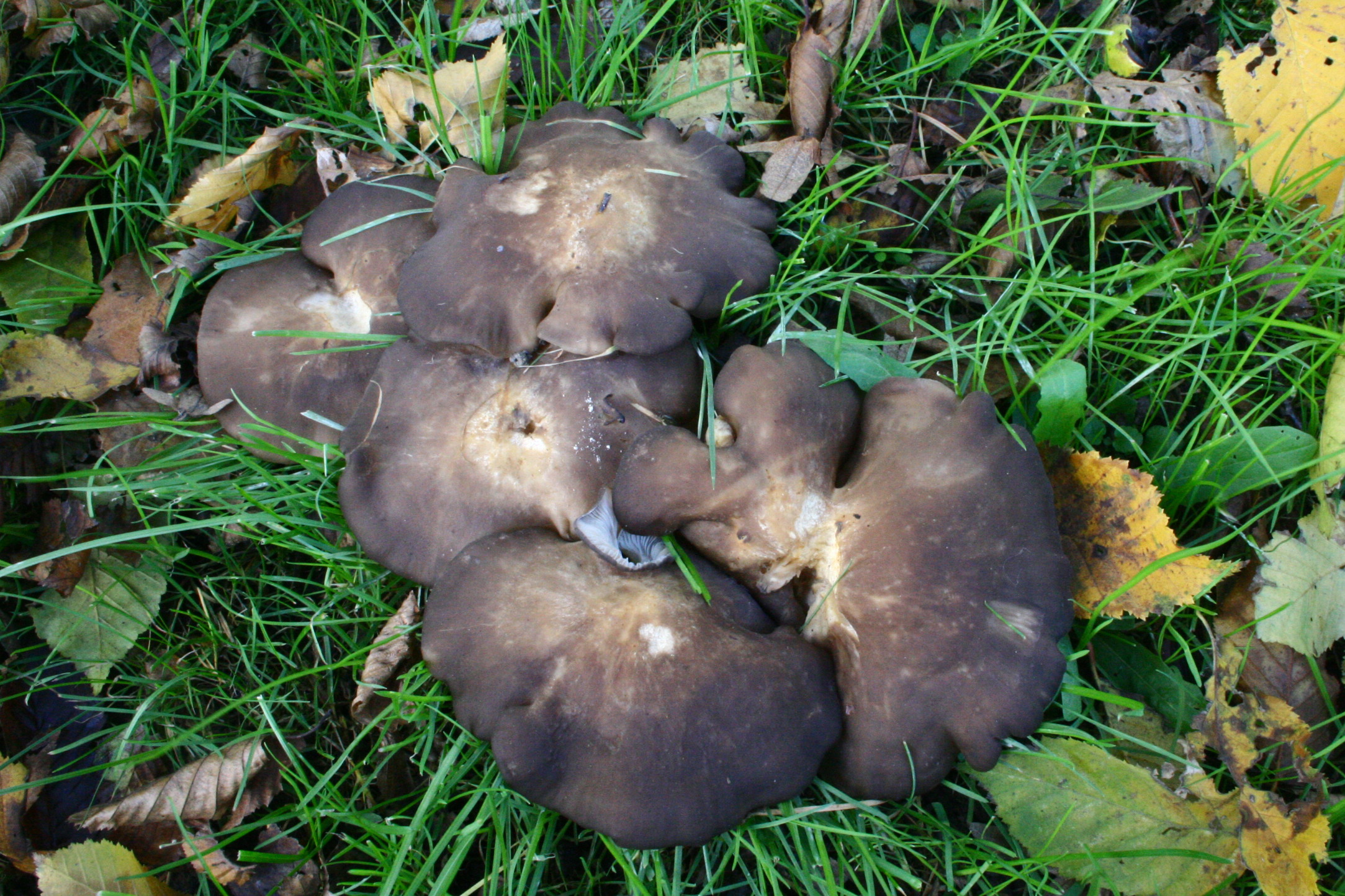
- Lyophyllum loricatum

Scientific classification
- Kingdom: Fungi
- Division: Basidiomycota
- Class: Agaricomycetes
- Order: Agaricales
- Family: Lyophyllaceae
- Genus: Lyophyllum; P.Karst. (1881)

Type species
- Lyophyllum semitale (Fr.) Kühner ex Kalamees (1994)

Synonyms
- Caesposus Nüesch (1937); Gerhardtia Bon (1994)

= Lyophyllum =

Genus of fungi

Lyophyllum is a genus of about 40 species of fungi, widespread in north temperate regions.

== Species ==
- Lyophyllum brunneum
- Lyophyllum decastes
- Lyophyllum eucalypticum
- Lyophyllum eustygium
- Lyophyllum favrei
- Lyophyllum fumosum
- Lyophyllum fuscobrunneum
- Lyophyllum gangraenosum
- Lyophyllum hypoxanthum
- Lyophyllum impudicum
- Lyophyllum infidum
- Lyophyllum infumatum
- Lyophyllum konradianum
- Lyophyllum leucophaeatum
- Lyophyllum littoralis
- Lyophyllum longisporum
- Lyophyllum loricatum
- Lyophyllum praslinense
- Lyophyllum pseudoloricatum
- Lyophyllum rhombisporum — Yunnan Province, China
- Lyophyllum rosae-mariae
- Lyophyllum sabinum
- Lyophyllum semitale
- Lyophyllum shimeji
- Lyophyllum transforme
- Lyophyllum trigonosporum
- Lyophyllum ulmarium
