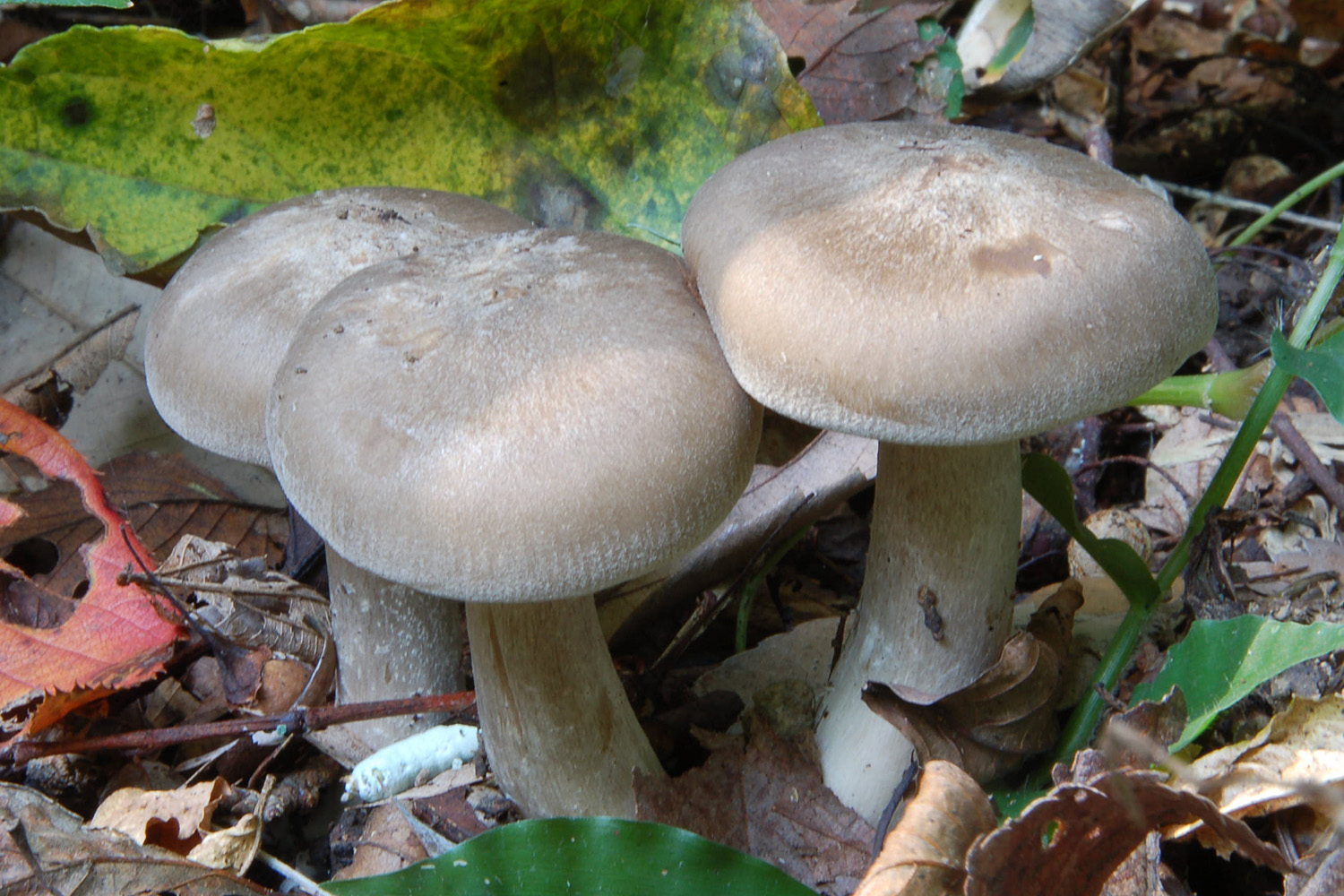
- Lyophyllum decastes, also known as the 'fried chicken mushroom' (Not to be confused with chicken of the woods)

Scientific classification
- Kingdom: Fungi
- Division: Basidiomycota
- Class: Agaricomycetes
- Order: Agaricales
- Family: Lyophyllaceae; Jülich (1981)

Type genus
- Lyophyllum P.Karst. (1881)

Genera
- Arthromyces; Asterophora; Blastosporella; Caesposus; Calocybe; Gerhardtia; Hypsizygus; Lyophyllopsis; Lyophyllum; Myochromella; Ossicaulis; Rugosomyces; Sagaranella; Sphagnurus; Tephrocybe; Termitomyces; Termitosphaera; Tricholomella

= Lyophyllaceae =

Family of fungi

The Lyophyllaceae is a family of fungi in the order Agaricales. A 2008 estimate indicated eight genera and 157 species; as of November 2014, the Catalog of Life lists 13 genera in the family. The taxon was originally circumscribed in 1938 by mycologist Robert Kühner as the tribe Lyophylleae (in the family Tricholomataceae), but raised to the taxonomic rank of family and renamed the Lyophyllaceae by Walter Jülich in 1981.

Some species are popular as edible fungi, such as the brown beech mushroom Hypsizygus tessulatus, the St. George's mushroom Calocybe gambosa, and Lyophyllum shimeji.

== Taxonomy ==
Leucocybe, Atractosporocybe, and Rhizocybe are genera that were segregated from Clitocybe based on molecular phylogenetic studies that found that these clades were more closely related to the families Lyophyllaceae and Entolomataceae than to Clitocybe proper. Subsequent studies have found that these genera, along with Hypsizygus, are part of a larger clade that forms a sister group to the family Lyophyllaceae. This clade together, with the core Lyophyllaceae clade, are often designated Lyophyllaceae sensu lato in (as of 2025) current mycological literature. Lyophyllaceae sensu lato in turn is a sister group to the Entolomataceae.

== Genera ==
The family currently includes the following clades and genera:

=== Lyophyllaceae sensu stricto ===
- Asterophora
- Blastosporella
- Calocybe
- Calocybella
- Gerhardtia
- Lyophyllopsis
- Lyophyllum
- Myochromella
- Ossicaulis
- Rugosomyces
- Sagaranella
- Tephrocybe
- Tephrocybella
- Termitomyces
- Termitosphaera

=== Lyophyllaceae sensu lato ===
- Atractosporocybe
- Hypsizygus
- Leucocybe
- Rhizocybe
- Trichocybe

== See also ==
- List of Agaricales families
