= Henry Burrows =

Henry Burrows may refer to:

- Henry Burrows (cricketer) (1771–1829), English cricketer
- Henry William Burrows (1858–1939), English architect and amateur palaeontologist
- Harry Burrows (born 1941), English footballer
- Larry Burrows (Henry Frank Leslie Burrows, 1926–1971), English photojournalist
