= Estonian Naturalists' Society =

Organization based in Estonia

Logo

Estonian Naturalists' Society (Estonian: Eesti Looduseuurijate Selts, ELUS) is the oldest Estonia-based society of naturalists. It was founded in 1853, and since establishing has been the major scientific organisation focusing on natural history of Estonia.

The society is based in Tartu. It has been associated with Tartu University and the Estonian Academy of Sciences. The society still operates (2018) and claims to be the oldest scientific society in the Baltic states.

The society owns a rich library that is specialised on the publications about Estonian nature. Society site: elus.ee.

== Presidents of the Society ==
- Carl Eduard von Liphardt (1853–1862)
- Guido Samson von Himmelstiern (1862–1868)
- Carl Johann von Seidlitz (1868–1869)
- Karl Ernst von Baer (1869–1876)
- Friedrich von Bidder (1877–1890)
- Johann Georg Dragendorff (1890–1893)
- Carl Schmidt (1894)
- Edmund August Friedrich Russow (1895–1897)
- Julius von Kennel (1898–1899)
- Karl Gottfried Constantin Dehio (1899–1901)
- Grigori Levitski (1901–1905)
- Nikolai Kuznetsov (1905–1911)
- Jevgeni Shepilevski (1911–1918)
- Boris Sreznevsky (1918)
- Georg Landesen (1918–1923)
- Johannes Piiper (1923–1929)
- Paul Kogerman (1929–1936)
- Hugo Kaho (1936–1939)
- Teodor Lippmaa (1939–1942)
- Armin Öpik (1944)
- Karl Orviku (1946–1952)
- Harald Haberman (1952–1954)
- Eerik Kumari (1954–1964)
- Hans-Voldemar Trass (1964–1973 and 1985–1991)
- Erast Parmasto (1973–1976)
- Kuulo Kalamees (1976–1985)
- Kalevi Kull (1991–1994)
- Tõnu Möls (1994–2004)
- Marek Sammul (2004–2008)
- Tõnu Viik (2008–2014)
- Oive Tinn (2014–2017)
- Urmas Kõljalg (2017–)

== See also ==
- Jakob von Uexküll Centre
- Estonian Malacological Society
- Spring school on theoretical biology
