= Winckworth =

Winckworth is an English given and family name. Notable people include:

== Surname ==
- Ronald Winckworth (1884–1950), British natural historian
- William Winckworth (1870–1941), English footballer

See also Winkworth

== Given name ==
- Winckworth Allan Gay (1821–1910), American landscape artist
- Winckworth Tonge (1727–1792), Canadian soldier, land owner and political figure
