= Heli Susi =

Estonian teacher and translator (1929–2020)

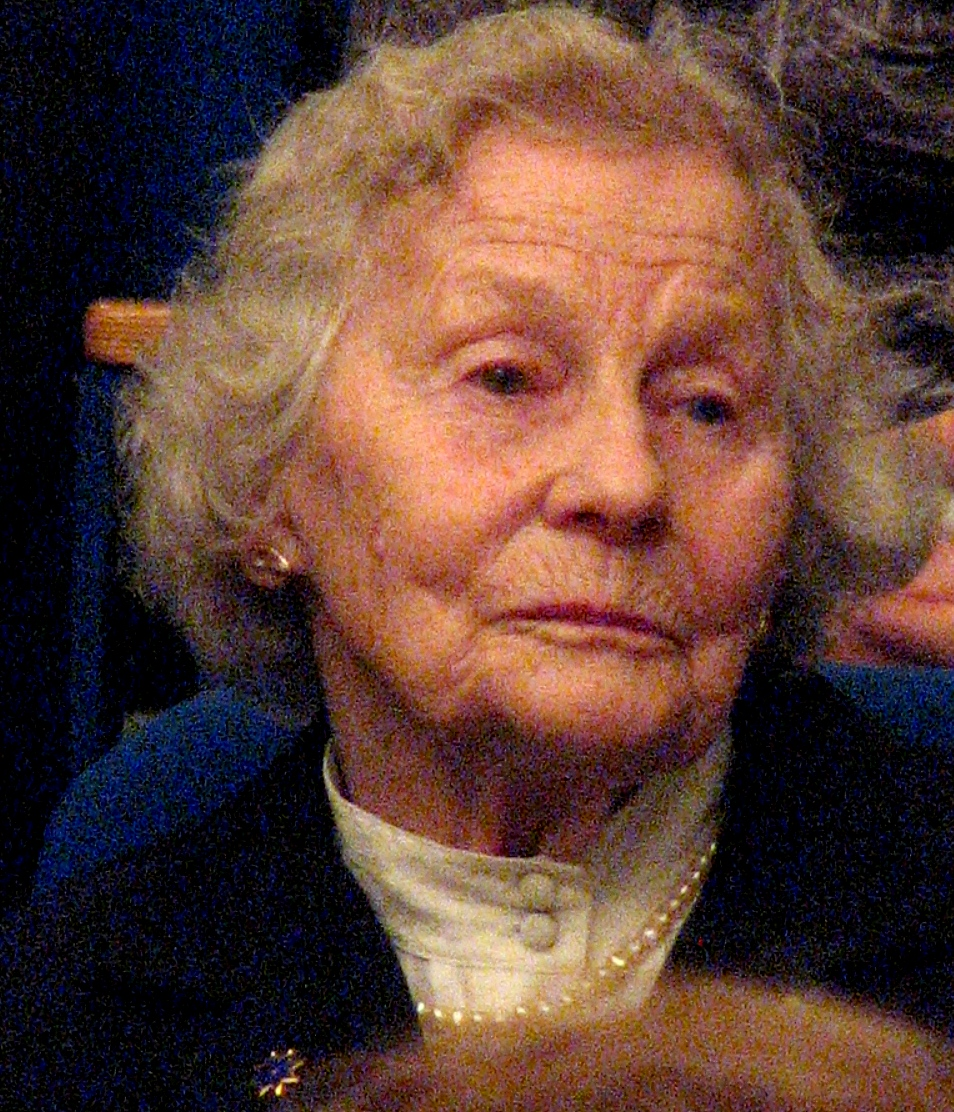
- Born: 14 November 1929; Tallinn, Estonia
- Died: 8 June 2020 (aged 90)
- Resting place: Forest Cemetery, Tallinn
- Occupations: Teacher, translator
- Spouse: Olev Subbi (divorced)
- Parent(s): Arnold Susi; Ella Adelgunde Roost

Heli Susi (Estonian: [ˈhelʲi ˈsusʲi]; 14 November 1929 – 8 June 2020) was an Estonian teacher and translator.

== Early life ==
Heli Susi was born in Tallinn as the youngest child and only daughter of lawyer Arnold Susi, who was the Estonian Minister of Education during Acting Prime Minister Otto Tief's last Government of Estonia before the Soviet troops occupied Estonia during the Second World War in September 1944, and Ella Adelgunde Roost, who was a teacher. Her older brothers were Heino Susi, a writer and a biochemist, and Arno Susi, an economist. She attended the Elfriede Lender Private Gymnasium and Tallinn Secondary School No. 8.

Following the reoccupation of Estonia by the Soviet Union, her father was arrested and placed into the gulag camp-system in 1945. In March 1949, Heli, along with her mother, brother Arno, and grandmother, were forcibly deported by Soviet authorities to Ordzhonikidzevsky District, Khakassia in Siberia during Operation Priboi where they were forced to work as laborers. The family was reunited with Arnold Susi in 1954. During exile in Siberia, she met and married fellow Estonian deportee, artist Olev Subbi. The couple had a son, Juhan, who would become a physicist. After the death of Joseph Stalin and the Khrushchev Thaw, the family were released and permitted to return to Estonia in 1958.

== Career and association with Aleksandr Solzhenitsyn ==
After her return to Estonia, Susi enrolled at the University of Tartu, studying the German language. She later worked as a translator and taught German at the Tallinn Conservatory. Soviet authorities did not permit the family to settle in the larger cities, so the family lived in Kopli-Märdi, near the village of Vasula in Tartu County. Heli's father Arnold, had been incarcerated in Lubyanka prison with Russian author and dissident Aleksandr Solzhenitsyn. After the publication of Solzhenitsyn's One Day in the Life of Ivan Denisovich, the two men reconnected outside of the gulag system. In September 1965, when the KGB seized a significant part of Solzhenitsyn’s literary archive, the unfinished manuscript of The Gulag Archipelago was secretly given to Arnold Susi. Over two winters, between 1965 and 1967, The Gulag Archipelago was completed by Solzhenitsyn in Estonia.

In order to maintain secrecy from authorities, members of the Susi family told their neighbors that Solzhenitsyn was a Moscow professor who was temporarily living at the farm to complete a dissertation. Heli Susi acted as custodian of the manuscripts, hiding them in various places throughout Estonia: the banks of the Ahja river, in the linen closet of a family friend, and the basement of a house in Tartu.

Solzhenitsyn included Heli Susi among the 257 "witnesses of the Archipelago," "whose stories, letters, memoirs, and corrections were used to create this book." He ended the afterword to the book with the words “A complete list of those without whom this book would not have been written, transmitted, not preserved — has not yet come to entrust the paper. They know for themselves. I bow to them."

== Acknowledgements ==
- The Estonian Students' Association, Honorary Member
- Order of the National Coat of Arms, IV Class (2011)
- PEN International, Honorary Member (2018)

In 2019, the Estonian Ministry of Justice created the Heli and Arnold Susi Mission Award for the Courage to Speak Out, which "recognizes individuals who have dared to use the power of their words to stand up for democratic values and human rights."
