= Jakob von Uexküll Centre =

Scientific organization in Estonia

Logo of Jakob von Uexküll Centre

Jakob von Uexküll Centre is an Estonia-based organisation for the work with the legacy of biologist, philosopher and semiotician Jakob von Uexküll. The Centre owns the major archive of his works in the world.

The centre was established in 1993. It is situated in Tartu and attached to the Estonian Naturalists' Society. The Centre co-works with the Department of Semiotics of the University of Tartu.

The centre has an archive with a rich collection of Jakob von Uexküll's publications, correspondence, manuscripts, photos and other materials.

The centre has organised some important conferences on biosemiotics and ecosemiotics. It is also a co-organiser of the series of Jakob von Uexküll lectures.

The centre's Heads have been Toomas Trapido, Timo Maran, Riin Magnus, and others.

== See also ==
- Spring school on theoretical biology
