= George Frederick Harris (geologist) =

English palaeontologist (1862–1906)

George Harris
- Born: 1862; Anglesey, Hampshire
- Died: 1906 (aged 43–44); Thornton Heath, Surrey
- Citizenship: United Kingdom
- Education: King's College; Birkbeck Institution
- Scientific career
- Fields: Geology

George Frederick Harris (13 September 1862 – 16 July 1906) was an English palaeontologist. He was one of the founders of the Malacological Society of London and a Fellow of the Geological Society.

== Education ==
Harris was educated at Netherhampton House School, Wilton, near Salisbury. He subsequently attended classes at King's College, London, and the Birkbeck Institution.

== Works ==
- Catalogue of Tertiary Mollusca in the Department of Geology, British Museum (Natural History). Part 1. The Australasian Tertiary Mollusca. British Museum (Natural History). Department of Geology.
- The Gelinden Beds, Geological Magazine, 1887
- Granites and our Granite Industries, 1888
- The Geology of Gironde, Geological Magazine, 1890
- With Henry William Burrows: The Eocene and Oligocene beds of the Paris basin, 1891
- A Journey through Russia, Geological Magazine, 1898

== Gallery ==
Plates from the Catalogue of Tertiary Mollusca:

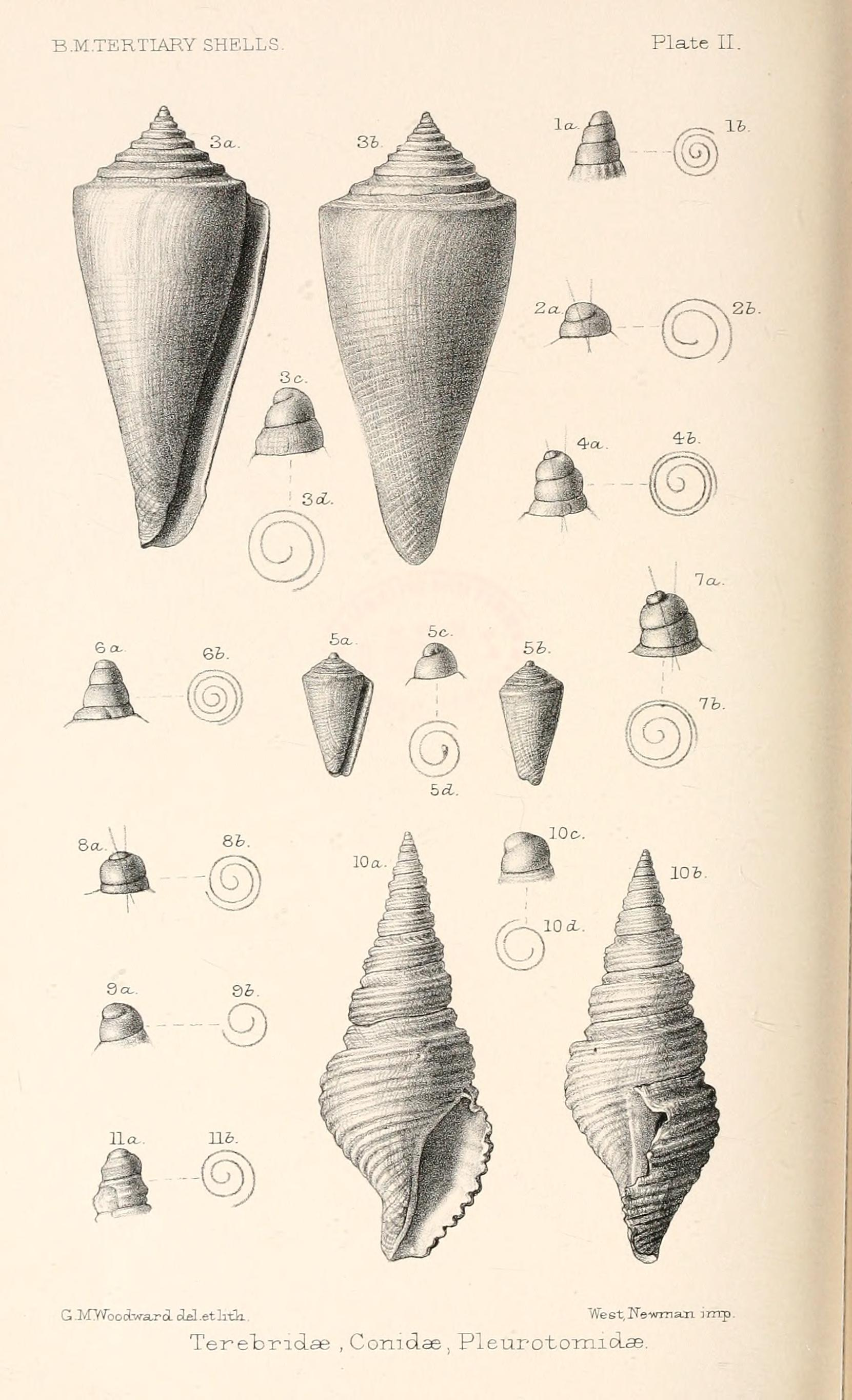
Plate II.

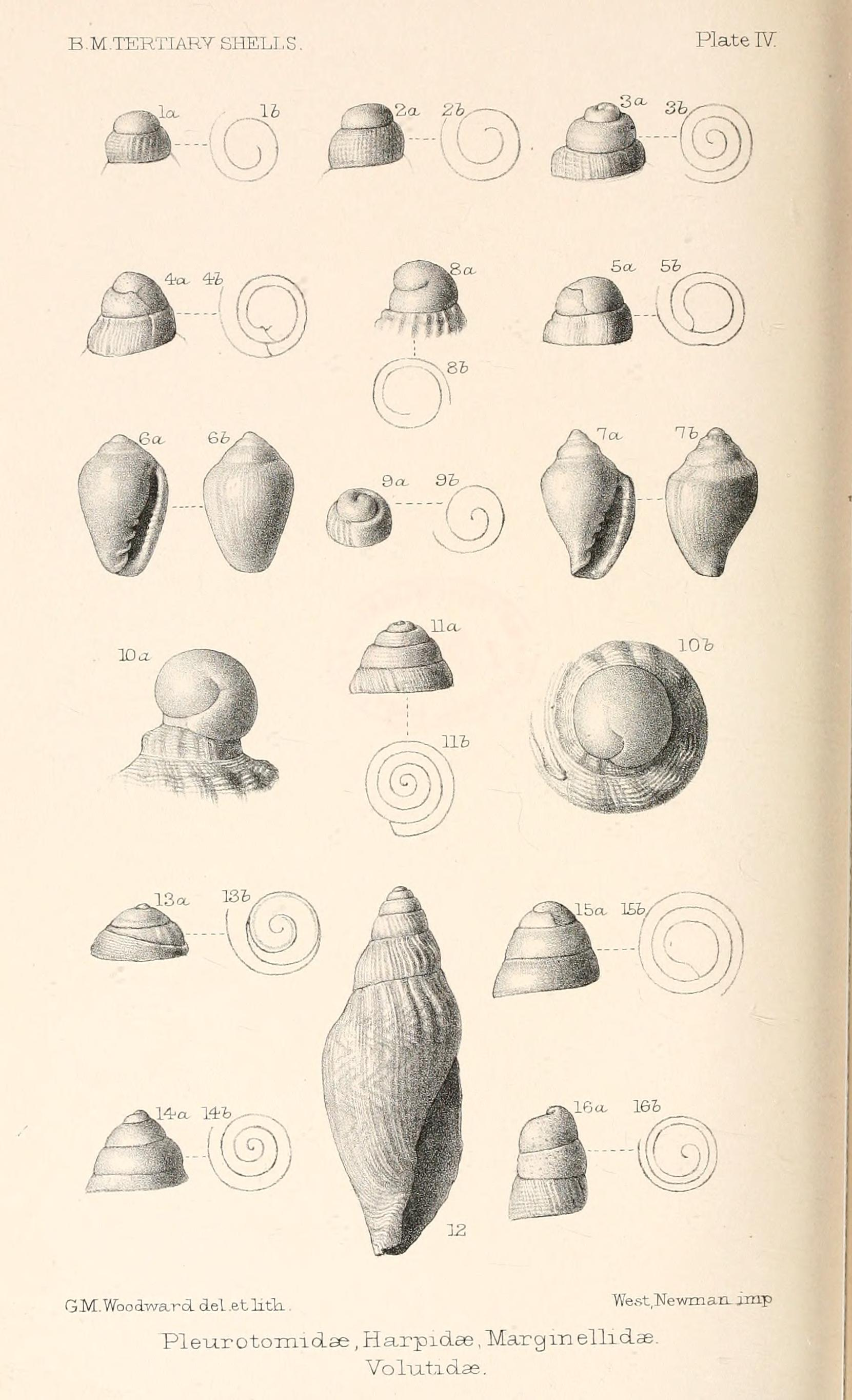
Plate IV.

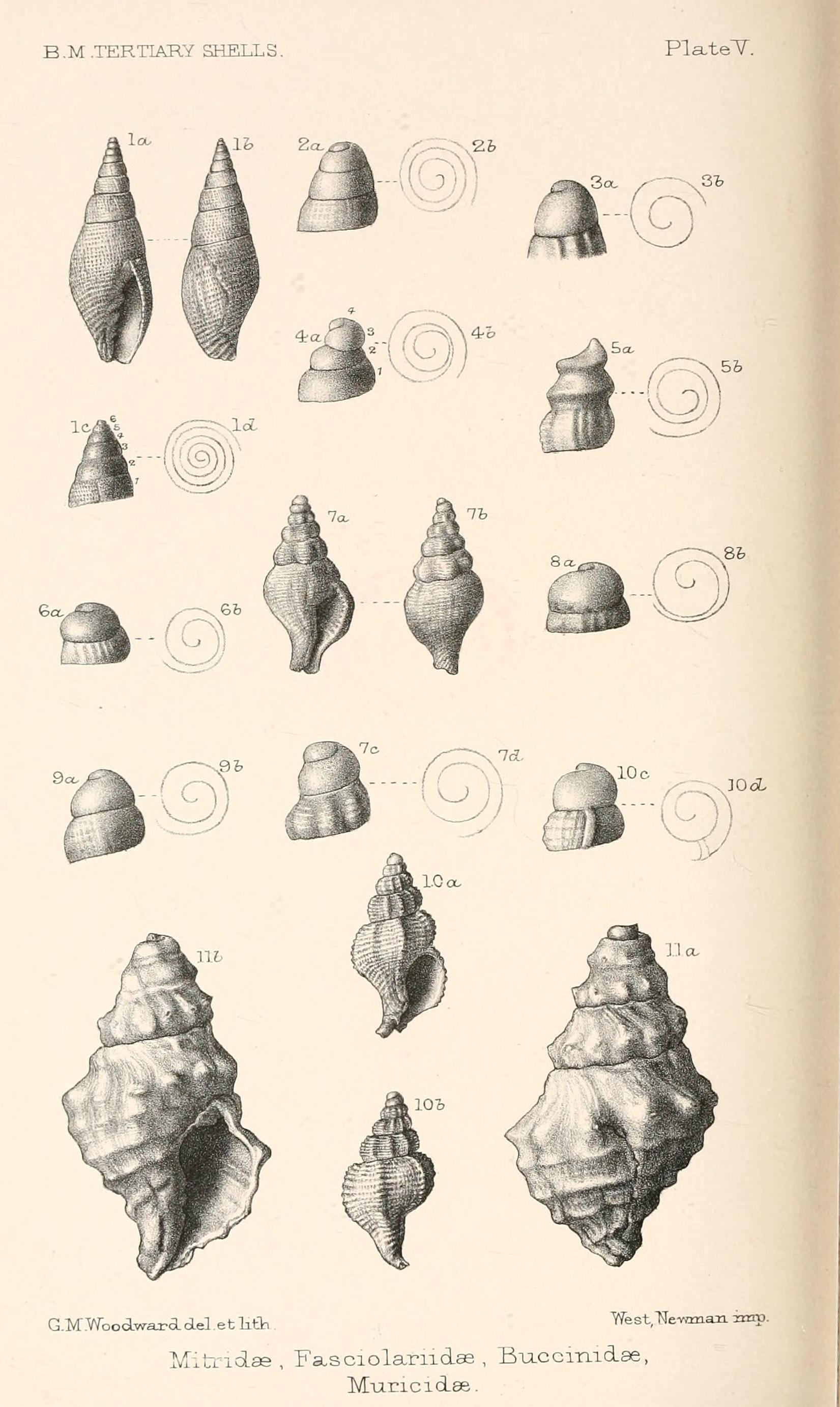
Plate V.

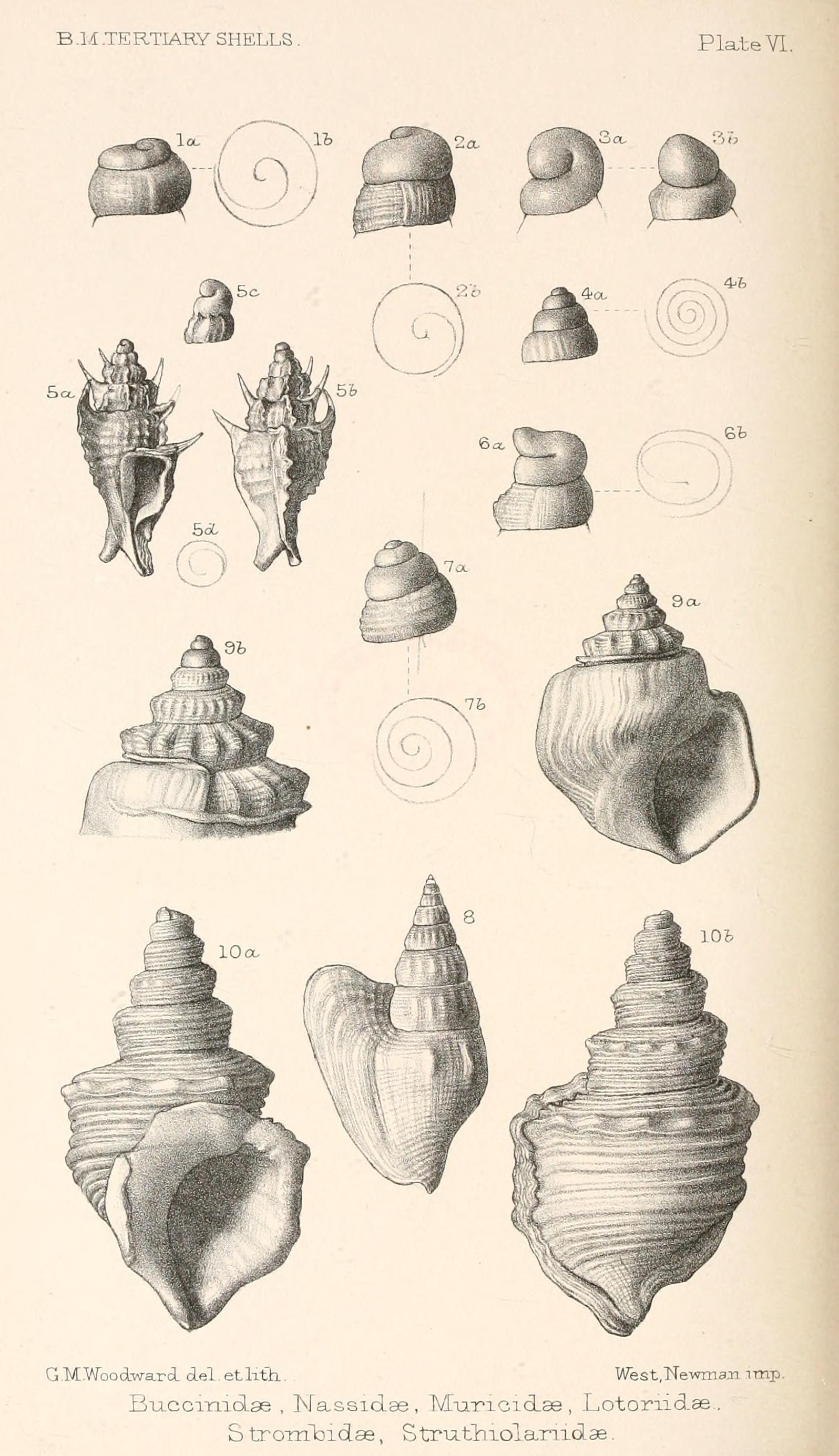
Plate VI.

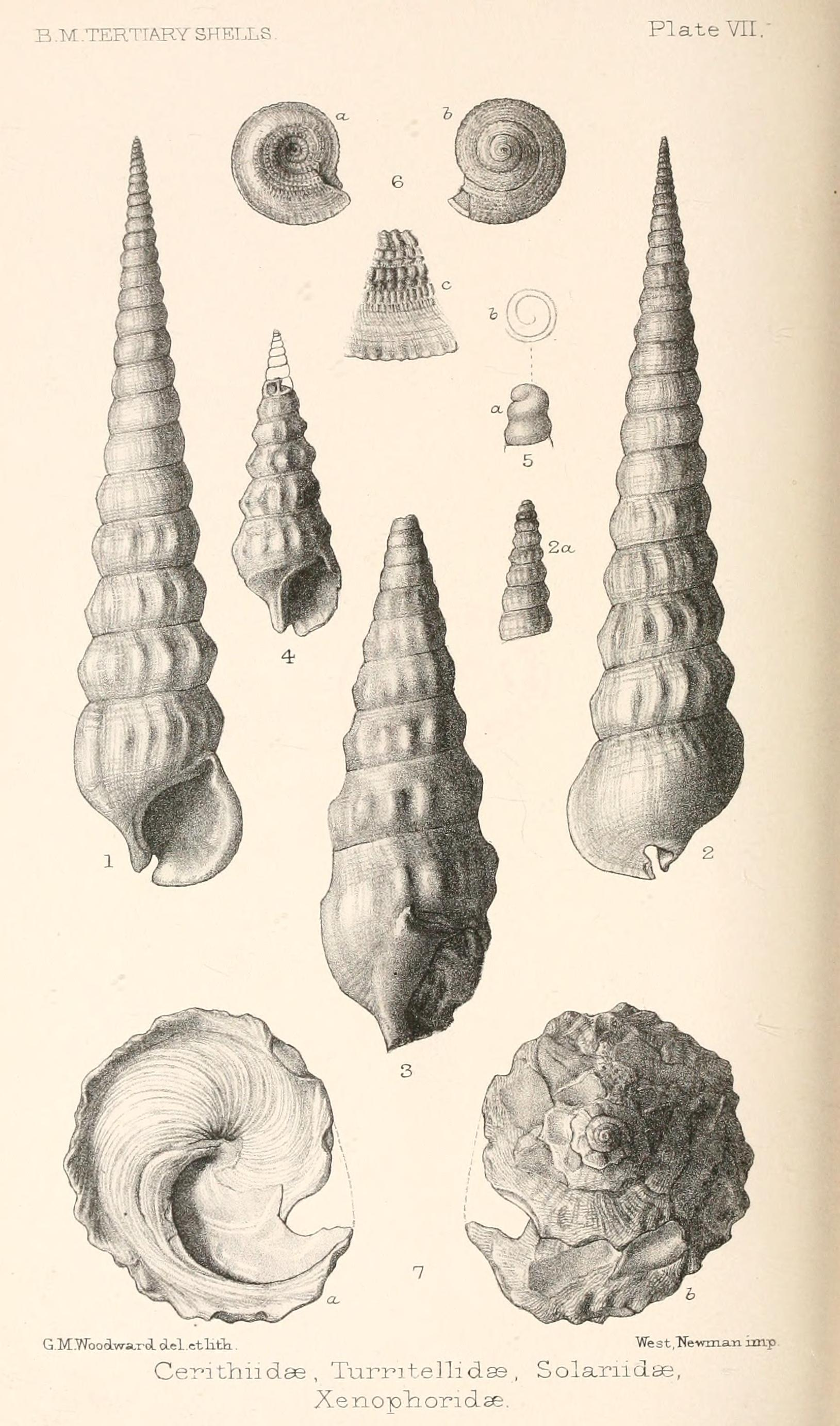
Plate VII.

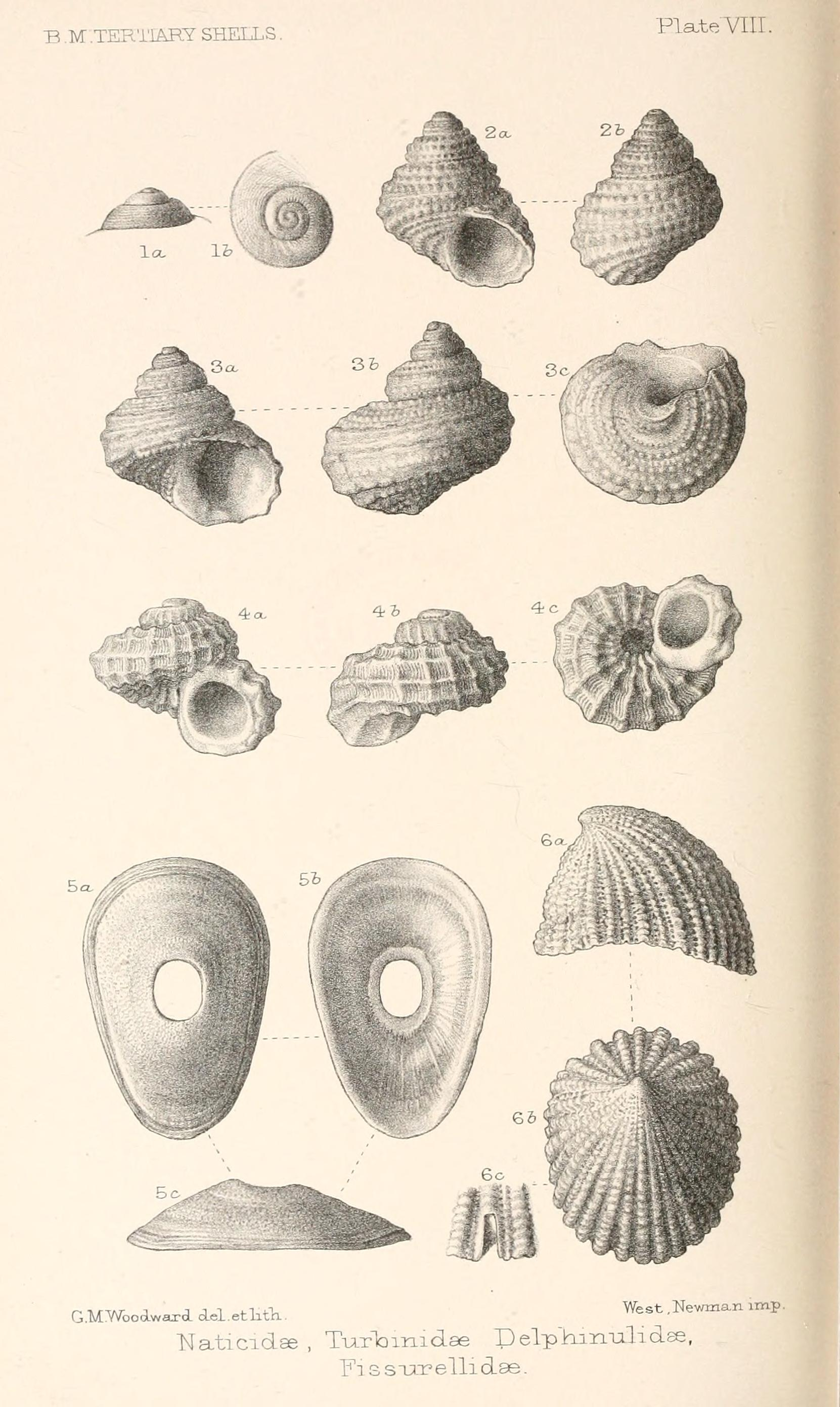
Plate VIII.
