= Lombi =

Lombi may refer to:

- Lombi language (Cameroon)
- Lombi language (DRC)
- Lombi, Tartu County, a village in Estonia
- Pablo Lombi
- Jorge Lombi
