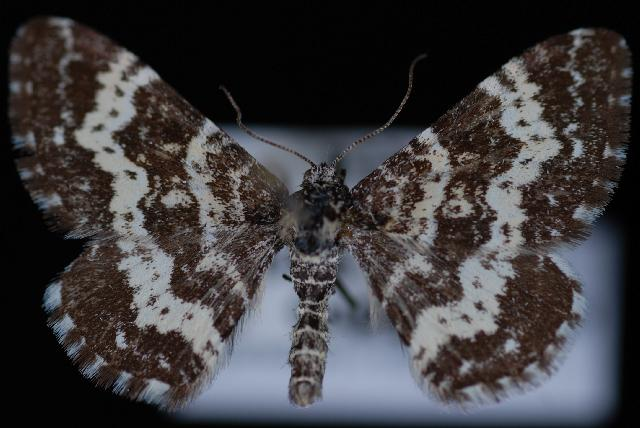

Scientific classification
- Domain: Eukaryota
- Kingdom: Animalia
- Phylum: Arthropoda
- Class: Insecta
- Order: Lepidoptera
- Family: Geometridae
- Tribe: Xanthorhoini
- Genus: Epirrhoe
- Species: E. sperryi

Binomial name
- Epirrhoe sperryi Herbulot, 1951

= Epirrhoe sperryi =

Species of moth

Epirrhoe sperryi, the small argent and sable, is a species of geometrid moth in the family Geometridae. It is found in North America.

The MONA or Hodges number for Epirrhoe sperryi is 7396.
