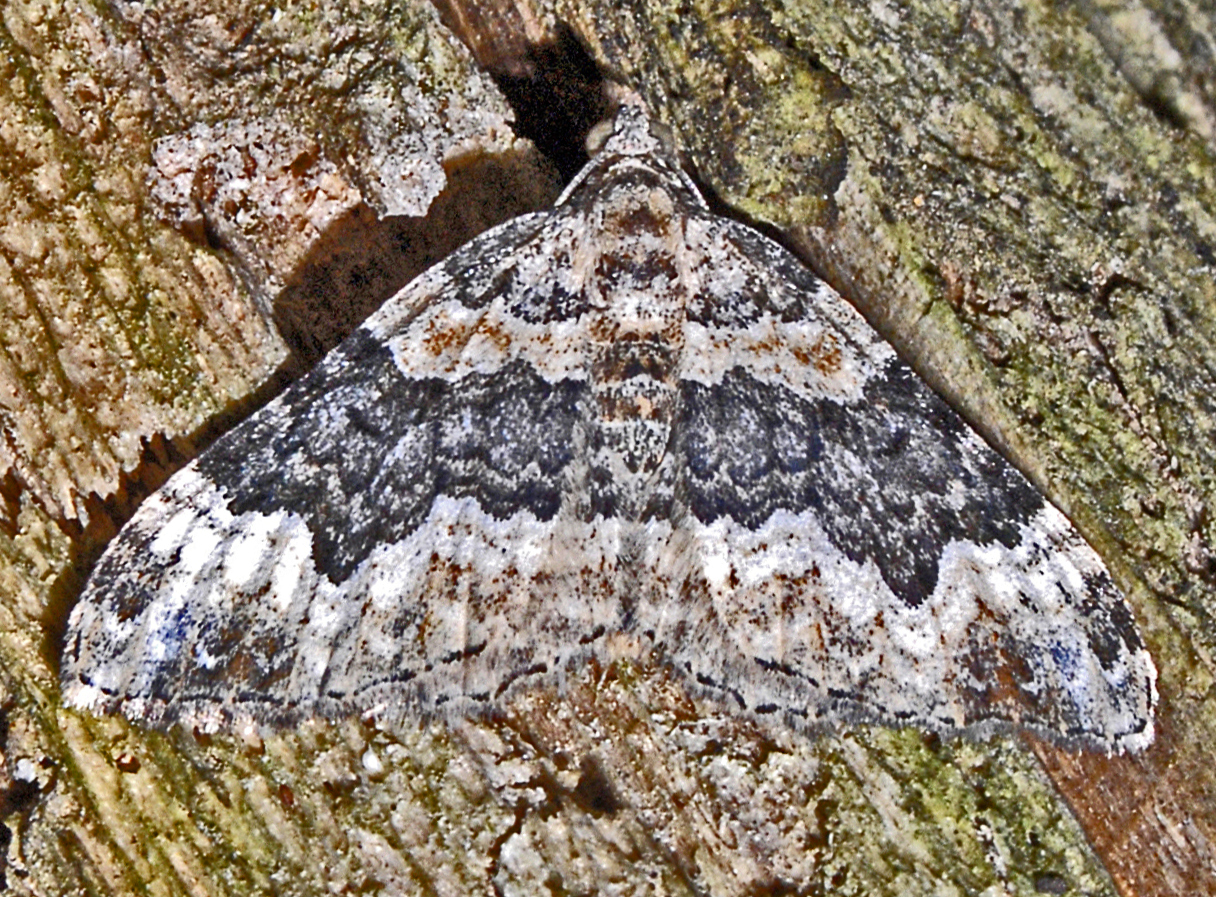
- Epirrhoe galiata. Dorsal view

Scientific classification
- Kingdom: Animalia
- Phylum: Arthropoda
- Class: Insecta
- Order: Lepidoptera
- Family: Geometridae
- Genus: Epirrhoe
- Species: E. galiata

Binomial name
- Epirrhoe galiata (Denis & Schiffermüller, 1775)

Synonyms
- Geometra galiata Denis & Schiffermuller, 1775; Larentia eophanata Krulikovski, 1906

= Epirrhoe galiata =

Species of moth

Epirrhoe galiata, the galium carpet, is a moth of the family Geometridae.

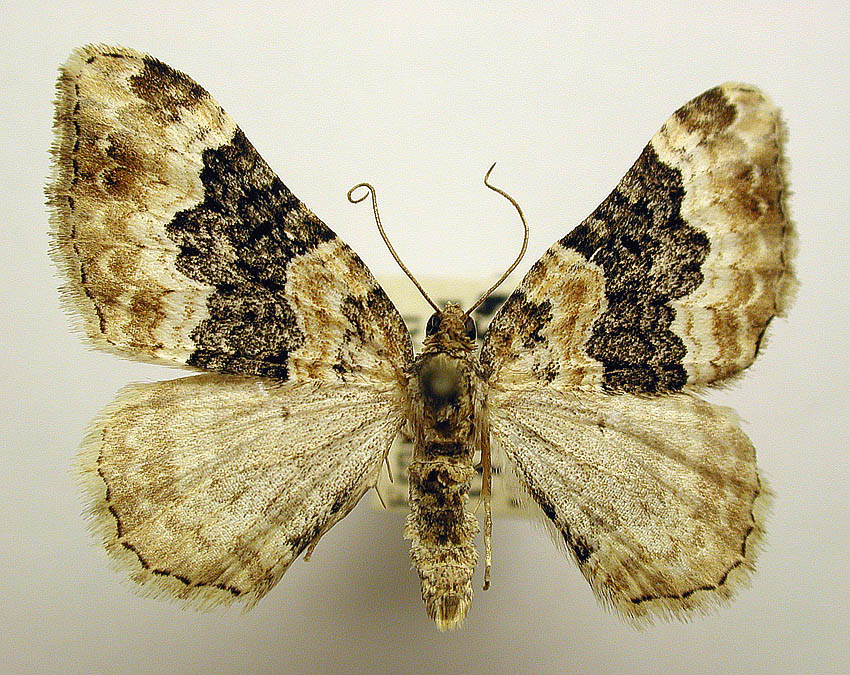
Epirrhoe galiata. Mounted specimen

== Subspecies ==
- Epirrhoe galiata galiata
- Epirrhoe galiata orientata (Staudinger, 1901)
- Epirrhoe galiata eophanata (Krulikowski, 1906)

== Description ==
The wingspan of Epirrhoe galiata can reach about 28–32 mm. The forewing ground colour is pale grey, with a broad, darker bluish-grey central band. The forewings have also small dark grey or bluish-grey stains near the apex. The hindwings are pale whitish-grey and marked with fine crosslines. The larva is naked except for a few short bristles, brown with dark and light longitudinal stripes.

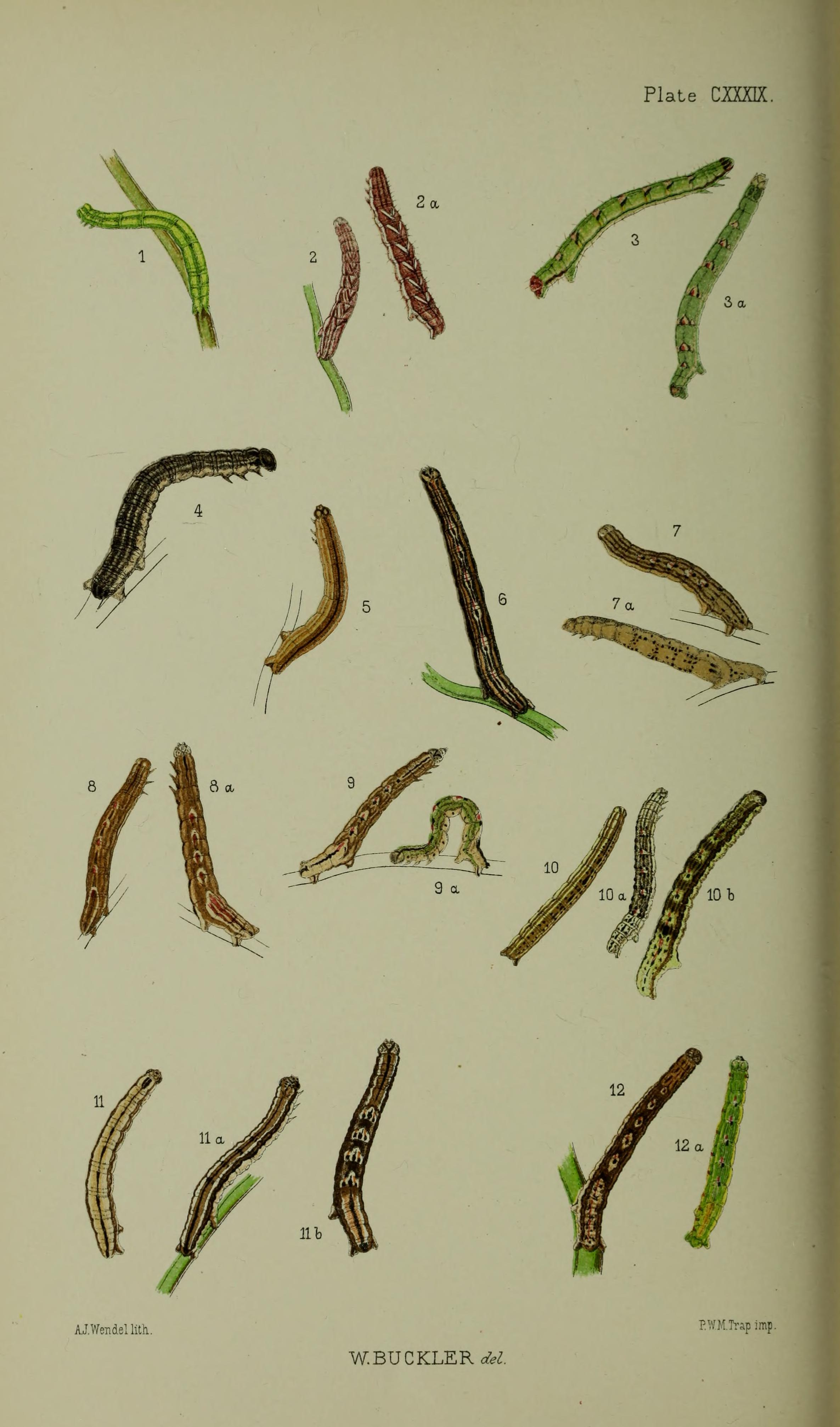
Figs 11, 11a, 11b larvae after final moult

== Biology ==
There are two generations per year with adults on wing from May to September.

The larvae feed on Galium species, including Galium verum and Galium boreale. Larvae can be found from June/July to September/October. Larva overwinters as a pupa.

== Distribution ==
This species can be found from North Africa and western Europe to the Russian Far East.

== Habitat ==
These moths prefer lime and chalk downland, sunny woodland fringes, dry meadows, grassy heathlands, glades, forest clearings, moorlands, sea-cliffs and xerophilous hillsides.
