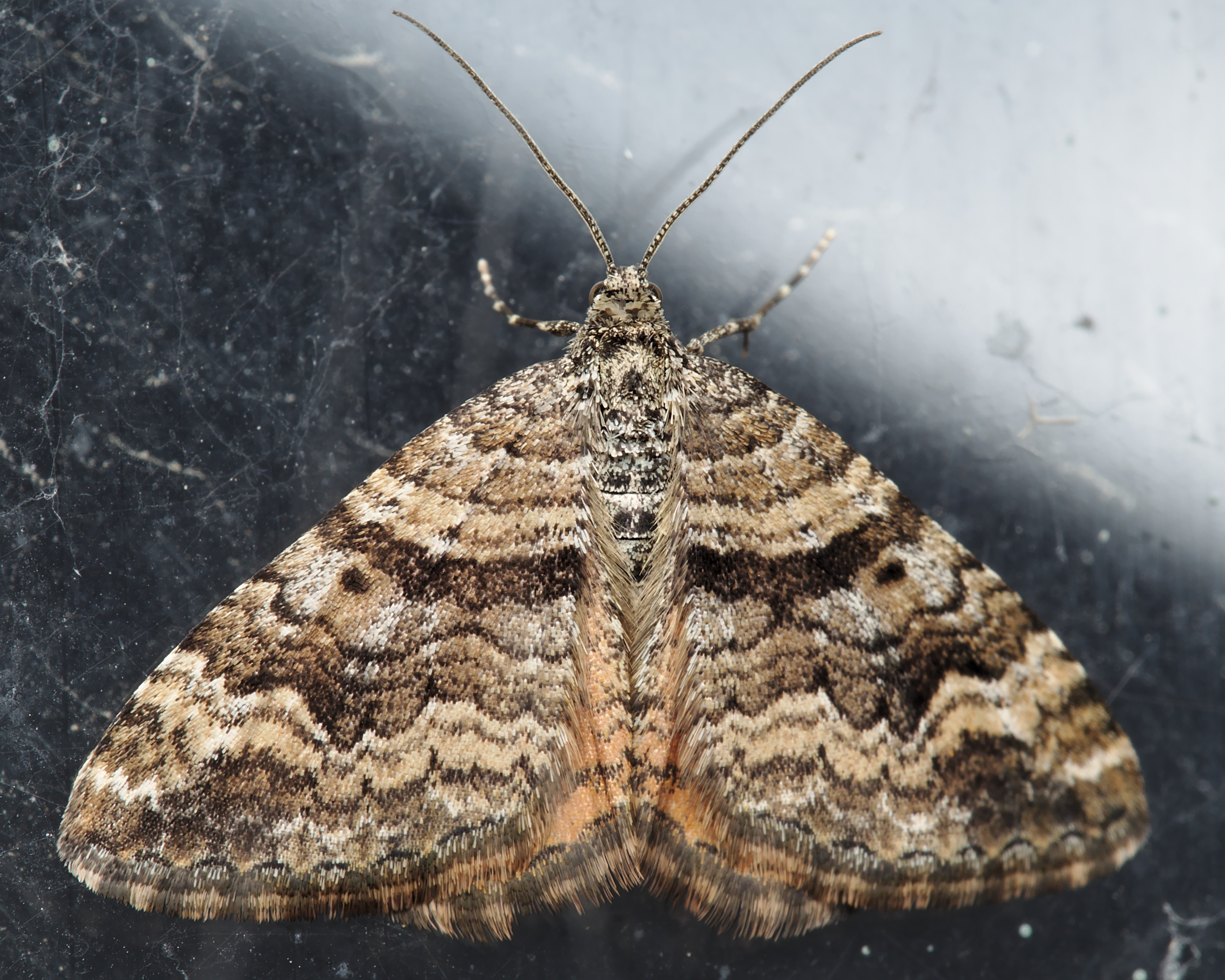
- Epirrhoe plebeculata

Scientific classification
- Kingdom: Animalia
- Phylum: Arthropoda
- Clade: Pancrustacea
- Class: Insecta
- Order: Lepidoptera
- Family: Geometridae
- Tribe: Xanthorhoini
- Genus: Epirrhoe; Hübner, 1825

= Epirrhoe =

Genus of moths

Epirrhoe is a genus of moths in the family Geometridae erected by Jacob Hübner in 1825.

== Species ==
- Epirrhoe alternata (Müller, 1764)
- Epirrhoe dubiosata (Alphéraky, 1883)
- Epirrhoe fulminata (Alphéraky, 1883)
- Epirrhoe galiata (Denis & Schiffermüller, 1775)
- Epirrhoe hastulata (Hübner, 1790)
- Epirrhoe latevittata (Turati, 1913)
- Epirrhoe medeifascia (Grossbeck, 1908)
- Epirrhoe molluginata (Hübner, 1813)
- Epirrhoe plebeculata (Guenée, 1857)
- Epirrhoe pupillata (Thunberg, 1788)
- Epirrhoe rivata (Hübner, [1813])
- Epirrhoe sandosaria (Herrich-Schäffer, 1852)
- Epirrhoe sperryi Herbulot, 1951
- Epirrhoe supergressa (Butler, 1879)
- Epirrhoe tartuensis Möls, 1965
- Epirrhoe timozzaria (Constant, 1884)
- Epirrhoe tristata (Linnaeus, 1758)
