= Arnold Susi =

Estonian writer (1896–1968)

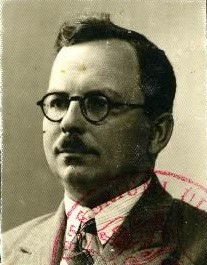
- Arnold Susi,1938
- Born: January 4, 1896; Kuban Oblast, Russian Empire
- Died: May 29, 1968 (aged 72); Tallinn, Estonia
- Resting place: Forest Cemetery, Tallinn
- Occupation: Lawyer
- Known for: The Gulag Archipelago by Aleksandr Solzhenitsyn
- Children: 3, including Heli Susi

Arnold Susi (Estonian: [ˈɑrnolt ˈsusʲi]; 4 January 1896 – 29 May 1968) was a lawyer and the Minister of Education in the Estonian government of Otto Tief established on 18 September 1944 during WWII. In 1945, Susi befriended Aleksandr Solzhenitsyn in a Soviet prison. In the 1960s, when writing The Gulag Archipelago Solzhenitsyn hid at Susi's country house in Estonia. Solzhenitsyn also briefly describes his meeting with Arnold Susi in that book. Susi also wrote his memoirs of World War I in Doom of the Russian Empire (in Estonian: Vene impeeriumi hukk), which he wrote while in Abakan. He died in Tallinn, aged 72.

In 2019, the Estonian Ministry of Justice created the Heli and Arnold Susi Mission Award for the Courage to Speak Out, which recognizes individuals who have dared to use the power of their words to stand up for democratic values and human rights.

Political offices
Preceded by Paul Kogerman	Estonian Minister of Education; 1944	Succeeded by Gustav Suits (didn't take office)
