= Tõnu Möls =

Estonian mathematician and biologist (1939–2019)

Tõnu Möls (12 June 1939 in Tartu – 1 December 2019 ) was an Estonian mathematician and biologist.

In 1965 he described the moth Epirrhoe tartuensis.

From 1994 until 2004, he was the president of Estonian Naturalists' Society.

In 2001, he was awarded with Order of the White Star, V class.
