= Common carpet =

Scientific classification
- Kingdom: Animalia
- Phylum: Arthropoda
- Clade: Pancrustacea
- Class: Insecta
- Order: Lepidoptera
- Family: Geometridae
- Genus: Epirrhoe
- Species: E. alternata

Binomial name
- Epirrhoe alternata (O. F. Müller, 1764)

Species of moth

The common carpet or white-banded toothed carpet (Epirrhoe alternata) is a moth of the family Geometridae. The species was first described by Otto Friedrich Müller in 1764. It is found throughout the Palearctic and the Near East. In North America it ranges across the northern tier of the United States plus every province and territory of Canada.

== Description ==
The wingspan is 27–30 mm. The forewings vary from grey to black, marked with white fascia, giving a striped appearance. The forewings are patterned grey at the base of the wings, after a narrow light fascia comes a wide, brown patterned band, which is followed by an almost pure, light band. Beyond it, on the outer edge of the wings, the wings are again dark brown and grey patterned. The outer dark fascia is intersected throughout its length by a grey line.The hindwings are paler grey with white fascia. Northern races tend to be paler overall.

The central fascia varies in width; it is often contracted below the middle, sometimes completely severed at this point, and in ab. degenerata, Haworth, both portions are much reduced in width. There are brownish-grey examples from the Isle of Lewis; these are var. obscurata, South. There are intermediate modifications leading up to a form in which the whole of the central third of the fore wings is whitish, with the usual cross lines dingy grey, and some tiny clouds of the same colour around the black discal spot.

The larva is generally brown or green but is very variable in its markings. It feeds on bedstraw. The species overwinters as a pupa.

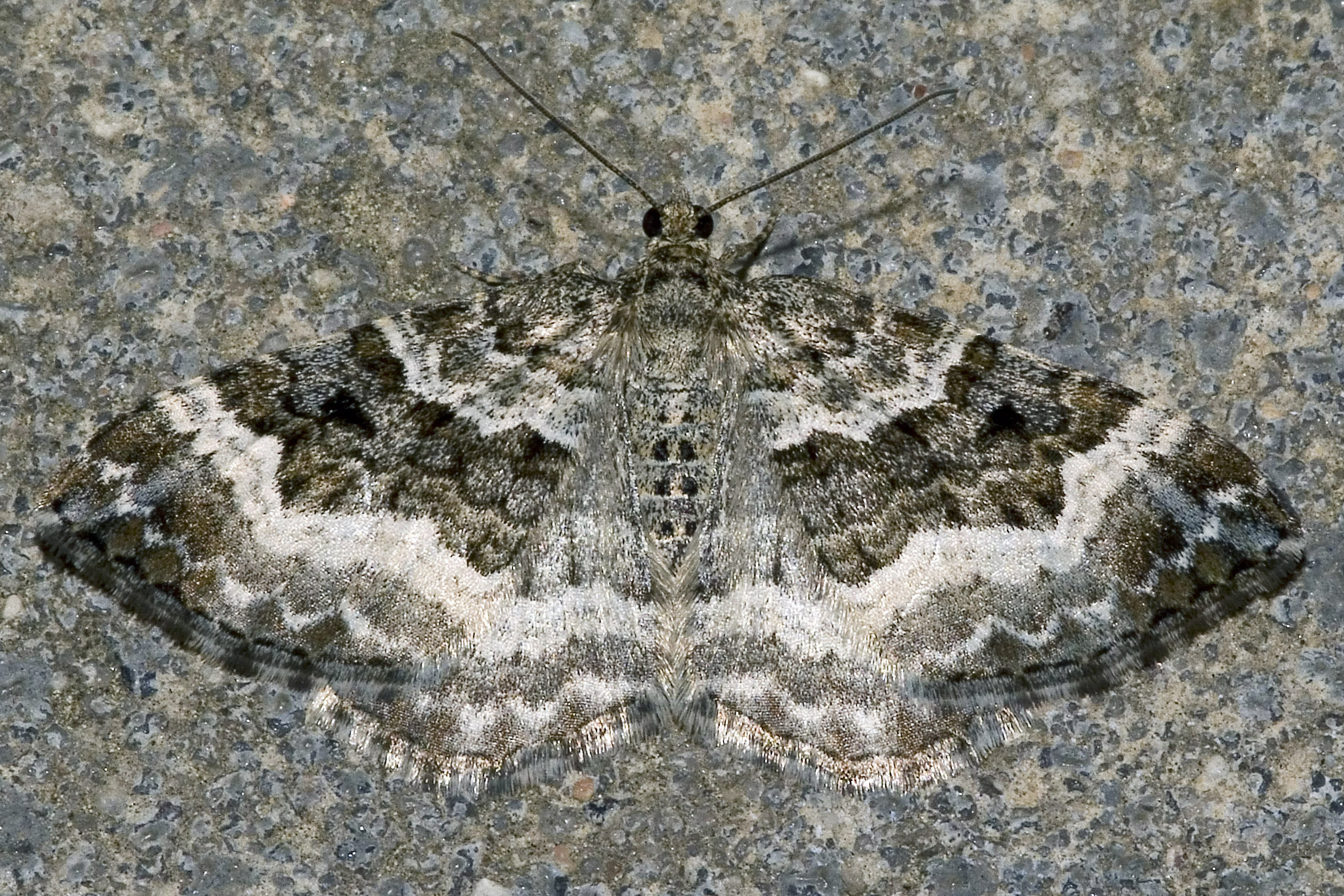
Adult

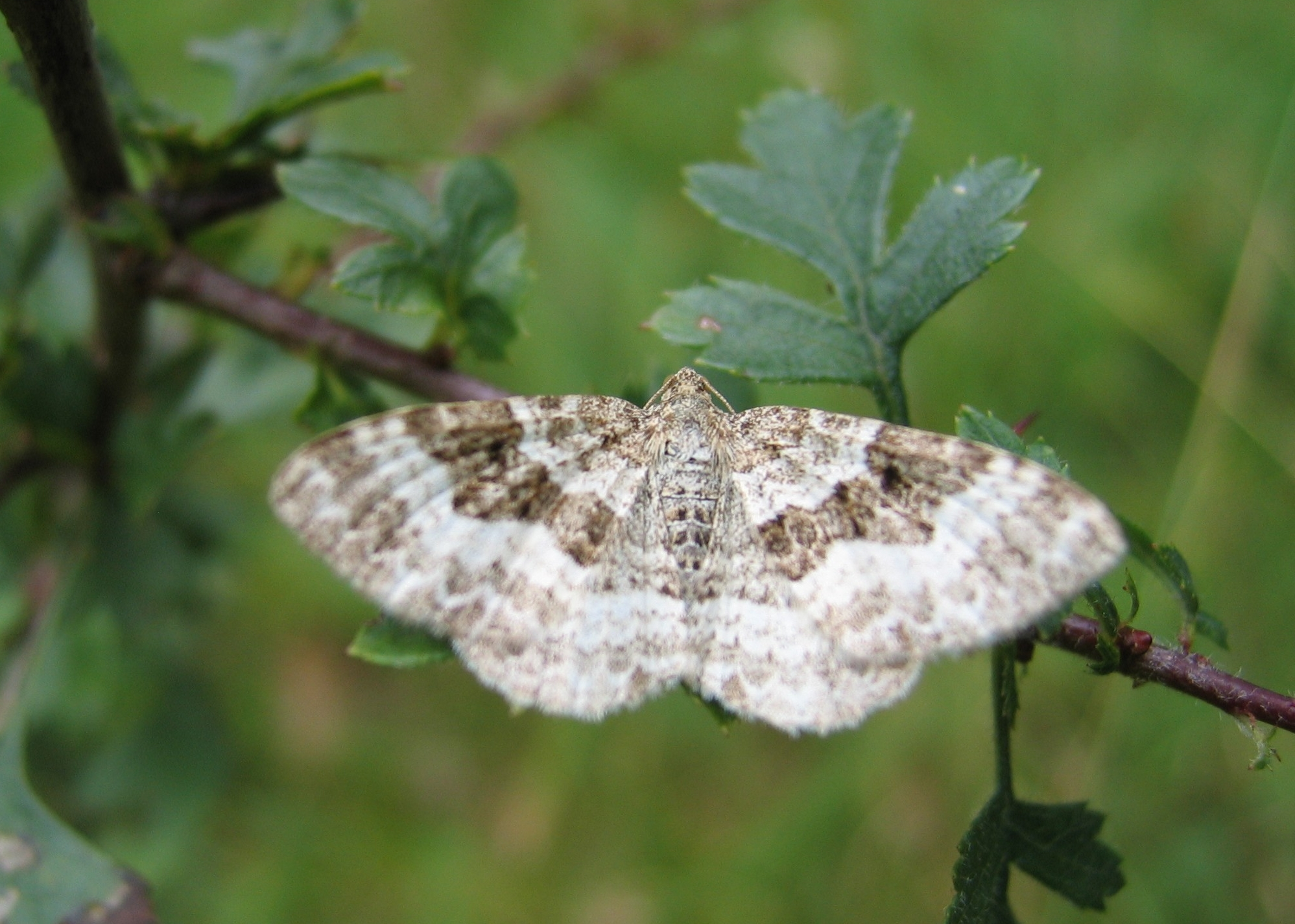
Adult

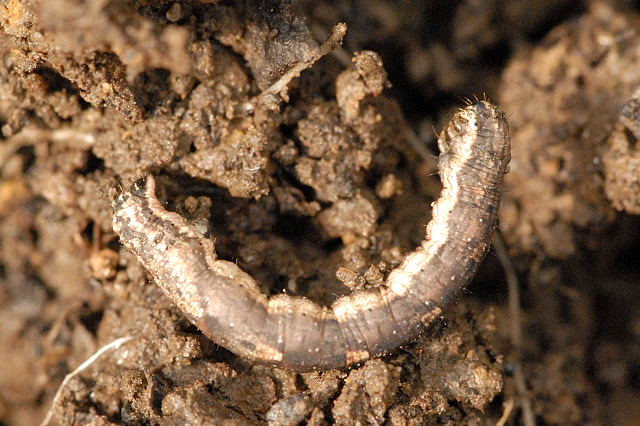
Larva

== Ecology ==
One or two broods are produced each year, and the adults may be seen any time from May to September. The species flies at night and is attracted to light.

1. The flight season refers to the British Isles. This may vary in other parts of the range.
