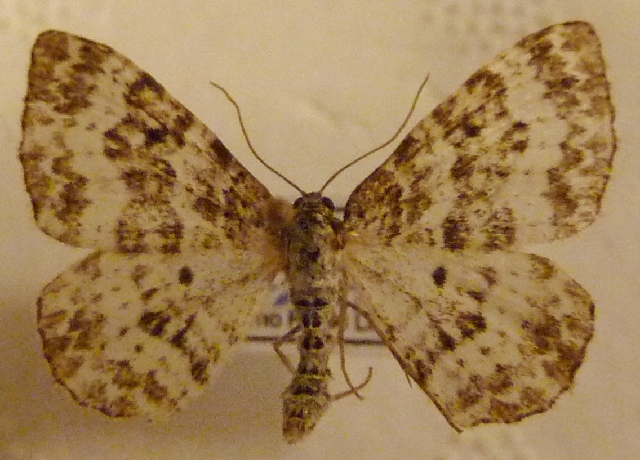

Scientific classification
- Domain: Eukaryota
- Kingdom: Animalia
- Phylum: Arthropoda
- Class: Insecta
- Order: Lepidoptera
- Family: Geometridae
- Genus: Epirrhoe
- Species: E. tartuensis

Binomial name
- Epirrhoe tartuensis Möls, 1965

= Epirrhoe tartuensis =

Species of moth

Epirrhoe tartuensis is a moth of the family Geometridae. It is known from Finland, the Baltic States and adjacent Russia.

The wingspan is about 24–29 mm. Adults are on wing from June to July.

The larvae feed on Galium species. Larvae can be found from mid June to August. It overwinters as a pupa.
