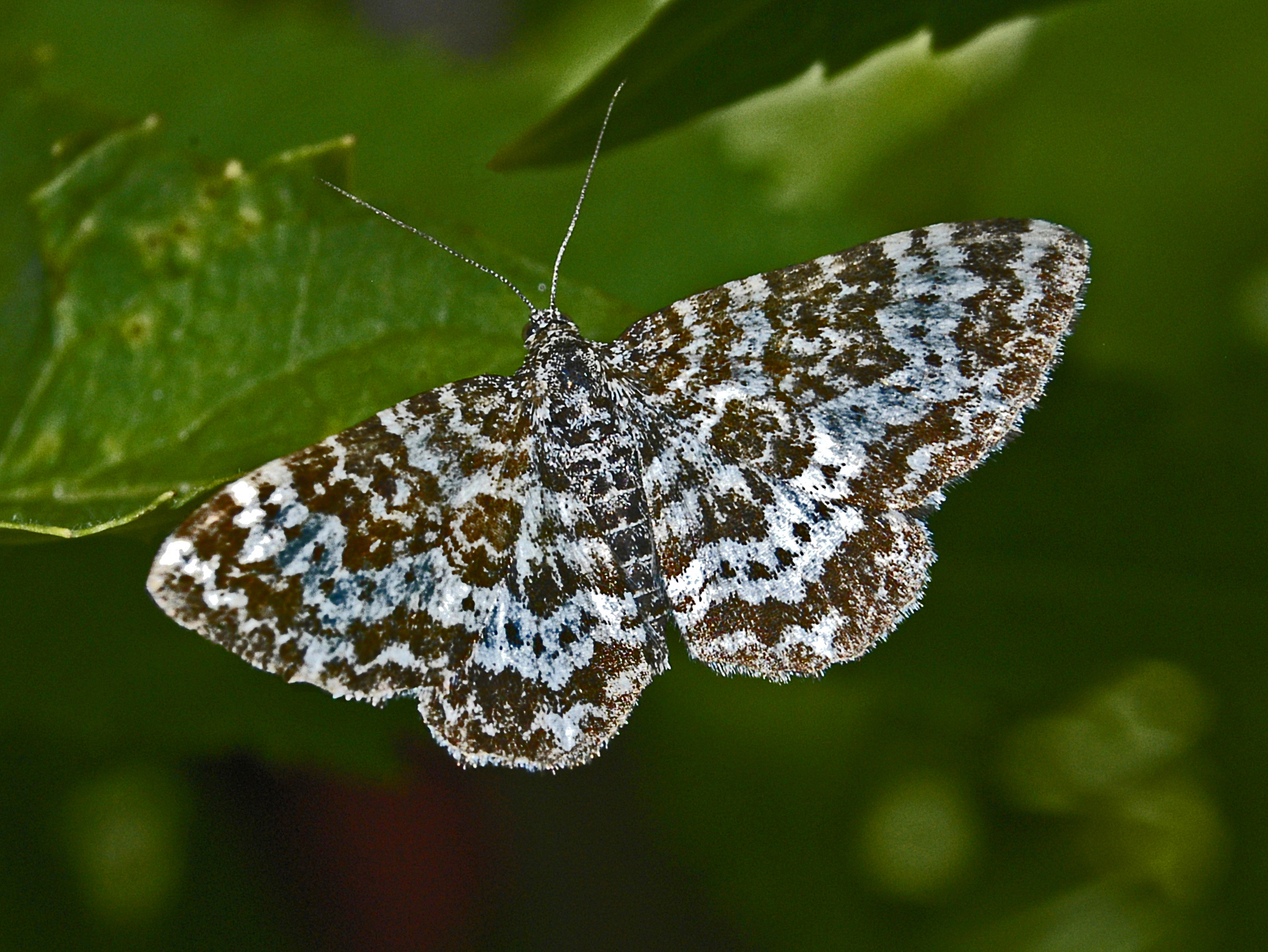
- Epirrhoe cf. hastulata
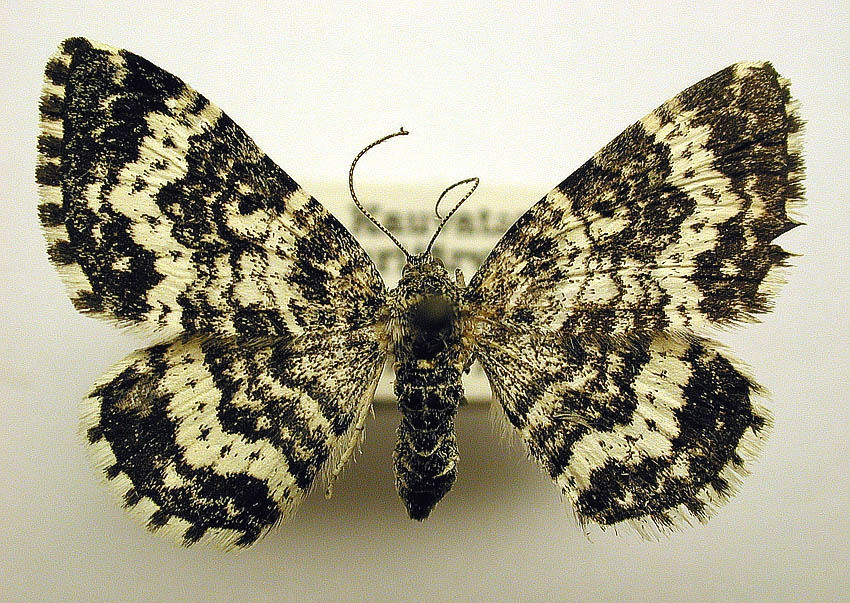
- Epirrhoe hastulata. Mounted specimen

Scientific classification
- Domain: Eukaryota
- Kingdom: Animalia
- Phylum: Arthropoda
- Class: Insecta
- Order: Lepidoptera
- Family: Geometridae
- Genus: Epirrhoe
- Species: E. hastulata

Binomial name
- Epirrhoe hastulata (Hübner, 1790)

Synonyms
- Phalaena hastulata Hubner, 1790; Geometra luctuata Hubner, 1799

= Epirrhoe hastulata =

Species of moth

Epirrhoe hastulata is a moth of the family Geometridae.

== Subspecies ==
- Epirrhoe hastulata hastulata
- Epirrhoe hastulata reducta (Djakonov, 1929)

== Distribution ==
This species is known from Europe, from the area between northern Scandinavia and the Alps, through the Caucasus and central Asia to the Kamchatka Peninsula and the Kuril Islands.

== Description ==
The wingspan is about 19–22 mm. Background of the wings is dark gray, with white markings and a narrow white transverse bands on the forewings. The fringes along the wing edge alternate black and white. Body is black with small white rings between the various segments.

== Biology ==
Adults are on wing from May to June. The larvae feed on Galium species, including Galium verum. Larvae can be found from July to August. It overwinters as a pupa.
