= Estonian Malacological Society =

Organization based in Estonia

Estonian Malacological Society (Eesti Malakoloogia Ühing) is an Estonia-based society concerned with the study of molluscs. It was founded in 1996. It is a branch of the Estonian Naturalists' Society. The organization participated in Operation MegaLab, a Europe-wide survey of land snails, in 2009. It also has issued press releases to warn Estonians about the arrival in the country of invasive snail species that are garden pests.

== See also ==
- Malacological Society of London
