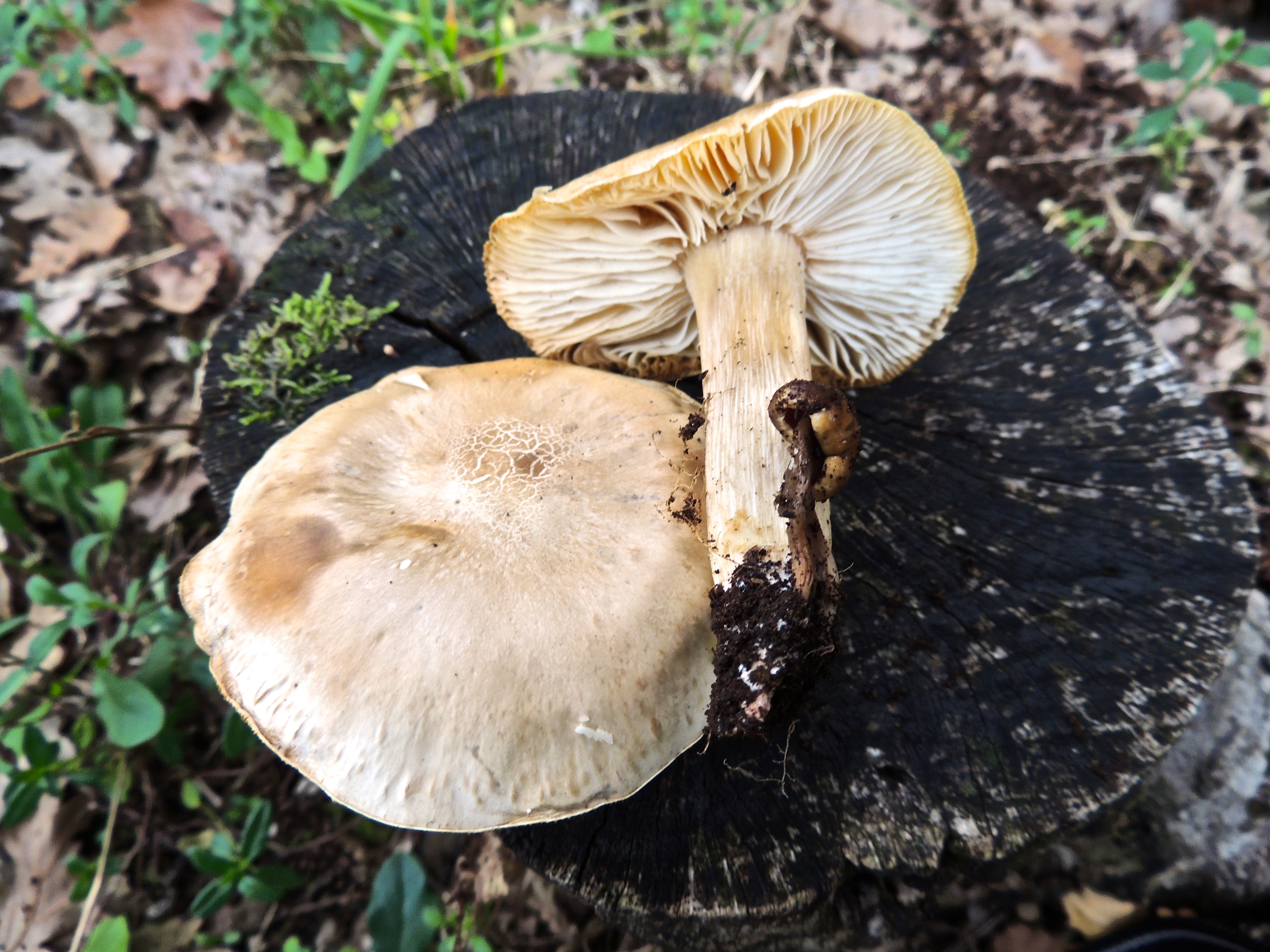

Scientific classification
- Kingdom: Fungi
- Division: Basidiomycota
- Class: Agaricomycetes
- Order: Agaricales
- Family: Lyophyllaceae
- Genus: Tricholomella; Zerova ex Kalamees (1992)

Type species
- Tricholomella constricta (Fr.) Zerova ex Kalamees (1992)

Synonyms
- Tricholomella Zerova (1979); Echinosporella Contu (1992)

= Tricholomella =

Single-species fungal genus

Tricholomella is a fungal genus in the family Lyophyllaceae. The genus is monotypic, containing the single species Tricholomella constricta, described as new to science by the Ukrainian mycologist Mariya Yakovlevna Zerova in 1979. Zerova's original publication was invalid, and it was later republished validly by Kuulo Kalamees in 1992. The fungus is found in Asia and Europe.

== Taxonomy ==
The presence or absence of siderophilous granulation (iron-staining granules) in the basidia (soire-bearing cells) has been a point of contention in the taxonomic placement of Tricholomella. While this characteristic would suggest attribution to genera like Lyophyllum or Calocybe, Zerova (1979) denied the presence of such granulation in Tricholomella. This character has also presented problems in other genera such as Hypsizygus and is considered by some mycologists to be an unreliable taxonomic feature.

== Description ==
Tricholomella constricta is a white, fleshy mushroom of small to medium size, typically with a cap measuring 3–6 cm in diameter. The fruiting bodies are tricholomatoid, meaning they have a general appearance similar to species in the genus Tricholoma. Young specimens have a pure white and pruinose (covered with a powder-like bloom) cap that is convex to convex-campanulate (bell-shaped). As the mushroom matures, the cap becomes convex-plane to plane, sometimes developing an obtuse umbo. The centre may become slightly brownish, yellowish or greyish with age. The cap surface is silky, shiny, smooth and dry.

The gills (lamellae) are white, occasionally developing a pinkish tinge, and are crowded, large, and emarginate (notched where they meet the stipe) to almost free. The stipe is white, dry, and fibrillose-floccose (covered with small tufts of fibres) when young. Initially, it features a narrow membranaceous ring at the apex which quickly disappears. The mature stipe becomes fibrillose, smooth, cylindric or slightly tapered at the base, and sometimes develops a rooting base. It typically measures 2–5 cm in length and 1–1.5 cm in thickness. The mushroom has a white veil which is membranaceous and quickly disappears as the fruiting body matures. The flesh is white and thick. Both the smell and taste are strongly mealy.

Microscopically, T. constricta produces a white spore print. The spores are ellipsoid to oval, distinctly echinulate (covered with small spines or projections), and relatively large, measuring 7–10 × 4–6 μm. They are hyaline (transparent), inamyloid (not staining blue-black with iodine solutions), and cyanophilous (staining with certain blue dyes). The basidia (spore-producing cells) are 4-spored. Hymenial cystidia (sterile cells in the spore-bearing layer) are absent. The epicutis is not cellular, the hyphae have clamp connections, and the hymenophoral trama (tissue within the gills) has a regular cellular arrangement.

== Habitat and distribution ==
Tricholomella constricta inhabits deciduous and mixed forests, steppes, meadows, and pastures throughout Eastern Europe and Asia, fruiting from June to October. This rare species has been documented in Estonia (seven localities), Latvia, Ukraine, Kazakhstan, and Russia (Kirov Oblast, Leningrad Oblast, and Primorsky Krai in the Far East).
