= Loodus =

Estonian publishing company

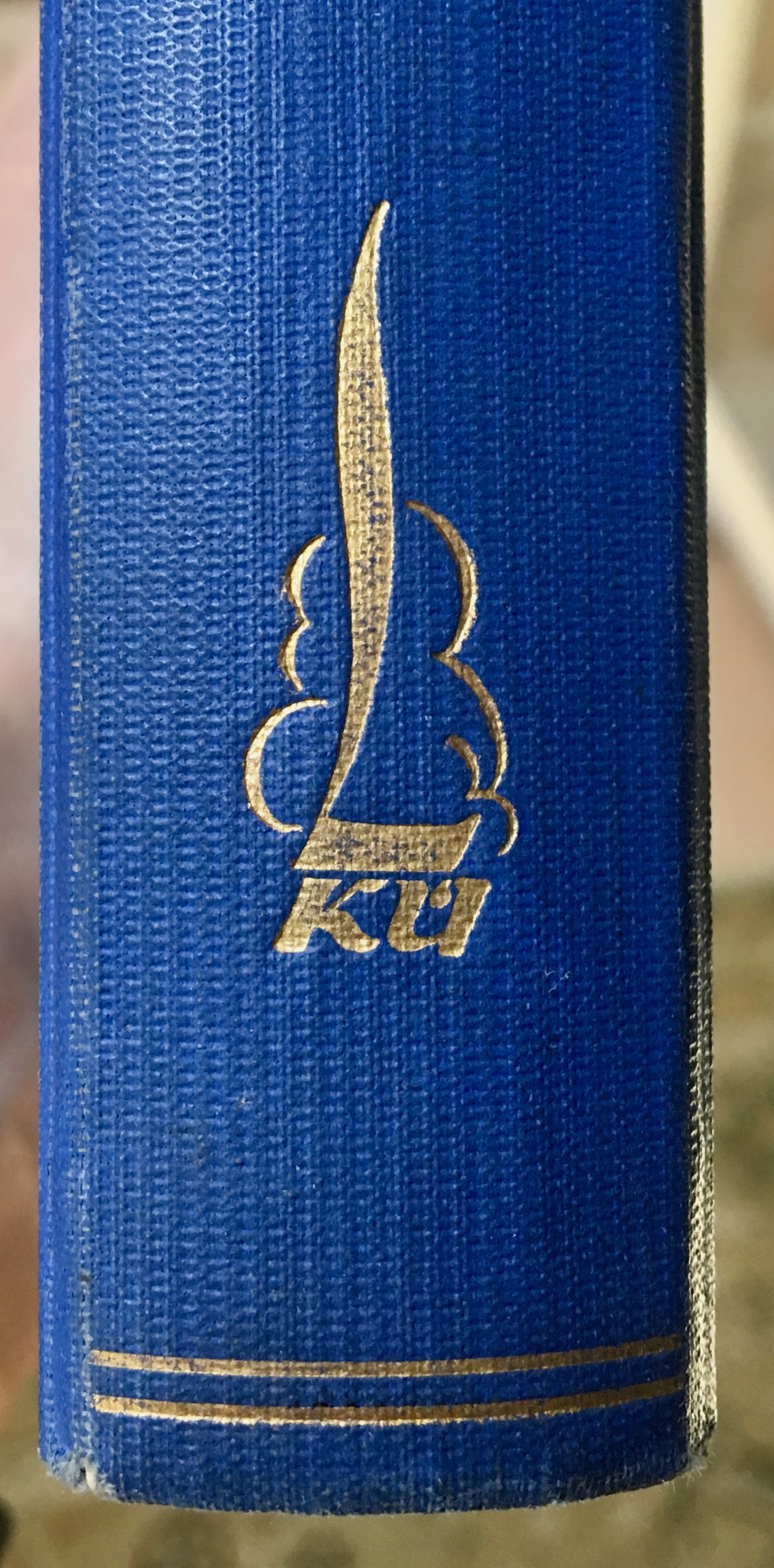
Logo

Loodus was an Estonian publishing company located in Tartu, Estonia. It was the largest publishing company in Estonia in the 20th century.

The company was established by Aleksander Audova, Hans Männik, Johannes Piiper, August Reeben, Jaan Rumma, and Johannes Voldemar Veski.

By the end of the 1930s, the company's stocks were shared among 300 owners.

Published series: "Nobeli laureaadid", "Kirjasõna suurmeistrid", "Looduse kuldraamat".

During its existence, the company published over 2,000 books.
