= Paul Kogerman =

Estonian chemist (1891–1951)

Paul Nikolai Kogerman
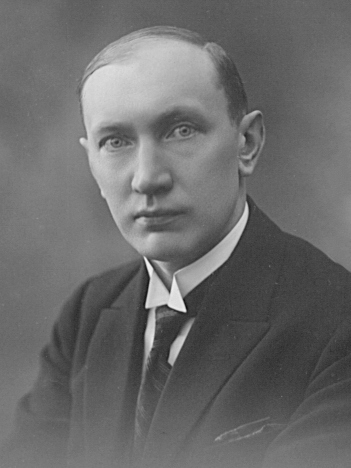
- Born: 5 December 1891; Tallinn, Governorate of Estonia, Russian Empire
- Died: 27 July 1951 (aged 59); Tallinn, then part of Estonian SSR, Soviet Union
- Citizenship: Estonian
- Education: University of Tartu; Imperial College London; ETH Zurich
- Known for: Research in oil shale
- Awards: Légion d'honneur (1927); Order of the White Star (1938)
- Scientific career
- Fields: Chemist
- Workplaces: University of Tartu; Tallinn University of Technology

Paul Nikolai Kogerman (5 December [O.S. 23 November] 1891 in Tallinn – 27 July 1951 in Tallinn) was an Estonian chemist and founder of modern research in oil shale.

Paul Kogerman was born into a family of gas factory worker (and former sailor). He went to an elementary school in 1901–1904 and a town school in 1904–1908. After town school Kogerman earned a living by teaching in church manors near Tallinn. In 1913, he was graduated from the Alexander Gymnasium in Tallinn (Reval) as an extern. Starting in 1913, he studied at the University of Tartu, graduating from its Department of Chemistry in 1918. In the Estonian War of Independence he fought in a unit of Tallinn teachers. In 1919–1920 he got a state scholarship to study at the Imperial College London. In May 1921 he was given a qualification of chemical technologist by the University of London and in 1922 he received the degree of Master of Sciences.

== Career ==
From 1921 to 1936, Kogerman was active at the University of Tartu. After the defence of his Master's thesis on the thermal decay of oil-shale, he was elected docent of Organic Chemistry of the University in 1922. He went on to become extraordinary professor in 1924 and full professor in 1925. In 1926 and 1933 he was guest lecturer at the ETH Zürich and in 1927–1928 at Harvard University. In 1934, he defended, in Zürich, his doctoral thesis on the combining and polymerization reactions of the isolated double bond dienes.

From 1936 to 1941 Kogerman was professor of organic chemistry at the Tallinn University of Technology, in 1936–1939 he was also a rector of the University. In 1938, Kogerman was selected to the newly established Estonian Academy of Sciences and in 1946 reselected after re-establishment of the Academy as the Academy of Sciences of the Estonian Soviet Socialist Republic. He was the president of the Estonian Naturalists' Society in 1929–1936.

Paul Kogerman

22nd Estonian Minister of Education
- In office 1939–1940
- Preceded by: Aleksander Jaakson
- Succeeded by: Johannes Semper

In 1938–1939 Kogerman was ex officio member of the National Council (Riiginõukogu). From October 1939 until the Soviet occupation of Estonia on 21 June 1940 Kogerman served as Minister of Public Education.

In 1941 Kogerman, together with his family, was deported by Soviet authorities to the prisoner camp in Sverdlovsk Oblast. He was prematurely released and allowed to return to Estonia in 1945. From 1945 to 1951 he was director of the chair for organic chemistry at Tallinn University of Technology. From 1947 to 1950 he served also as the director of the Chemistry Institute of the Academy of Sciences.

== Honors ==
In 1927 Kogerman was decorated with the insignia of the Légion d'honneur and in 1938 with the Second Class of the Order of the White Star. In 2006 the Paul Kogerman scholarship was founded, to be granted to successful master's and doctoral level students of the Faculties of Science and Chemical and Materials Technology of the Tallinn University of Technology.

== Significance ==
Paul Kogerman won international reputation with his work on oil shale. He initiated systematic research of oil shale and its products by establishing, together with professor Michael Wittlich, a laboratory to study oil-bearing shales in 1925. Kogerman submitted fundamental work on the structure and origin of oil shale and its chemical characteristics, as well as work on thermal processes.

== Publications ==
- Kogerman, Paul N. (1922). The Chemical Composition of the Esthonian M.-Ordovician Oil-bearing Mineral "kukersite". University of Tartu. p. 25. ASIN:B0008AA1EM.
- Kogerman, P. N. (1925). "The present status of the oil-shale industry in Estonia" (PDF). Journal of the Institution of Petroleum Technologists. 11 (50). London: Institute of Petroleum: 16. ISSN 0368-2722.
- Kogerman, Paul N. (1927). The Oil-shale Industry of Estonia. Estonian ministry of trade and industry. p. 40. ASIN:B00087688I.
- Kogerman, Paul N.; Kranig, J. (1927). Physical Constants of Some Alkyl Carbonates. p. 11.
- Kogerman, Paul N. (1927). The Chemical Nature of Estonian Oil-shale: The Origin of Oil-shales. Mattiesen. p. 17.
- Kogerman, Paul N.; Kõll, A. (1930). Physical Properties of Estonian Shale Oils. Oil shale research laboratory of the University of Tartu. p. 19.
- Kogerman, Paul N. (1931). On the Chemistry of the Estonian Oil Shale Kukersite. Oil shale research laboratory of the University of Tartu. p. 85.
- Kogerman, Paul N.; Kopvillem, J. (1932). Hydrogenation of Estonian Oil Shale and Shale Oil. Oil shale research laboratory of the University of Tartu. p. 13.
- Kogerman, Paul N. (1932). Desulphurisation of Estonian Shale Oil. Oil shale research laboratory of the University of Tartu. p. 14.
- Kogerman, Paul N. (1933). The Occurrence, Nature and Origin of Asphaltites in Limestone and Oil Shale Deposits in Estonia. Oil shale research laboratory of the University of Tartu. p. 8.
- Kogerman, Paul N. (1937). Report on the Distillation of Estonian Oil-shales in the Pilot Plant of the K.T.O Patents Ltd. at Vanamõisa, Estonia. ASIN:B00089SQZY.
- Kogerman, Paul N. (1957). Shale Kerogen as a High-molecular-weight Substance and the Origin of Shales. Associated Technical Services.

== Biography ==
- Martinson, Helle; Martinson, Karl (1981). Akadeemik Paul Kogerman. Põlevkivikeemia rajaja Eestis. Tallinn.
- Kogerman, Aili (2004). Paul Kogerman ja tema aeg. Tallinn. ISBN 9985-50-366-X.

Political offices
Preceded by Aleksander Jaakson	Estonian Minister of Education; 1939–1940	Succeeded by Arnold Susi
