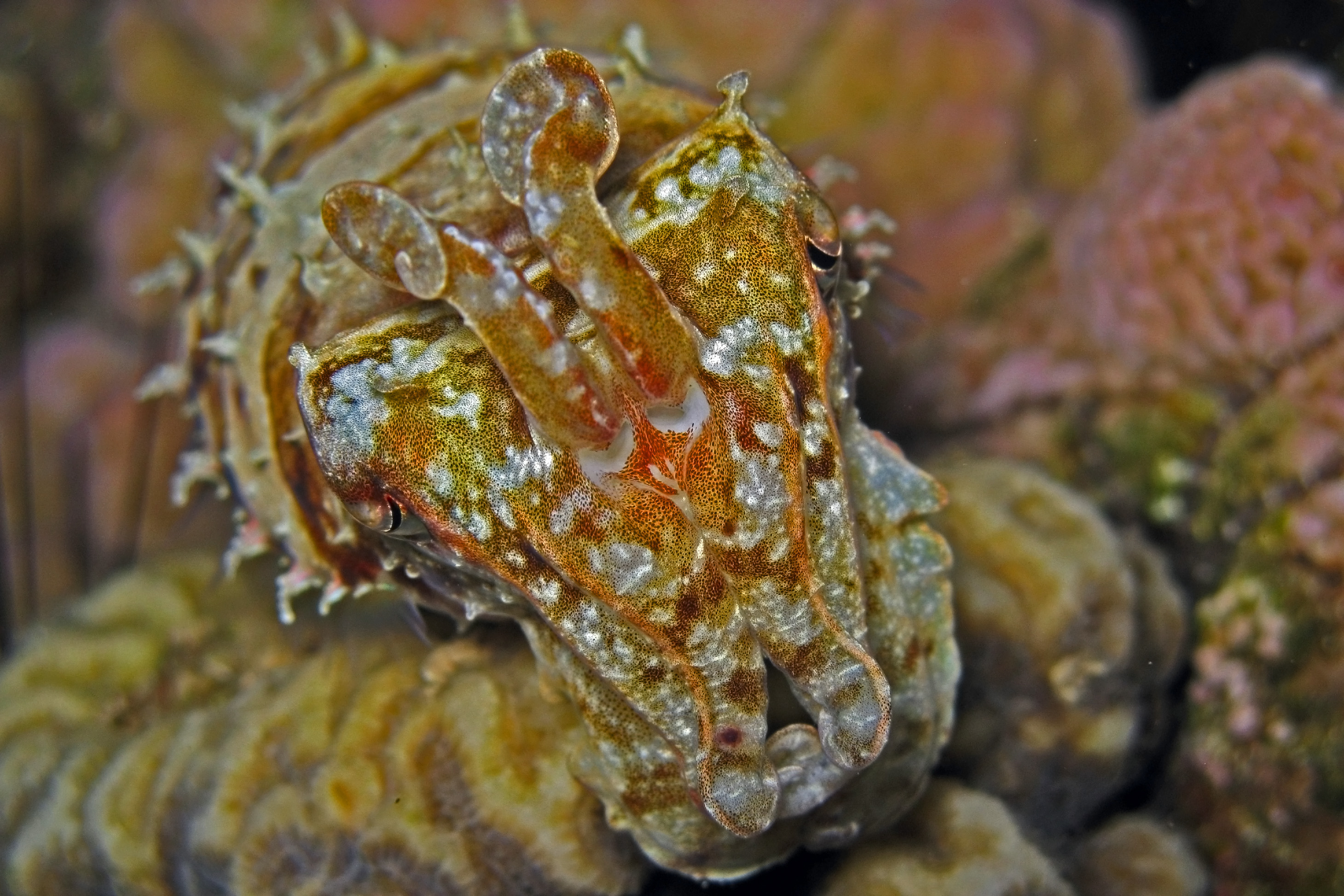

Conservation status
- Least Concern (IUCN 3.1)

Scientific classification
- Kingdom: Animalia
- Phylum: Mollusca
- Class: Cephalopoda
- Order: Sepiida
- Family: Sepiidae
- Genus: Rhombosepion
- Species: R. prashadi

Binomial name
- Rhombosepion prashadi Winckworth, 1936

= Rhombosepion prashadi =

Species of cuttlefish

Rhombosepion prashadi, common name hooded cuttlefish, is a widely distributed species of cuttlefish. It has a thin, oval body and grows from 5 to 11 cm. The tips of the tentacles have a distinct club shape. S. prashadi is a migratory, demersal cuttlefish living in shallow waters at depths of approximately 40 to 50 metres. It is found in many locations including the east coast of Africa, around India, in the Red Sea, and Persian Gulf.

== Description ==
The species was first reported in 1936 by Ronald Winckworth.

The common mantle of this species grows from 5 to 11 cm. It has an elongate, thin, oval body. It has tapering, subequal arms, and fins of medium width. At the end of the tentacles are broad, short, club shapes. There is a series of suckers on these clubs that are organized into eight oblique transverse rows. These suckers are of different sizes with three being enlarged on the third series. The dorsal surface of the cuttle bone is pink, making it highly distinct. Off Mumbai, India, the dorsal mantle lengths measured from 55 to 95 mm.

== Distribution ==
Rhombosepion prashadi is very widely distributed, chiefly in the Indian Ocean. It is found all along the east coast of Africa, around Madagascar, the waters of India, the Bay of Bengal, in the Red Sea, Persian Gulf, Gulf of Oman, and in the Andaman Sea. It is native to almost two dozen countries. (Note: "Bahrain; Comoros; Djibouti; Egypt (Egypt (African part), Sinai); Eritrea; India (Dadra-Nagar-Haveli, Daman, Goa, Gujarat, Karnataka, Kerala, Maharashtra, Orissa, Tamil Nadu); Iran; Iraq; Kenya; Kuwait; Madagascar; Mauritius; Mozambique; Oman; Pakistan; Qatar; Saudi Arabia; Somalia; Sri Lanka; Sudan; Tanzania; United Arab Emirates; Yemen (North Yemen, Socotra, South Yemen.")

== Habitat ==
This is a demersal species that lives in shallow waters at depths of roughly 40 meters to 50 meters. It is migratory as evidenced by a very notable seasonal occurrence pattern. In the waters of northeastern India the greatest numbers are seen between January and June. However, during some years it is most abundant between October and December. In more southern Indian waters such as those of Chennai, it occurs in greater numbers between January and April. It becomes abundant during times when there is an upwelling of deep water.

== Behaviour ==
Males exhibit various displays to attract females for coitus. While copulating, female is held by male, which puts his hectocotylus in the female's mantle cavity. Fertilization is the common outcome. Males die shortly after spawning. Females die after brooding. Hooded cuttlefish may act more curious and confident around divers compared to the behavior of squid or octopus. (Note: Hooded cuttlefish, Sepia prashadi: "This cuttlefish grows to about 1 5cm and is found over seagrass beds, where it preys on small fish. It's easy to tell cuttlefish apart from octopus or squid: they are much more confident and curious with divers.")

== Diet ==
Analysis of specimens off the coast of Mumbai showed that they were feeding mainly on prawns.

== Human uses ==
This species is caught in the Red Sea and also in India off the northeast coast by trawlers. It is also caught unintentionally as bycatch in comparatively small amounts off the northeast coast of India, which is not reflected independently in catch statistics. In 2005 in the Gulf of Suez, stock assessment studies identified Rhombosepion prashadi as an "under-exploited resource". Population and density are unknown as there have been no studies, and catch statistics are merely anecdotal and under reported. Ideally, in some habitats fishing needs to be curtailed.

== Threats ==
Increased carbon dioxide concentration in the atmosphere causes ocean acidification. This "is potentially a threat to all cuttlefish", which respond by having a "denser cuttlebone" likely to negatively affect buoyancy regulation.
