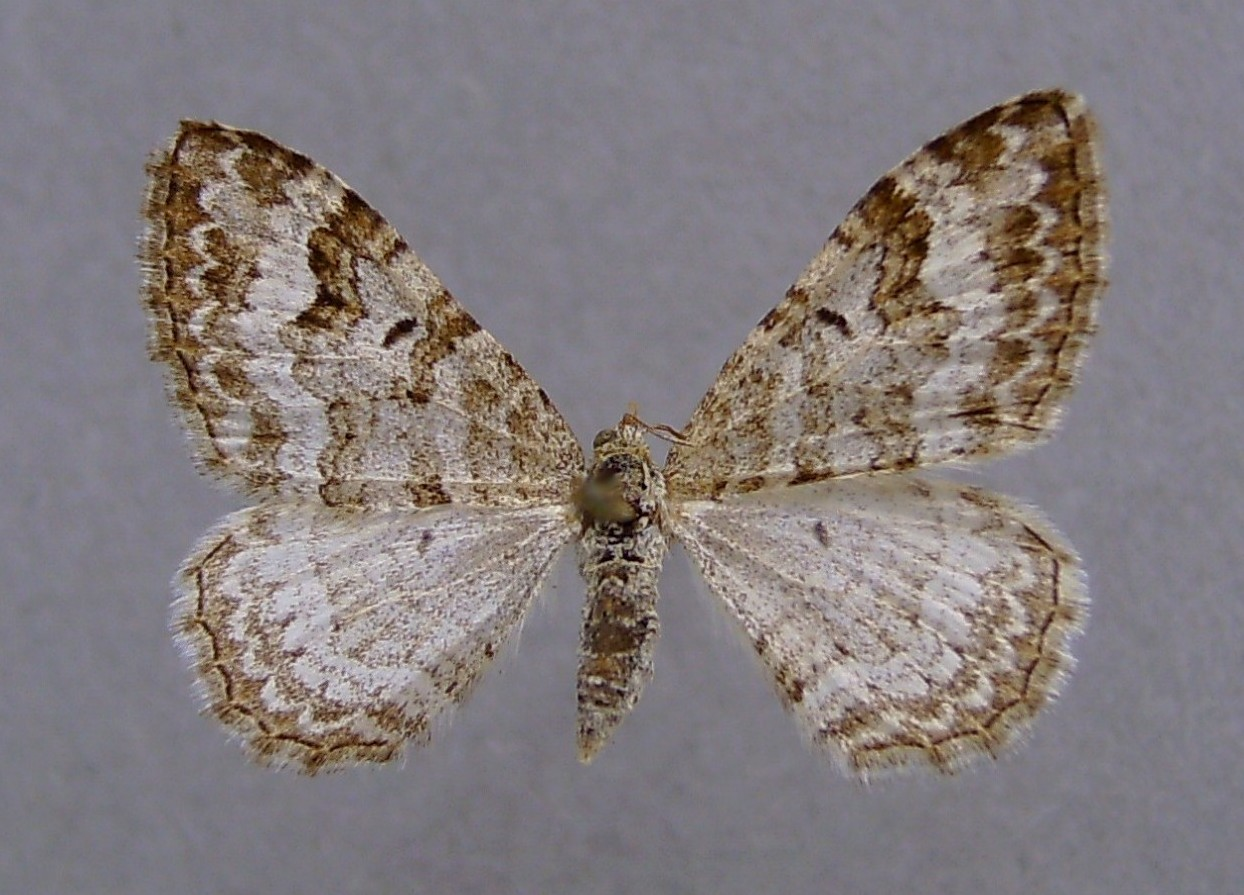

Scientific classification
- Domain: Eukaryota
- Kingdom: Animalia
- Phylum: Arthropoda
- Class: Insecta
- Order: Lepidoptera
- Family: Geometridae
- Genus: Epirrhoe
- Species: E. molluginata

Binomial name
- Epirrhoe molluginata (Hübner, 1813)

Synonyms
- Geometra molluginata Hubner, 1813; Euphyia molluginata; Cidaria poecilata Fuchs, 1901; Melanippe inustitata Guenee, 1858

= Epirrhoe molluginata =

Species of moth

Epirrhoe molluginata is a moth of the family Geometridae. It is found from the southern part of central Europe to the Caucasus.

The wingspan is about 23–27 mm. Adults are on wing from May to July.

The larvae feed on Galium species, including Galium mollugo and Galium sylvaticum. The species overwinters as a pupa.
