= Winkworth =

Winkworth may refer to:

== Places ==
- Boxhill (Louisville), also known as "Winkworth", a Georgian Revival house in Glenview, Kentucky
- Winkworth Arboretum, a National Trust-owned arboretum in Surrey, England

== People ==
- Catherine Winkworth (1827–1878), an English translator
- Ronald Winkworth (1884–1950), a British natural historian
- Susanna Winkworth (1820–1884), an English translator and philanthropist

== Fictional characters ==
- Dame Daphne Winkworth, a recurring character in the stories of English comic writer P. G. Wodehouse

== Organizations ==
- Winkworth plc, an estate agents in London, England
