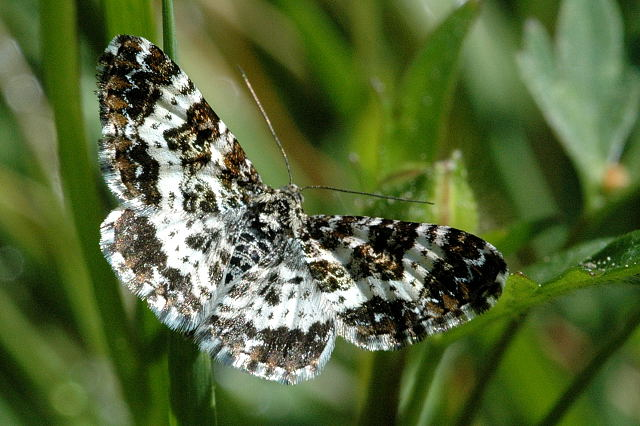

Scientific classification
- Kingdom: Animalia
- Phylum: Arthropoda
- Class: Insecta
- Order: Lepidoptera
- Family: Geometridae
- Genus: Epirrhoe
- Species: E. tristata

Binomial name
- Epirrhoe tristata (Linnaeus, 1758)

= Epirrhoe tristata =

Small argent and sable

Species of moth

Epirrhoe tristata, the small argent and sable, is a moth of the genus Epirrhoe in the family Geometridae. The species was first described by Carl Linnaeus in his 1758 10th edition of Systema Naturae.

== Distribution ==
The species can be found in the Palearctic realm, in western Europe from Scandinavia in the north to just south of the Alps, then east to the Caucasus, Russia, Russian Far East, and Siberia.

== Description ==
The wingspan is 24–26 mm. The forewing ground colour is white. There is a light brown central band with white edge lines. The outer margins of all wings are black with a small faint line.

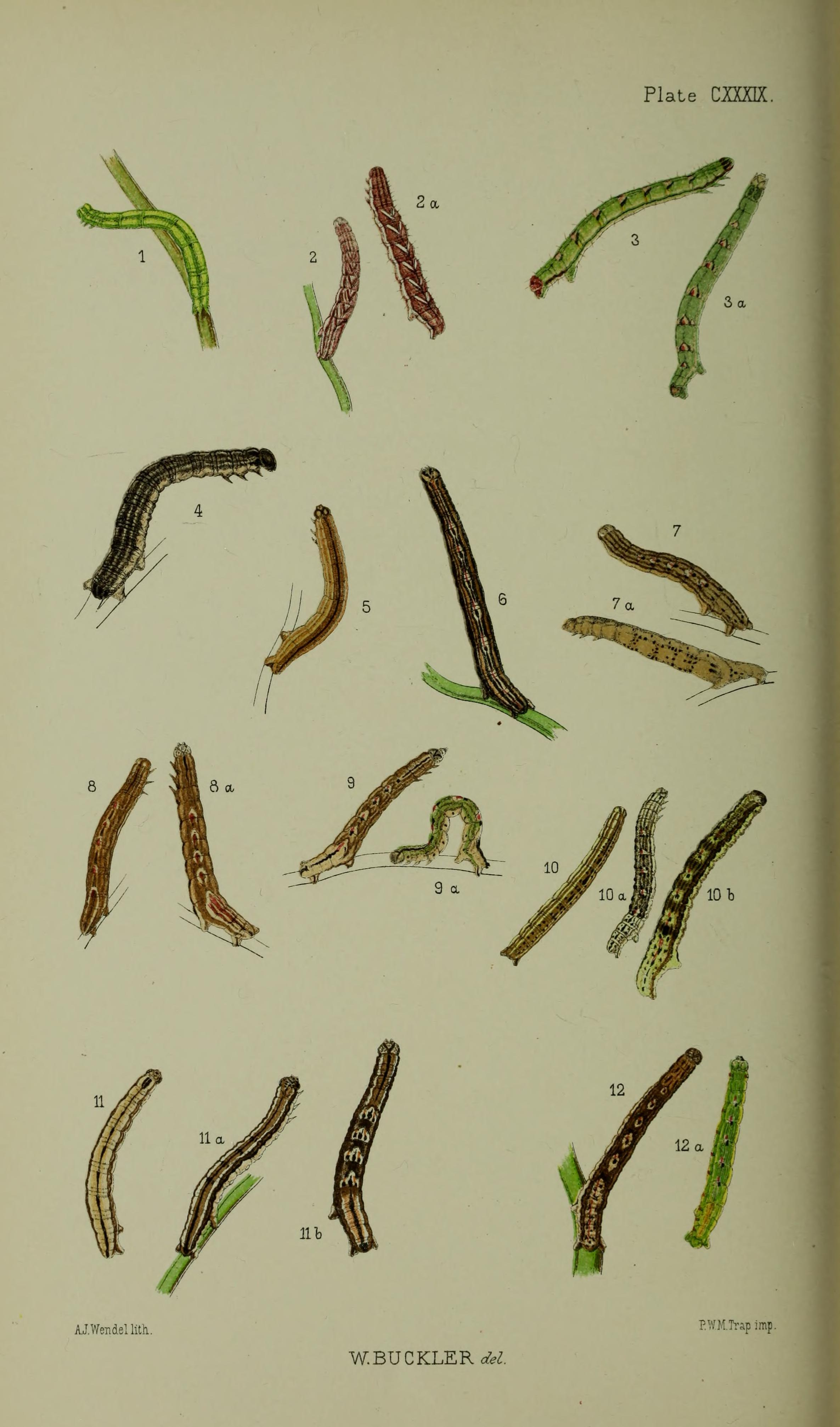
Fig.5 larvae after final moult

== Biology ==
The moth flies from May to July. The larva feeds on Galium species. It hibernates as pupa in a cocoon on the ground.

Upland habitats include moorland, limestone grassland, woodland and hedgerows. Lowland habitats include steppe, heaths and mosses.
