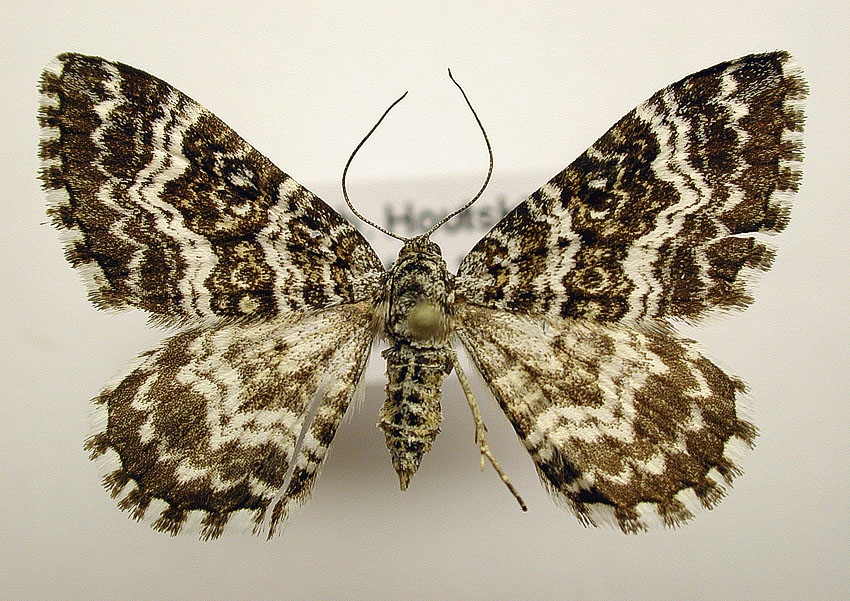

Scientific classification
- Kingdom: Animalia
- Phylum: Arthropoda
- Clade: Pancrustacea
- Class: Insecta
- Order: Lepidoptera
- Family: Geometridae
- Genus: Epirrhoe
- Species: E. pupillata

Binomial name
- Epirrhoe pupillata (Thunberg, 1788)

Synonyms
- Phalaena pupillata Thunberg, 1788; Geometra funerata Hubner, 1799

= Epirrhoe pupillata =

Species of moth

Epirrhoe pupillata is a moth of the family Geometridae. It is known from the mountains of Europe (from central Scandinavia to the Alps) to central Asia, Mongolia and Siberia.

The wingspan is 21–24 mm. There are two generations per year with adults on wing from June to August.

The larvae feed on Galium verum. Larvae can be found in June/July and from August to October. It overwinters as a pupa.

== Subspecies ==
- Epirrhoe pupillata pupillata
- Epirrhoe pupillata orientalis (Osthelder, 1909)
