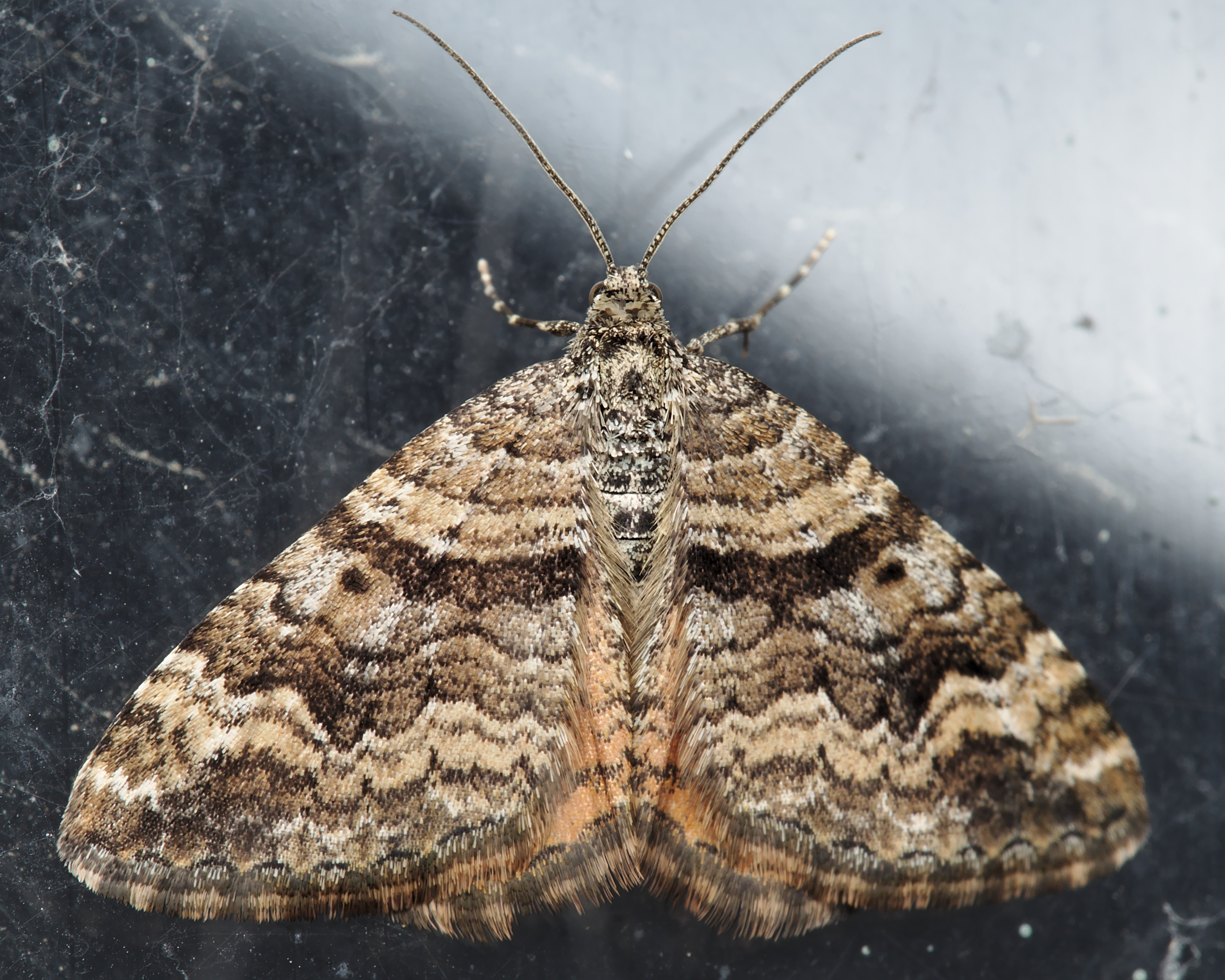

Scientific classification
- Kingdom: Animalia
- Phylum: Arthropoda
- Class: Insecta
- Order: Lepidoptera
- Family: Geometridae
- Tribe: Xanthorhoini
- Genus: Epirrhoe
- Species: E. plebeculata

Binomial name
- Epirrhoe plebeculata (Guenée in Boisduval & Guenée, 1858)

= Epirrhoe plebeculata =

Species of moth

Epirrhoe plebeculata is a species of geometrid moth in the family Geometridae. It is found in North America.

The MONA or Hodges number for Epirrhoe plebeculata is 7395.

== Subspecies ==
These two subspecies belong to the species Epirrhoe plebeculata:

- Epirrhoe plebeculata plebeculata
- Epirrhoe plebeculata vivida Barnes & McDunnough
