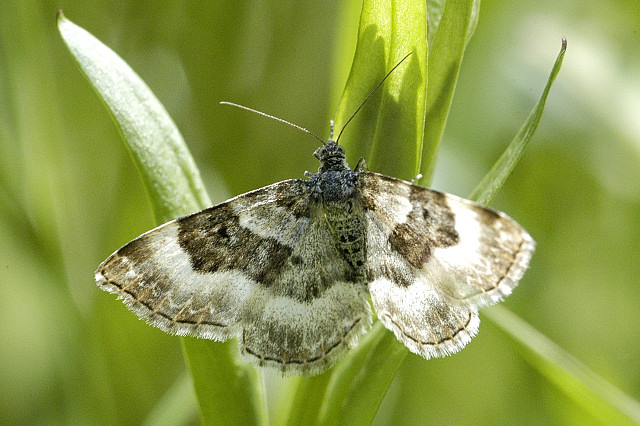

Scientific classification
- Domain: Eukaryota
- Kingdom: Animalia
- Phylum: Arthropoda
- Class: Insecta
- Order: Lepidoptera
- Family: Geometridae
- Genus: Epirrhoe
- Species: E. rivata

Binomial name
- Epirrhoe rivata (Hübner, 1813)

= Epirrhoe rivata =

Wood carpet

Species of moth

Epirrhoe rivata, the wood carpet, is a moth of the genus Epirrhoe in the family Geometridae. It is widespread in Europe, ranging to Armenia in the south.

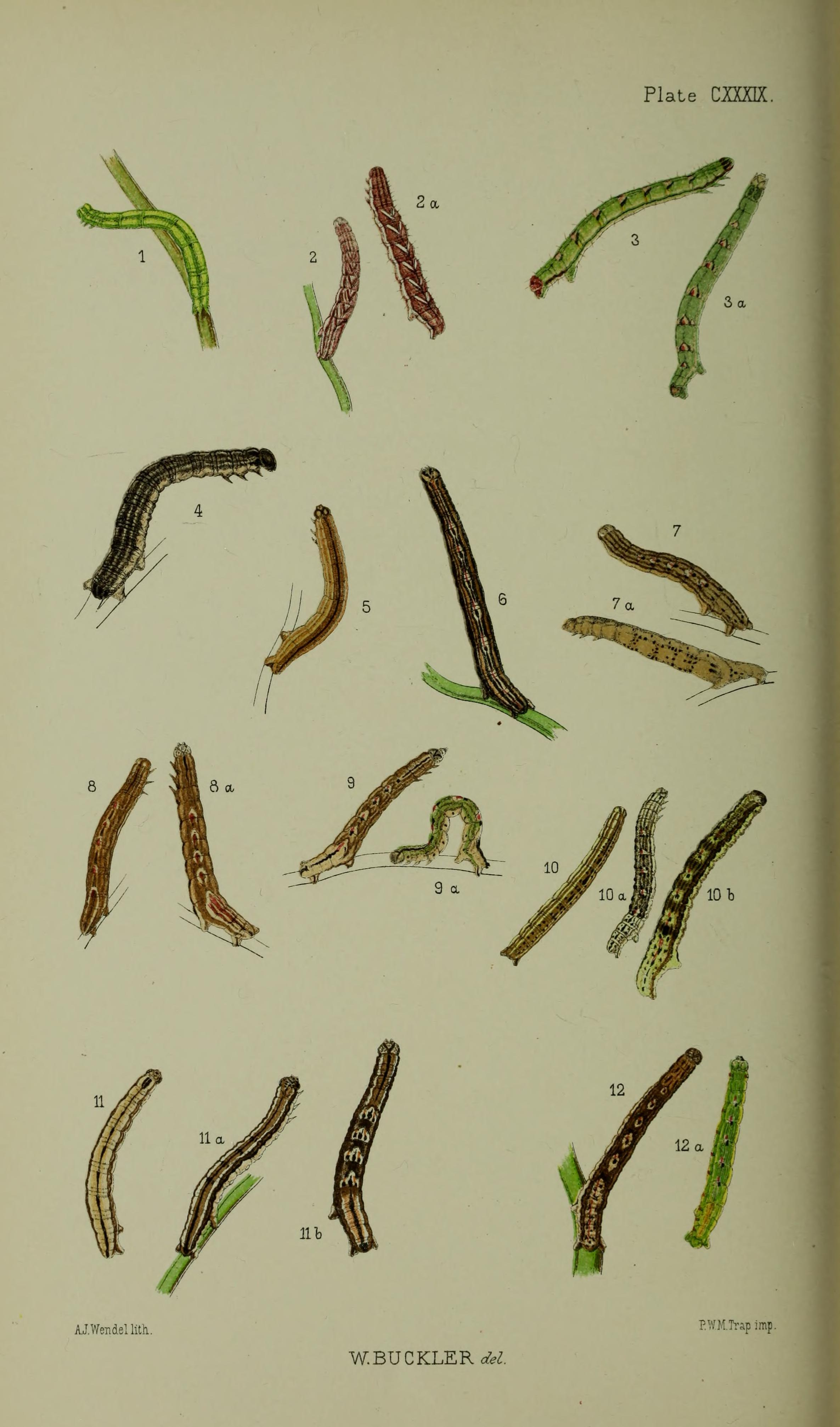
Fig.8, 8a larvae after final moult
