= Johannes Piiper =

Estonian zoologist and nature writer

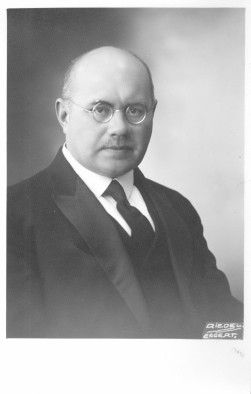
Johannes Piiper

Johannes Piiper (22 April 1882 in Tallinn – 5 October 1973 in Tartu) was an Estonian zoologist and nature writer.

In 1913 he graduated from St. Petersburg University. From 1919 to 1959 he taught at Tartu State University. From 1922 to 1940 he was the head of Kuusnõmme Biological Station. From 1922 to 1930 and 1932 to 1935 he was the head of Tartu University Zoological Museum.

From 1922 to 1924 he was the chief editor of the journal Loodus.

He was a founding member of the Estonian ornithological school Estonian: Eesti ornitoloogiakoolkond along with Mihkel Härms.

Awards:

- 1957: Estonian SSR merited scientist

== Works ==
- Üldise zooloogia põhijooned (1920)
- Loomageograafia (1926)
- Pilte ja hääli kodumaa loodusest (1935)
- Pilte ja hääli Eesti loodusest (1948, 1975)
- Rännakud Eesti radadel (1968)
