= Malacological Society of London =

Society for the study of molluscs

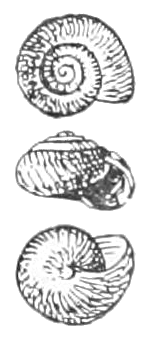
Ovachlamys fulgens, from Proceedings of the Malacological Society of London

The Malacological Society of London is a British learned society and charitable organisation concerned with malacology, the study of molluscs, a large phylum of invertebrate animals divided into nine or ten taxonomic classes, of which two are extinct.

Founded in 1893, the society was one of the earliest such national bodies anywhere in the world concerned only with molluscs, although the Conchological Society of Great Britain and Ireland is older.

== History ==
The society was founded in 1893 "to advance education, research and learning for the public benefit in the study of Mollusca from both pure and applied aspects". The society's first president was Henry Woodward.

On 15 September 1901 the society lost its secretary, Martin Fountain Woodward, who was drowned when a boat he was travelling in capsized off the coast of County Galway while he was in temporary charge of the marine biological laboratory of the Fisheries Board for Ireland at Innisbofin.

Founding members included the zoologist and malacologist E. A. Smith, president of the society from 1901 to 1903, and J. R. le B. Tomlin, who named more than a hundred taxa of gastropod molluscs and architect Henry William Burrows. Another notable early member was the geologist Caroline Birley, who joined the society in 1894. Henry Haversham Godwin-Austen (1834–1923), author of The Land and Freshwater Mollusca of India (1882–1887) and George Bond Howes (1853–1905) were early presidents of the society, and M. W. K. Connolly, who published some fifty papers on molluscs, was a member of the society from 1908 to 1938 and was president of the Conchological Society in 1930. The Australian naturalist Charles Hedley was a vice-president of the society from 1923 until his death in 1926. Ronald Winckworth, a member since 1919, served as the society's editor and went on to be its president from 1939 to 1942.

== Work ==
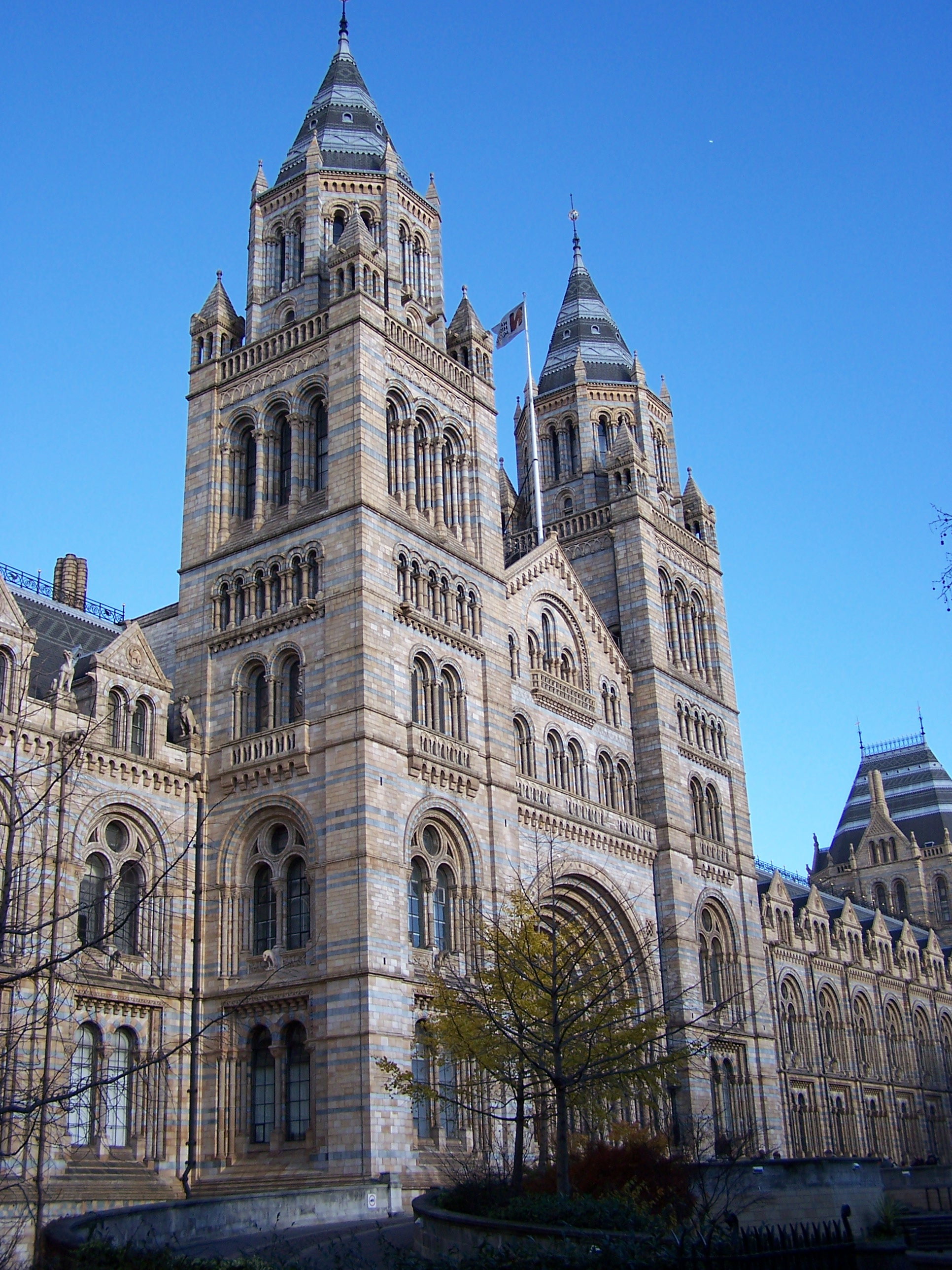
The Natural History Museum, venue for the Society's annual "Molluscan Forum"

Molluscs range in size from cephalopods such as the octopus and giant squid to microscopic gastropod snails, and the society is concerned with some 85,000 recognised extant species, which include 23 per cent of all named marine organisms as well as molluscs living in freshwater and terrestrial habitats. It is also interested in the species (including those of the two extinct classes of molluscs) preserved as fossils, which creates a relationship with the study of geology.

In association with the Oxford University Press, the society publishes the Journal of Molluscan Studies, previously called Proceedings of the Malacological Society, and Proceedings of the Malacological Society of London, an international journal to disseminate new research work on molluscs, and also a bulletin, The Malacologist, for its own members, to which there is free access on the society's web site.

The society organises meetings and symposia and seeks to advance education about and awareness of molluscs. It gives prizes for contributions in its field and makes awards to students (and also to others who are not employed) to enable them to travel and research malacological subjects.

An annual Malacological Society "Molluscan Forum" takes place at the Natural History Museum, London, with the 14th held in November 2011. An informal event, this is intended to bring together people beginning mollusc research, whether palaeontological, physiological, ecological, morphological, systematic, or molecular, with time for presentations and discussions. Attendance is open to all, at no charge, but those wishing to give presentations should be students engaged on molluscan projects or amateurs with substantial unpublished work.

The society has been registered with the Charity Commission for England and Wales since 1978, with the registration number 275980.

== Structure ==
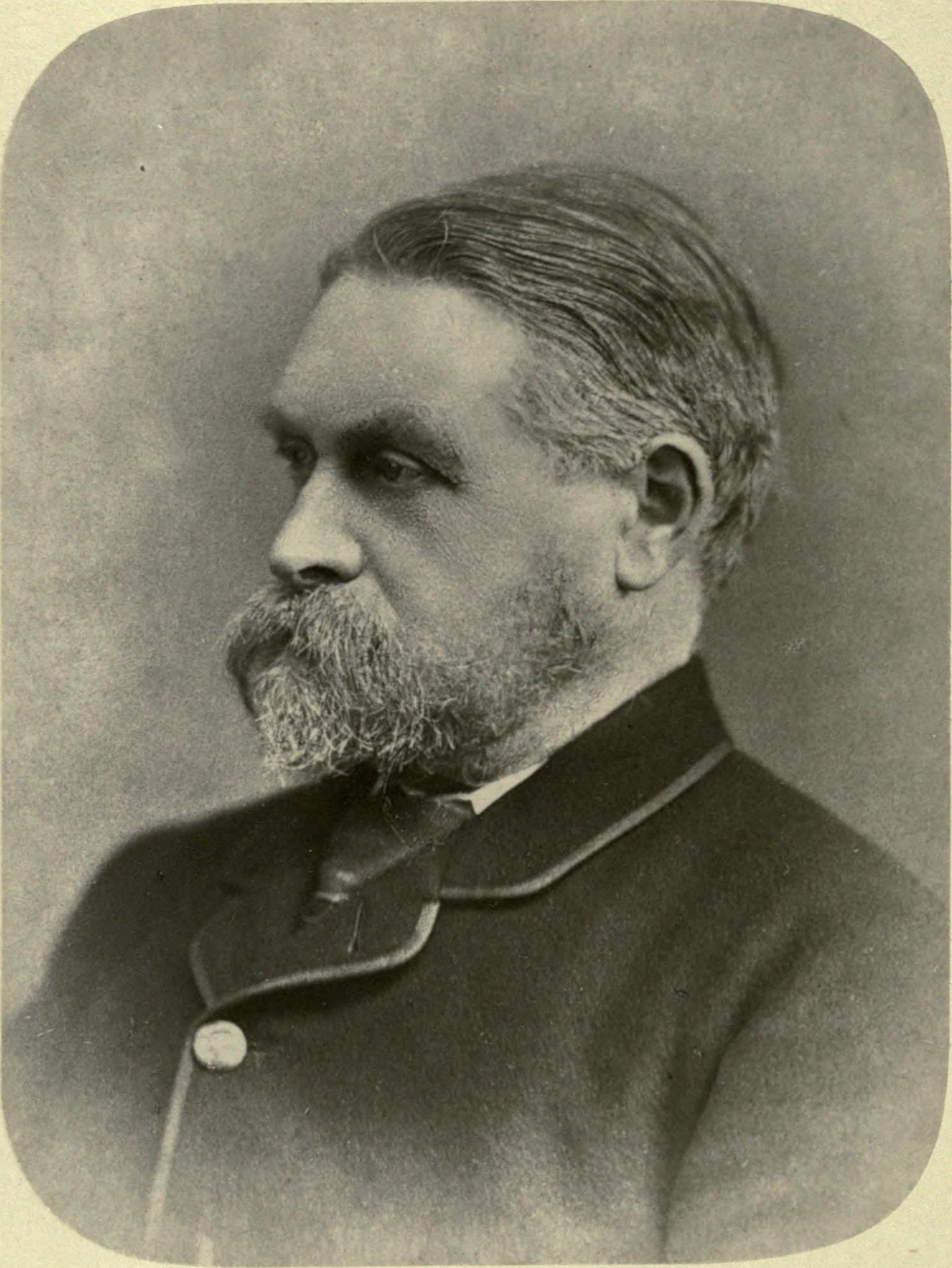
Henry Godwin-Austen, an early President

Membership of the society is open to all by subscription, with three classes of members, student members, ordinary members and honorary members, of whom there can be no more than five at any one time.

The society's affairs are managed by a council consisting of officers and members elected at annual general meetings. Six elected members of the council, who are called councillors, serve for three years each, with two vacancies arising every year. The officers are a president, two vice-presidents, an honorary secretary and an honorary treasurer, a membership secretary, the editor of the journal and the editor of The Malacologist, an awards officer, and a web manager. Up to four additional members of the council can be co-opted.

== Collections ==
The library of the Society was deposited in University College London in 1930. The library comprises circa. 500 volumes from the 16th century onwards. It includes a first edition of Georges Cuvier's work Anatomie des mollusques which contains Cuvier's own woodblock library stamp and inscription.

== Similar societies ==
In the UK:

- Conchological Society of Great Britain and Ireland

In other countries:

- American Malacological Society
- Malacological Society of Australasia
- Belgian Malacological Society
- Estonian Malacological Society
- German Malacological Society
- Hawaiian Malacological Society
- Israel Malacological Society
- Italian Malacological Society
- Malacological Society of Japan
- Netherlands Malacological Society
- Association of Polish Malacologists
- European Quaternary Malacologists
- Conchologists of America

== See also ==
- Linnean Society of London
- Geological Society of London
- Geologists' Association
- List of geoscience organisations
