= Lombi, Tartu County =

Village in Estonia

Lombi
- Village (küla)
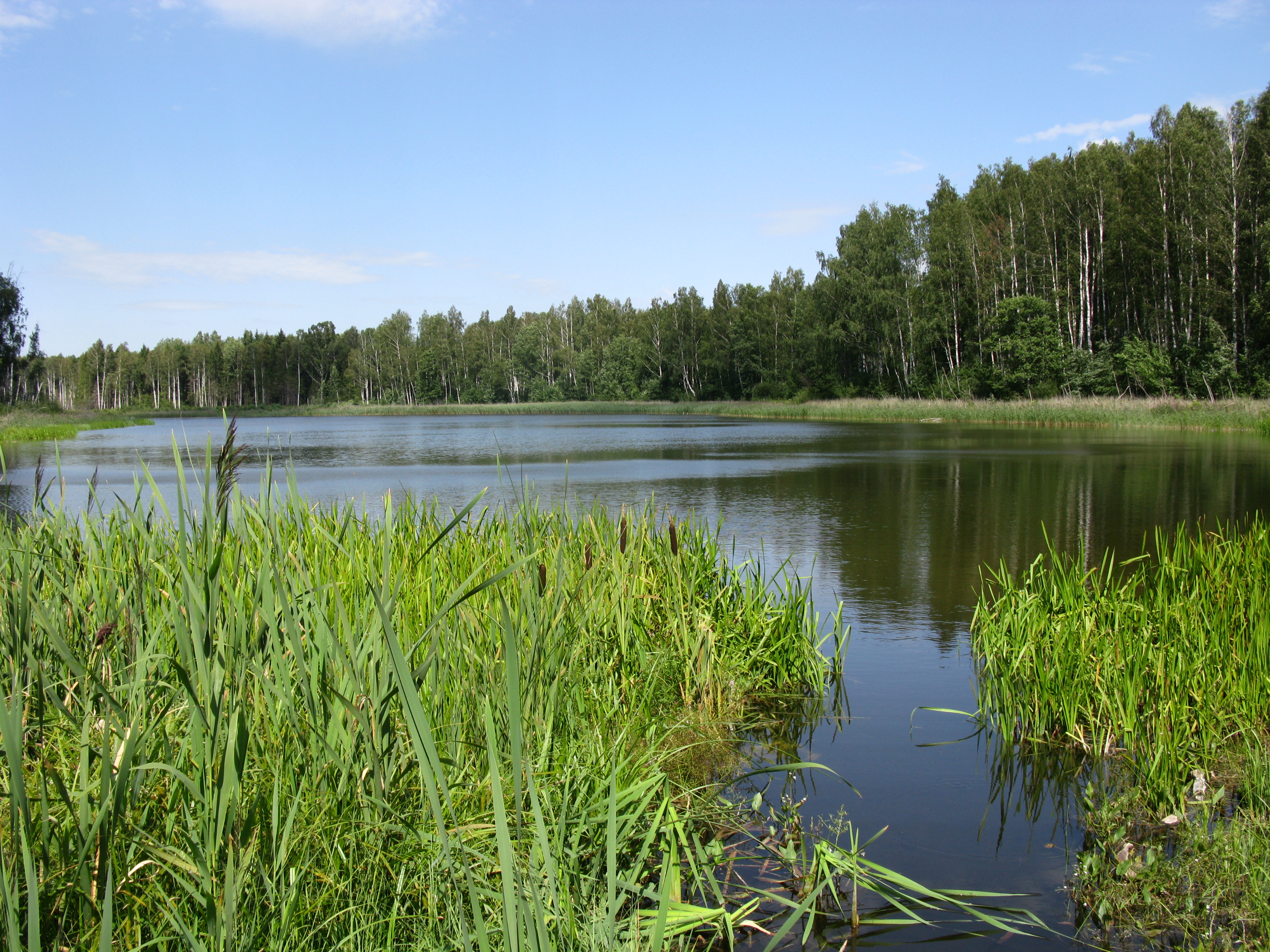
- Lake Vasula in Lombi

- Location within Estonia
- Coordinates: 58°26′43″N 26°45′33″E
- Country: Estonia
- County: Tartu
- Municipality: Tartu

Population (31 December 2011)
  - Total: 133
- 2011 Estonia Census
- Time zone: UTC+2
  - Summer (DST): UTC+3
- Post code: 60516
- EHAK: 4487

Lombi is a village in the municipality of Tartu, Tartu County, Estonia.

Despite its name, Vasula Lake lies within the boundaries of Lombi, not within those of the neighbouring village Vasula.

== Demographics ==
The population recorded in censuses has been:

Census date	Population
2000-03-31	91
2011-12-31	133
