= Toomas Trapido =

Estonian politician

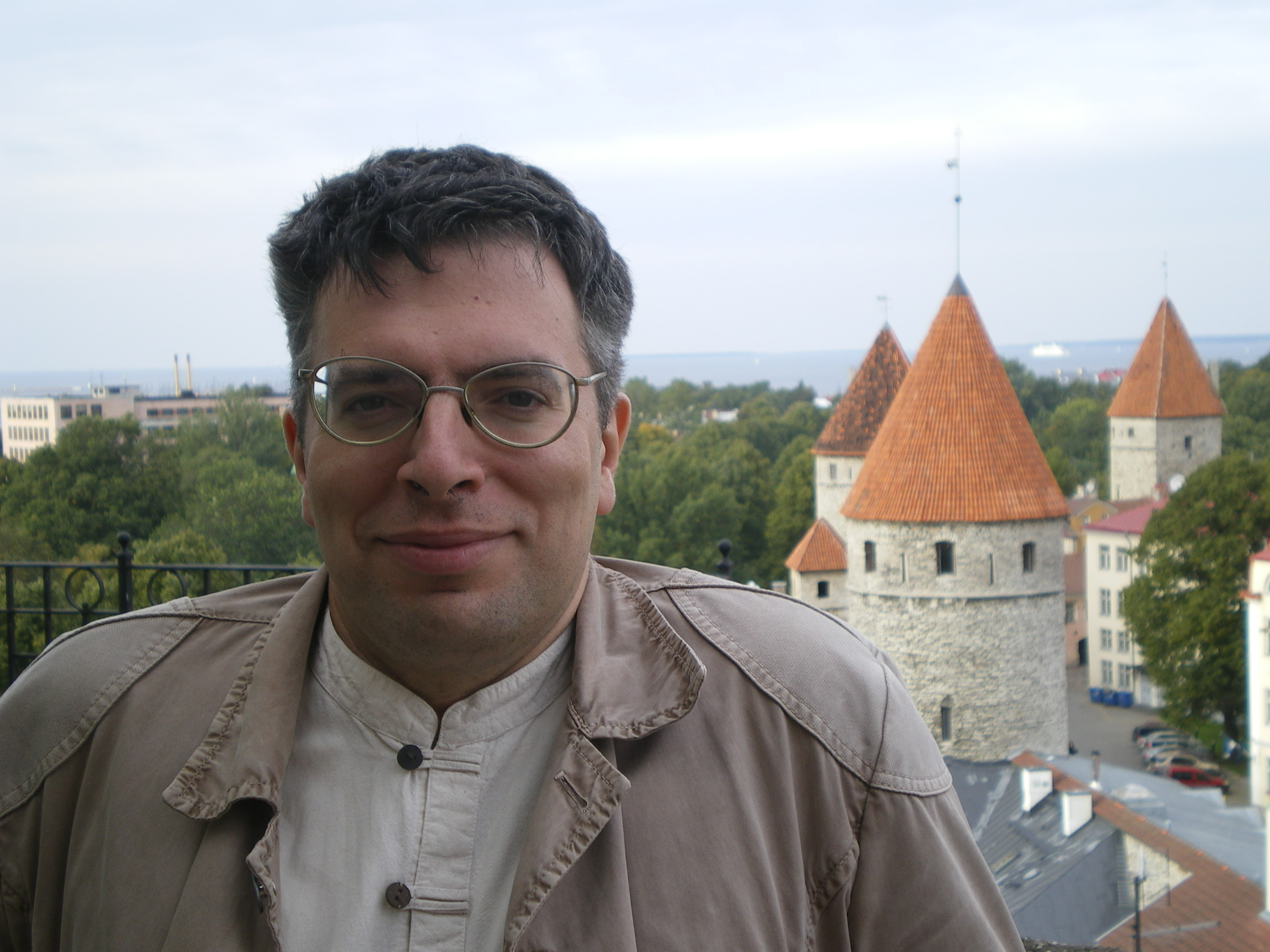
Toomas Trapido

Toomas Trapido (born 15 April 1972) is an Estonian biologist, researcher, educator, and politician. He was a member of the XI Riigikogu.

Trapido was born in Tallinn. He is a member of the Estonian Greens party.
