= Vasula =

Village in Tartu County, Estonia

- Small borough
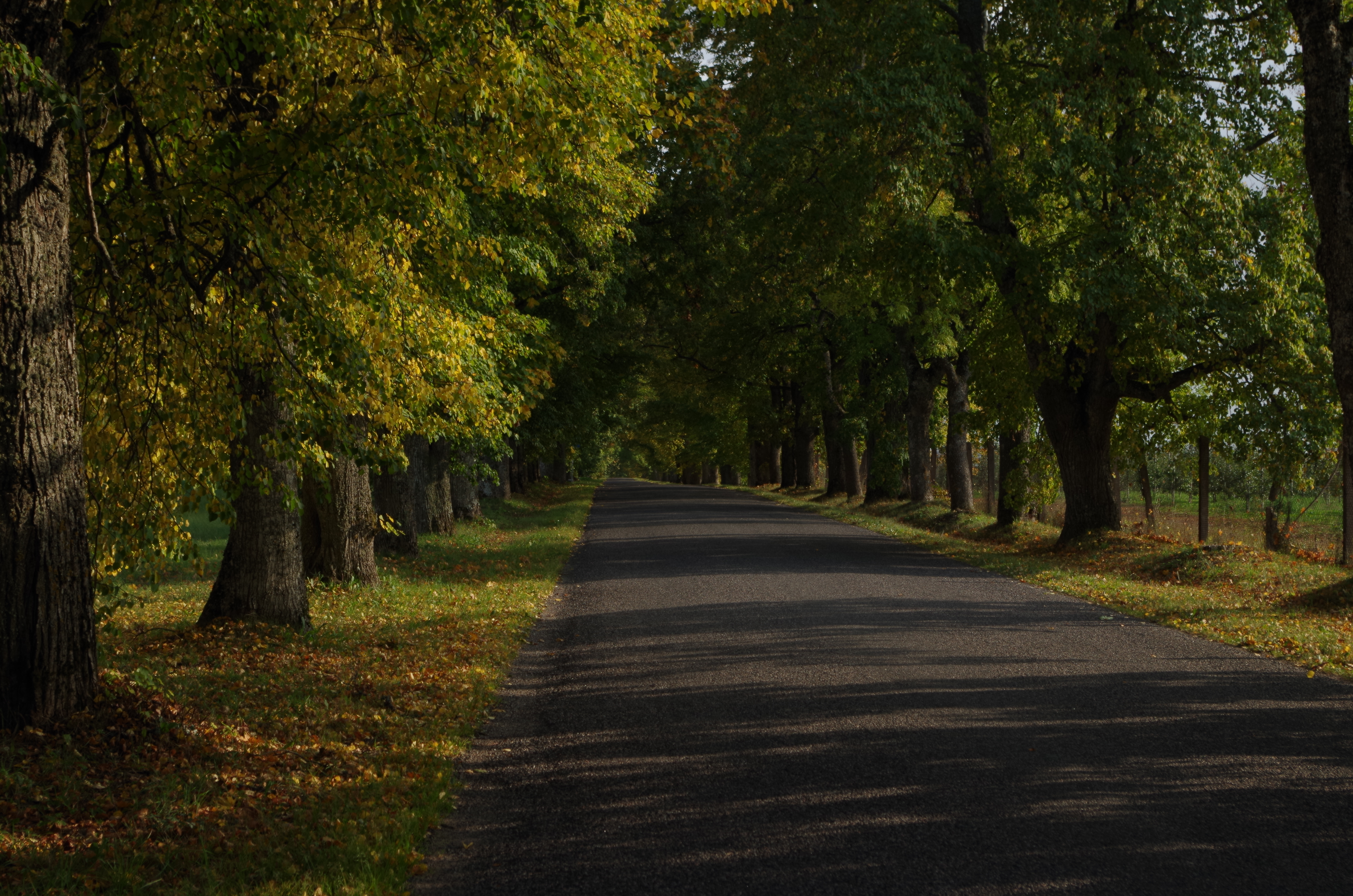
- Linden alley on the road entering to Vasula.

- Location in Estonia
- Coordinates: 58°28′13″N 26°44′30″E
- Country: Estonia
- County: Tartu County
- Municipality: Tartu Parish
- First mentioned: 1220

Population (2011 Census)
  - Total: 273

Vasula is a small borough (Estonian: alevik) in Tartu Parish, Tartu County, in southern Estonia. It is about 10 km (6 mi) north of the centre of Tartu, the second largest city in Estonia. Vasula is situated on the left bank of the Amme river. As of the 2011 census, the population of Vasula was 273.

Vasula was first mentioned, as Wasala, in 1220 in the Livonian Chronicle of Henry.

Vasula gained its small borough status in 2013; before that it was a village.

Since 1997, a rock music festival Amme Rock has been held annually in Vasula.

There is a lake called Vasula Lake in the neighbouring village of Lombi, just south of Vasula.

== Vasula Manor ==
Vasula Manor was first mentioned in 1446 as Wazel. In 1636, the manor was obtained by Swedish philosopher, poet and scientist Georg Stiernhielm (1598–1672). It remained in the possession of the Stiernhielm family for 170 years. In the 18th century the manor was owned by the Russian noble House of Sheremetev for a number of years.
