= Henry Burrows (cricketer) =

Henry Burrows (born 1771 and christened 25 September 1771 at Monken Hadley, Hertfordshire; died 11 May 1829 at Westminster) was an English amateur cricketer.

== Career ==
Burrows was mainly associated with Middlesex, and he made three known appearances in important matches from 1801 to 1815.
