= Kuulo Kalamees =

Estonian mycologist (1934–2026)

Kuulo Kalamees (15 April 1934 – 6 August 2026) was an Estonian mycologist.

From 1959, he taught at the University of Tartu and the Estonian University of Life Sciences; since 1997 Emeritus Professor.

Kalamees described several genera, e.g. Tricholomella.

Kalamees died on 6 August 2026, at the age of 92.
