= Henry William Burrows =

English palaeontologist

- Born: 1858
- Died: 1939 (aged 80–81)
- Occupations: Architect, Amateur Palaeontologist
- Known for: Founder of the Malacological Society of London, Contributions to Tertiary fossils
- Awards: Honorary Member of the Malacological Society of London (1932)

Henry William Burrows (1858–1939) was an English architect and amateur palaeontologist, who 'devoted his leisure to Tertiary fossils'. Burrows was elected a Fellow of the Geological Society in 1900. He was one of the founders of the Malacological Society of London in 1893, and was elected an honorary member in 1932.

== Selected works ==
- With George Frederick Harris The Eocene and Oligocene beds of the Paris basin. London :University college, E. Stanford,1891.pdf
- Burrows, H. W. & Holland, R. 1897. The foraminifera of the Thanet Beds of Pegwell Bay. Proceedings of the Geologists' Association, 15, 19–52.
