= Ronald Winckworth =

British teacher, librarian, editor and malacologist (1884–1950)

Ronald Winckworth (1884 – 6 September 1950) was a British natural historian who became president or vice-president of three learned societies in the field, and who wrote on the topic of British and Indian mollusca.

== Life ==
Winckworth was born in Brighton in 1884 and attended Epsom College. He then taught in Weymouth (1902), Eastbourne (1903–1905) and at St. Bees School (1905–1906) before winning an open exhibition to Jesus College, Oxford. He then taught at Radley College and Wellington College (1911) and Brighton Technical School (1912–1914). He served in the Royal Navy Volunteer Reserve during the First World War, reaching the rank of paymaster lieutenant, before working at the Marine Biological Laboratory in Plymouth. After teaching navigation at Pangbourne Nautical College, he worked for the Royal Society on publications, later becoming librarian, assistant secretary (1932–1937) and assistant editor (1937–1944). After retiring in 1944, he carried out occasional work as consultant editor.

He was a member of the Conchological Society of Great Britain and Ireland from 1913 onwards, serving as President (1930–1931). His paper on British marine mollusca, his presidential address, was the most cited of his many writings, which were mainly on British and Indian mollusca. He became a member of the Malacological Society of London in 1919, later becoming its editor, and serving as President (1939–1942). He was a member of the Linnean Society from 1935 onwards, serving on the council from 1943 and as Vice President (1945–1947). He was also a Fellow of the Zoological Society and Royal Geographical Society. He died on 6 September 1950.

== See also ==
- Sepia prashadi
