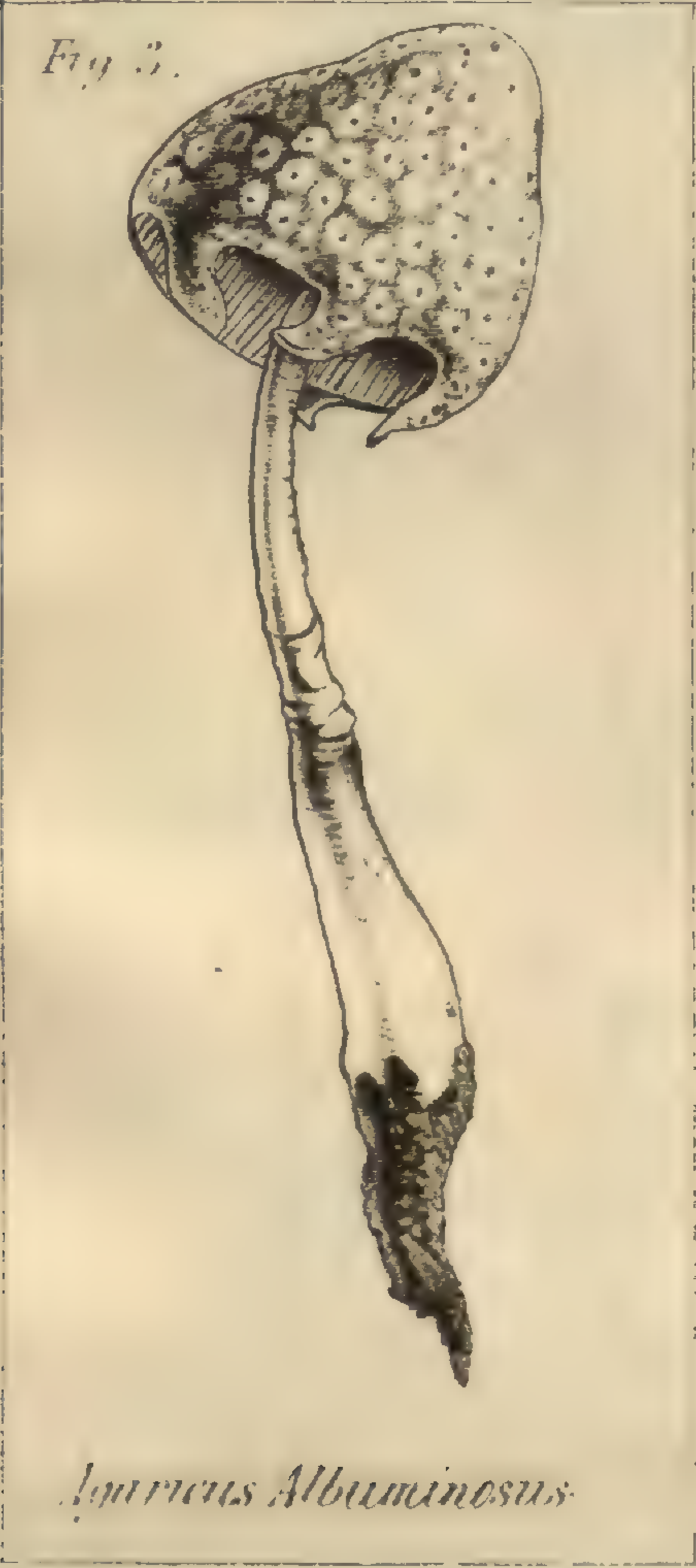
- The original illustration in The London Journal of Botany

Scientific classification
- Kingdom: Fungi
- Division: Basidiomycota
- Class: Agaricomycetes
- Subclass: Agaricomycetidae
- Order: Agaricales
- Family: Agaricaceae
- Genus: Macrolepiota
- Species: M. albuminosa

Binomial name
- Macrolepiota albuminosa (Berk.) Pegler (1972)

Synonyms
- Agaricus albuminosus Berk. (1847); Lepiota albuminosa (Berk.) Sacc. (1887); Collybia albuminosa (Berk.) Petch (1912); Gymnopus albuminosus (Berk.) Overeem (1927); Termitomyces albuminosus (Berk.) R.Heim (1941)

= Macrolepiota albuminosa =

Species of fungus

Macrolepiota albuminosa is a species of agaric fungus in the family Agaricaceae.

== Description ==
As described by Miles Joseph Berkeley (1847):

On the ground. Peradenia, Ceylon. June, 1844. Pileus campanulate obtuse 1½ inch broad, white, noduloso squamose clothed with a glutinous veil, portions of which remain attached to the margin, while others form transverse scales on the stem exactly as in Cortinaria collinita. Stem 3 inches high, 2 lines thick in the centre, attenuated upwards, almost bulbous below. Gills white.

== Taxonomical history ==
Date	Event
1847	This species was first described by Miles Joseph Berkeley using the specimen collection from Ceylon (now Sri Lanka). He named this species Agaricus albuminosus.
1887	Pier Andrea Saccardo renamed this species Lepiota albuminosa.
1891	Otto Kuntze renamed this species Mastocephalus albuminosus. Mastocephalus is a synonym of Leucocoprinus.
1912	Thomas Petch identified the original specimens as termite mushrooms, renamed this species Collybia albuminosa, and listed Collybia eurhiza (now Termitomyces eurrhizus) a synonym of this species.
1927	Casper van Overeem renamed this species Gymnopus albuminosus.
1941	Roger Heim renamed this species Termitomyces albuminosus.
1969	David Pegler and R. W. Rayner commented that the identification by Petch (1912) of the original specimens failed to address their microscopic morphology.
1972	Pegler renamed this species Macrolepiota albuminosa.
1977	Heim redescribed Termitomyces albuminosus using specimens from India.
1979	Krishnamoorthy Natarajan examined the 1977 specimen collection, and newly described a species Termitomyces heimii to accommodate these specimens.
1986	Pegler listed Macrolepiota albuminosa a synonym of Leucocoprinus cepistipes.
