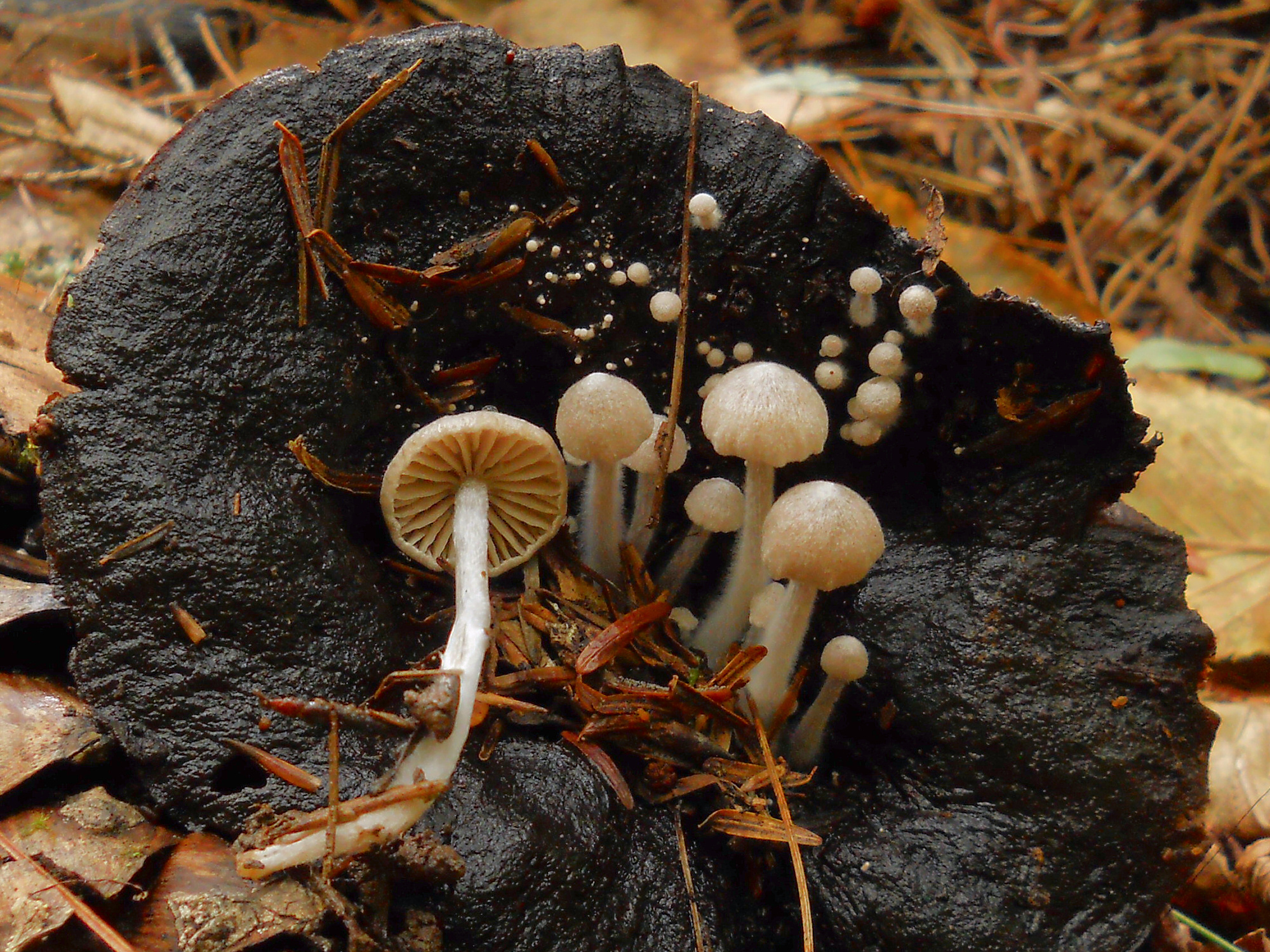

Scientific classification
- Kingdom: Fungi
- Division: Basidiomycota
- Class: Agaricomycetes
- Order: Agaricales
- Family: Lyophyllaceae
- Genus: Asterophora
- Species: A. parasitica

Binomial name
- Asterophora parasitica (Bull. ex Pers.) Singer (1951)

Synonyms
- Agaricus parasiticus Bull. ex Pers. (1801); Gymnopus parasiticus (Bull.) Gray (1821); Merulius parasiticus (Pers. ex Bull.) Purton (1821); Nyctalis parasitica (Bull.) Fr. (1838)

= Asterophora parasitica =

Species of fungus

Asterophora parasitica, commonly known as the parasitic Asterophora or the Russula parasite, is a species of fungus that grows as a parasite on other mushrooms. The fruit bodies are small, with silky fibers on the surface of grayish caps and thick, widely spaced gills. Mushrooms fruit in clusters on the decaying remains of Lactarius and Russula species, particularly those in the Russula nigricans group. Found primarily in temperate zones of Europe and North America, the fungus is widespread but not common.

== Taxonomy ==
Jean Baptiste Francois Pierre Bulliard first described the species as Agaricus parasiticus in 1791; it was sanctioned under that name by Elias Magnus Fries in his 1822 Systema Mycologicum. Rolf Singer transferred it to Asterophora in 1951. Synonyms include Gymnopus parasiticus, published by Samuel Frederick Gray in 1821, Merulius parasiticus by Thomas Purton in 1821, and Nyctalis parasitica by Elias Fries in 1838.

According to the nomenclatural database MycoBank, facultative synonyms (based on a different type) include the following: Agaricus umbratus described by William Withering in 1796; Agaricus pilipes described by Sowerby in 1803; and Agaricus microphyllus, described by August Carl Joseph Corda in 1840.

Asterophora parasitica is commonly known as the "parasitic asterophora" or the "Russula parasite".

== Description ==
The cap is initially round to convex before flattening, reaching a diameter of 8–20 mm (0.3–0.8 in). The caps of young fruit bodies have a smooth surface that is covered with smooth fibrils. The cap color is white to pale grey, changing to grayish brown in maturity. The cap margin is initially rolled inward. The flesh is thin, with a whitish to brownish color; it has an unpleasant odor and a farinaceous (mealy) taste. The thick, widely spaced gills have an attached to somewhat decurrent attachment to the stem. They are whitish to grayish brown, often poorly developed, sometimes forked near the cap margin, and have edges covered with fine granules. The stipe measures 1–3 cm (0.4–1.2 in) long by 2–3 mm (0.08–0.12 in) thick. Its surface has fine white fibers on a grayish brown background. The base of the cap sometimes is finely velvety and white. Initially solid, the stipe becomes hollow in age. Asterophora parasitica produces a white spore print. The edibility of the mushrooms is unknown.

Spores are elliptical, smooth, hyaline (translucent), and measure 5–6 by 3–4 μm. Chlamydospores produced by the gills are spindle-shaped to oval, usually thick-walled, and measure 12–17 by 9–10 μm.

== Life cycle ==
Much of the life cycle of Asterophora parasitica was first elaborated in detail by German mycologist Julius Oscar Brefeld, who was able to germinate basidiospores and chlamydospores.

== Ecology and distribution ==
Fruit bodies grow in groups or clusters on the decomposing mushrooms of Lactarius and Russula species, particularly those in the Russula nigricans group. It has been reported from Europe and North America. Although not uncommon in southern and central Europe, it is rare in Scandinavia, where it does not grow outside the northern limit of Quercus (oak) species, suggesting that character of the soil in which the host mushrooms grow can affect the suitability as a substrate for A. parasitica. It takes about three weeks for A. parasitica to complete its development on an agaric.

The yeast Asterotremella albida has been isolated from the gill tissue of Asterophora parasitica. The yeast, which is also found on Asterophora lycoperdoides, is tremelloid, meaning it has cup-shaped parenthesomes.
