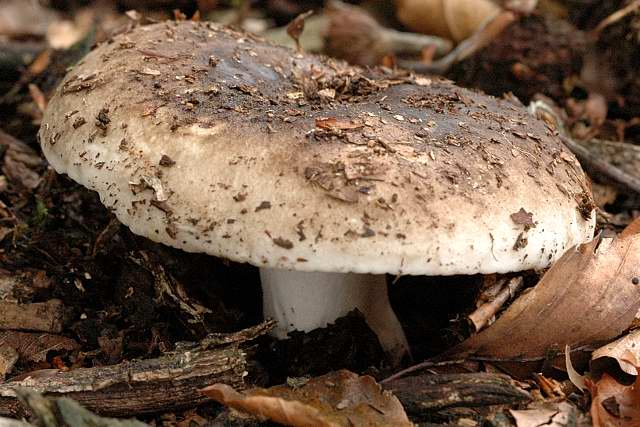

Scientific classification
- Kingdom: Fungi
- Division: Basidiomycota
- Class: Agaricomycetes
- Order: Russulales
- Family: Russulaceae
- Genus: Russula
- Species: R. adusta

Binomial name
- Russula adusta (Pers.) Fr. (1838)

Synonyms
- List: Agaricus nigricans Bull. (1785); Agaricus adustus Pers (1801); Agaricus elephantinus Bolton (1788); Agaricus nigrescens Bull. (1791); Agaricus elephantinus Sowerby (1796); Agaricus adustus var. elephantinus Pers. (1801); Omphalia adusta var. elephantinus (Pers.) Gray (1821); Omphalia adusta ß elephantinus (Bolton) Gray (1821); Agaricus adustus var. elephantinus (Bolton) Fr. (1821); Omphalia adusta (Pers.) Gray (1821); Russula nigricans (Bull.) Fr. (1838); Russula elephantina (Bolton) Fr. (1838); Russula nigricans var. adusta (Pers.) Barbier (1907); Lactarelis nigricans (Fr.) Earle (1909); Russula eccentrica Peck (1911); Russula subusta Burl. (1915); Russula nigricans subsp. eccentrica (Peck) Singer (1958); Russula nigricans var. eccentrica (Peck) Blanco-Dios (2021)

= Russula adusta =

Species of fungus

Russula adusta Mycological characteristics
- Gills on hymenium
- Cap is convex or depressed
- Hymenium is adnate
- Stipe is bare
- Spore print is white
- Edibility is poisonous

Russula adusta, commonly known as the blackening brittlegill or blackening russula, is a species of gilled mushroom. It is a member of the Russula subgenus Compactae. The cap is brown to gray and somewhat shiny, with a mild taste and, reportedly, an odor of empty wine barrels. It has a propensity to turn black from cutting or bruising and has white spores. Similar species include Russula albonigra and R. densifolia.

Russula adusta is found in woodlands of Europe and North America, growing under conifers.

== Taxonomy ==
Russula adusta was first described by the French mycologist Pierre Bulliard in 1785 as Agaricus nigricans, before gaining its current binomial name from the Swedish mycologist Elias Magnus Fries.

== Description ==
This is a large member of the genus Russula, and it has a cap that is dirty white when young, but swiftly turns brown, and then black on aging. It measures 5–20 cm (2–8 in) in diameter. There is usually a large depression in the centre of mature caps, which are three quarter peeling. The stem is white, firm, and straight, measuring 5–8 cm (2–3 in) long and 2–5 cm (1–2 in) wide; it too blackens with age. The gills are off-white initially, very widely spaced, and are adnate. These turn red; then grey, and finally black, when bruised. The flesh, which has a fruity smell, when cut turns pale Indian red, and then grey, and black within 20 minutes. The spore print is white, and the warty oval spores measure 7–8 x 6–7 μm.

Old specimens are sometimes parasitised by fungi of the genus Asterophora or Nyctalis, in particular the species N. parasitica and N. asterophora (the pick-a-back toadstool).

=== Similar species ===
Species that also bruise red then black include Russula acrifolia and R. dissimulans.

Russula albonigra has closer gills and is far less common. It bruises directly to black, lacking the red intermediary phase.

== Distribution and habitat ==
Russula adusta appears in late summer and autumn in both deciduous and coniferous woodland, under conifer trees, across Britain, northern Europe, and North America. In North America, it appears in the Pacific Northwest and northern California from October to February.

== Toxicity ==
The species contains toxins which could cause gastrointestinal upset. It is used in pickling, but must be parboiled first.
