= R. nigricans =

R. nigricans may refer to:

- Rhizopus nigricans, the breadmold, a harmless mold species known to grow on bread
- Russula nigricans, the blackening brittlegill or blackening russula, a gilled mushroom species found in woodland in Europe

== See also ==
- Nigricans (disambiguation)
