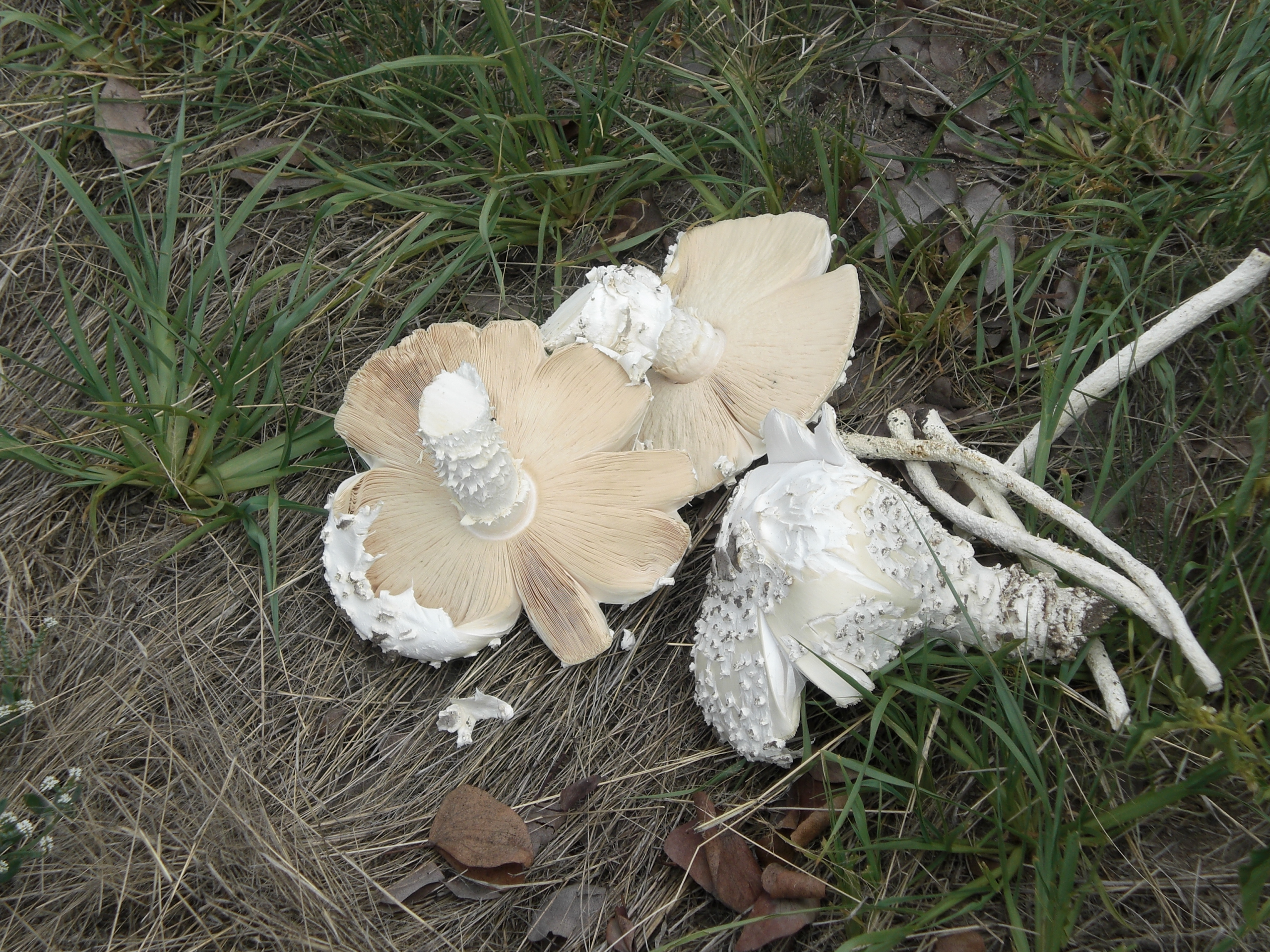

Scientific classification
- Domain: Eukaryota
- Kingdom: Fungi
- Division: Basidiomycota
- Class: Agaricomycetes
- Order: Agaricales
- Family: Lyophyllaceae
- Genus: Termitomyces
- Species: T. schimperi

Binomial name
- Termitomyces schimperi (Pat.) R.Heim (1942)

Synonyms
- Lepiota schimperi Pat. (1891)

= Termitomyces schimperi =

Species of fungus

Termitomyces schimperi is a large mushroom associated with the termite species Macrotermes michaelseni. It grows in the northern part of Southern Africa, from northern Namibia up to Democratic Republic of Congo (DRC), eastwards to Malawi and Mozambique, and westwards to Ivory Coast.

In Namibia it is commonly referred to by its Herero name Ejova (singular)/ Omajowa (plural). German Namibians refer to the mushroom as "Termitenpilz."

== Characteristics ==
Termitomyces schimperi can grow to the size of a "large frying pan". When they emerge, the fruitbody of the fungus are the "size of a man’s fist", before rapidly expanding to 15–28 cm and sometimes reaching 40 cm in diameter. The tops are white. Yellowish to red-brown discolouration of the thick soft scales may occur by the mound soil. Below the top most layer, the scales are white. The pseudorhiza (a cord-like structure resembling a plant root) is narrower at its origin in the termite nest, and may be as long as 90 cm. Its consistency above ground is less dense. The sporocarps can be seen in groups of 5–10 around the lower parts of termite mound, and grow to around 50 cm above soil level. Up to 50 sporocarps have been reported around a single mound. The Termitomyces schimperi usually appear after soaking rains of 12 mm or more during spring, but the main crop develops during January to March which is the main rainy season. If the hyphae remain in the mound when harvested, they may grow on the same termite mound for many years. The termites consume the partial veil following maturation of the fungus.

== Termite association ==
Termitomyces schimperi do not appear on all termite mounds. When present, they have been recorded on termite mounds of central and northern Namibia in areas with an average rainfall over 350 mm. The mounds can often extend to 3-4 m in height with their apices inclined towards the north. The associated termite is Macrotermes michaelseni (Sjöstedt, 1914). (This termite is recorded in some literature [See ] as "Termes bellicosus", a misapplied name, where some former subspecies are since treated as junior subjective synonyms of Macrotermes michaelseni).

In Zambia the Termitomyces schimperi can also be found on termite mounds of the termite Odontotermes patruus (Sjöstedt, 1913).

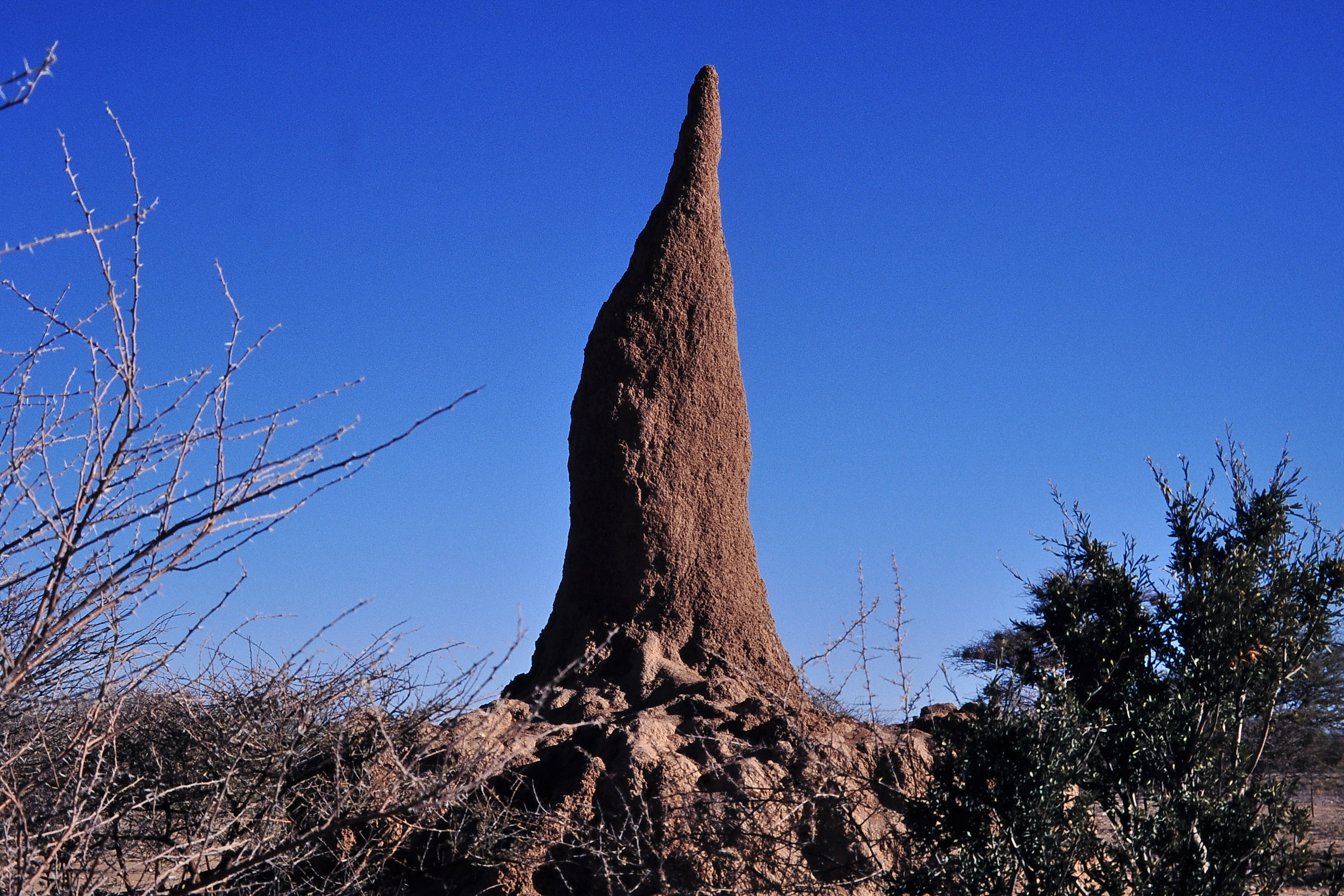
Termite mound in Namibia on which omajowa grow

== Cultural association ==
The mushroom is seen as a symbol of growth and prosperity by Namibians and is highly valued in Namibian culture. Their popularity in Africa is reflected in their appearance on postage stamps. It has high value as an edible source in the Ivory Coast.
