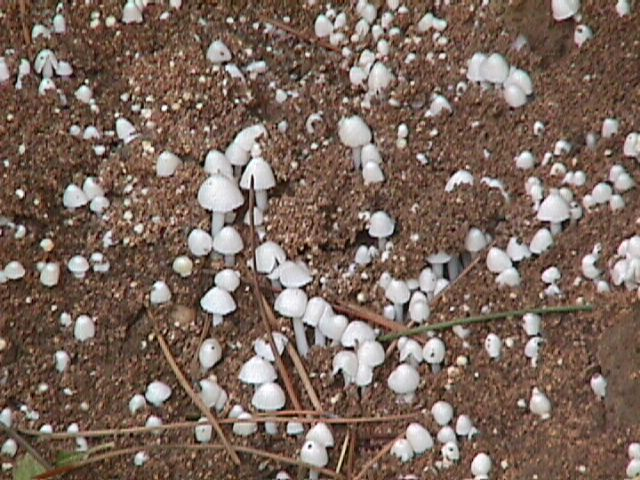

Scientific classification
- Domain: Eukaryota
- Kingdom: Fungi
- Division: Basidiomycota
- Class: Agaricomycetes
- Order: Agaricales
- Family: Lyophyllaceae
- Genus: Termitomyces
- Species: T. microcarpus

Binomial name
- Termitomyces microcarpus (Berk. & Broome) R.Heim (1942)

Synonyms
- Agaricus microcarpus Berk. & Broome (1871); Entoloma microcarpum (Berk. & Broome) Sacc. (1887); Gymnopus microcarpus (Berk. & Broome) Overeem (1927); Podabrella microcarpa (Berk. & Broome) Singer (1945); Termitomyces microcarpus (Berk. & Broome) R.Heim (1941); Termitomyces microcarpus f. santalensis R.Heim (1977)

= Termitomyces microcarpus =

Species of fungus

Termitomyces microcarpus is a species of agaric fungus in the family Lyophyllaceae. An edible species, it is found in Africa and Asia, where it grows in groups or clusters in deciduous forests near the roots of bamboo stumps associated with termite nests.

== Nutrition ==
A 2017 study which compared the amino acid profile of 13 edible wild mushrooms in Yunnan, China found that T. microcarpus had the largest amount of total amino acids as well as essential amino acids.

Termitomyces microcarpus
- Protein
- Tryptophan: 241.9 mg
- Threonine: 653.6 mg
- Isoleucine: 689.6 mg
- Leucine: 1197.3 mg
- Methionine: 180.4 mg
- Cystine: 555.5 mg
- Phenylalanine: 785.8 mg
- Tyrosine: 756.4 mg
- Valine: 971.8 mg
- Arginine: 742.0 mg
- Histidine: 357.5 mg
- Alanine: 690.9 mg
- Aspartic acid: 497.3 mg
- Glutamic acid: 1369.2 mg
- Glycine: 597.9 mg
- Proline: 521.6 mg
- Serine: 775.7 mg
Vitamins and minerals
- ^{†}Percentages estimated using US recommendations for adults, except for potassium, which is estimated based on expert recommendation from the National Academies.
