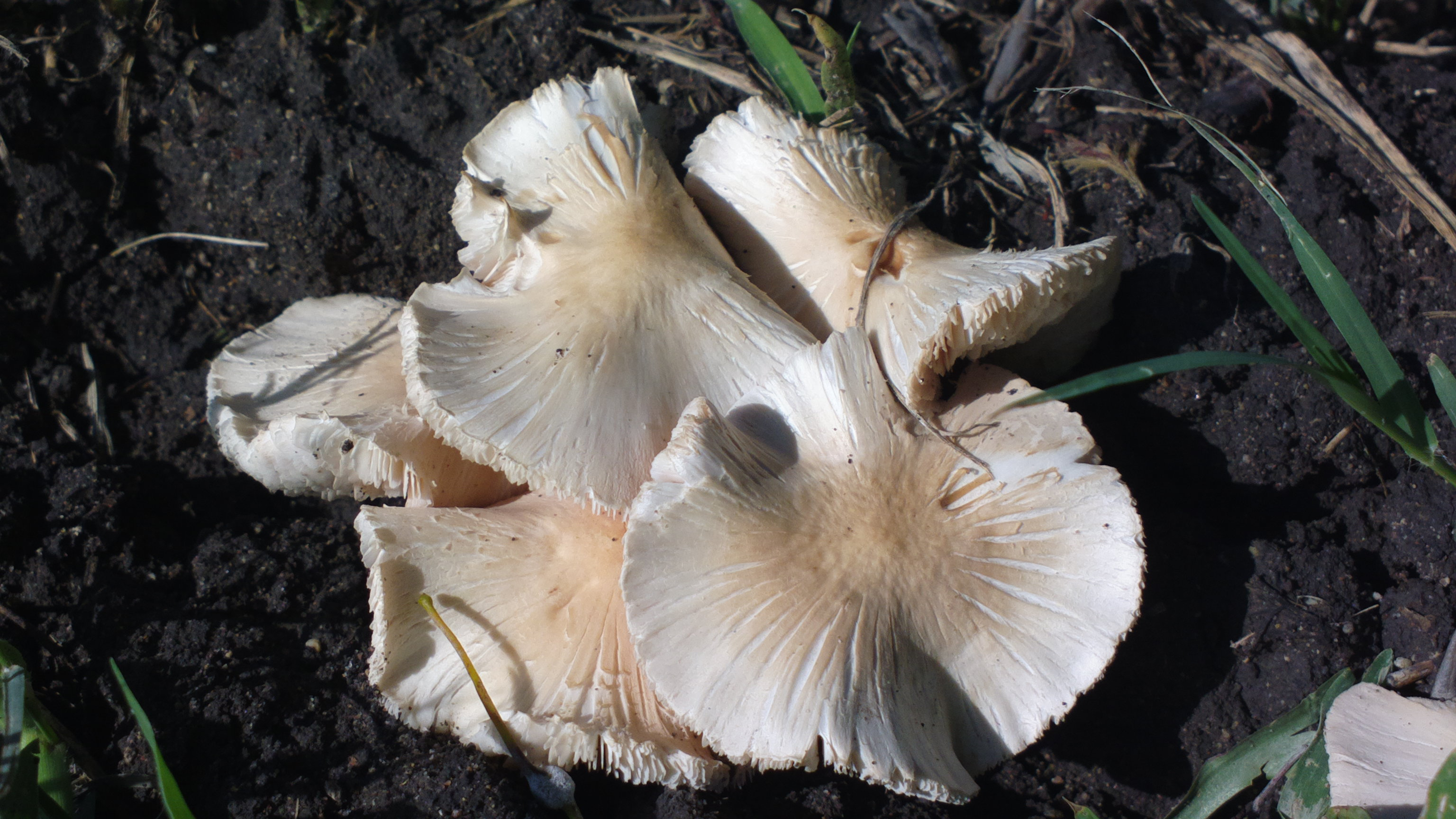

Scientific classification
- Domain: Eukaryota
- Kingdom: Fungi
- Division: Basidiomycota
- Class: Agaricomycetes
- Order: Agaricales
- Family: Lyophyllaceae
- Genus: Termitomyces
- Species: T. clypeatus

Binomial name
- Termitomyces clypeatus R.Heim (1951)

Synonyms
- Sinotermitomyces taiwanensis M.Zang & C.M.Chen (1998)

= Termitomyces clypeatus =

Species of fungus

Termitomyces clypeatus species of agaric fungus in the family Lyophyllaceae. Found in Africa, it was formally described by Roger Heim in 1951.
