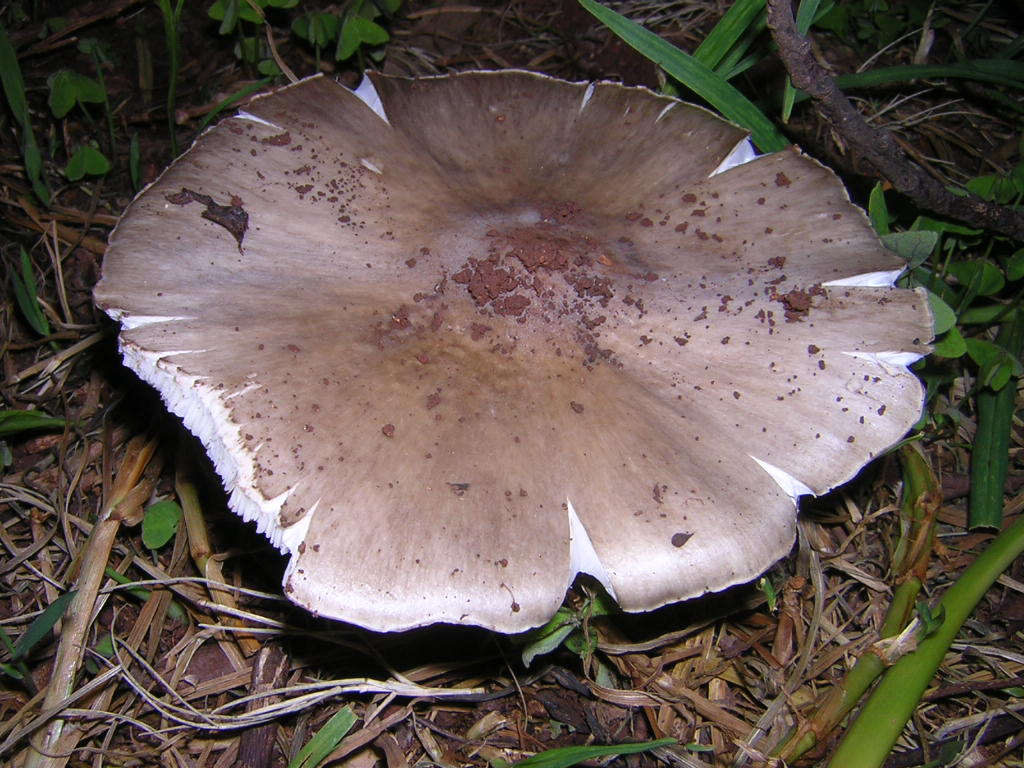

Scientific classification
- Domain: Eukaryota
- Kingdom: Fungi
- Division: Basidiomycota
- Class: Agaricomycetes
- Order: Agaricales
- Family: Lyophyllaceae
- Genus: Termitomyces
- Species: T. le-testui

Binomial name
- Termitomyces le-testui (Pat.) R.Heim (1942)

Synonyms
- Lepiota le-testui Pat. (1916)

= Termitomyces le-testui =

Species of fungus

Termitomyces le-testui is a species of agaric fungus in the family Lyophyllaceae. It was first described scientifically from Africa by French mycologist Narcisse Théophile Patouillard in 1916, and transferred to the genus Termitomyces by Roger Heim in 1942. The mushroom is edible and used as food.
