= Termitomyces robustus =

Scientific classification
- Domain: Eukaryota
- Kingdom: Fungi
- Division: Basidiomycota
- Class: Agaricomycetes
- Order: Agaricales
- Family: Lyophyllaceae
- Genus: Termitomyces
- Species: T. robustus

Binomial name
- Termitomyces robustus (Beeli) R.Heim (1951)

Synonyms
- Schulzeria robusta Beeli (1927)

Species of fungus

Termitomyces robustus is a mushroom in the genus Termitomyces. Attempts at cultivation by humans have failed in past trials.

As with all members of the genus Termitomyces, these fungi are cultivated exclusively by Termite species.
