= Phlebophyllum =

Scientific classification
- Kingdom: Fungi
- Division: Basidiomycota
- Class: Agaricomycetes
- Order: Agaricales
- Family: incertae sedis
- Genus: Phlebophyllum; R.Heim (1969)

Type species
- Phlebophyllum vitellinum R.Heim (1969)

Genus of fungi

Phlebophyllum is a genus of fungi in the order Agaricales. It is incertae sedis with respect to familial placement within the order. The genus is monotypic, containing the single species Phlebophyllum vitellinum, discovered in Gabon and reported as new to science by mycologist Roger Heim in 1969.
