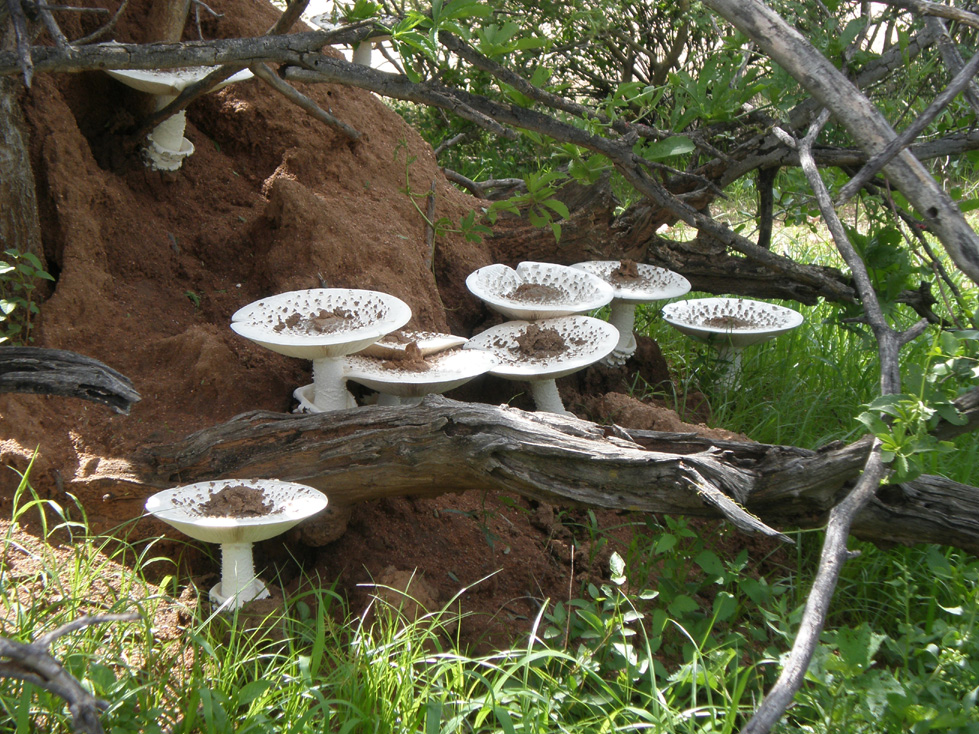

Scientific classification
- Domain: Eukaryota
- Kingdom: Fungi
- Division: Basidiomycota
- Class: Agaricomycetes
- Order: Agaricales
- Family: Lyophyllaceae
- Genus: Termitomyces
- Species: T. reticulatus

Binomial name
- Termitomyces reticulatus Van der Westh. & Eicker (1990)

= Termitomyces reticulatus =

Species of fungus

Termitomyces reticulatus is a species of agaric fungus in the family Lyophyllaceae. Found in southern Africa, it was described as new to science in 1990. It is associated with the termite species Odontotermes badius and O. transvaalensis, which are widely distributed in South Africa.
