= Termitomyces bulborhizus =

Scientific classification
- Domain: Eukaryota
- Kingdom: Fungi
- Division: Basidiomycota
- Class: Agaricomycetes
- Order: Agaricales
- Family: Lyophyllaceae
- Genus: Termitomyces
- Species: T. bulborhizus

Binomial name
- Termitomyces bulborhizus T.Z.Wei, Y.J.Yao, B.Wang & Pegler (2004)

Species of fungus

Termitomyces bulborhizus is a species of agaric fungus in the family Lyophyllaceae. Found in Sichuan, China, it was formally described in 2004. It has a large cap, up to 22 cm (8.7 in) in diameter. The specific epithet, derived from the Greek words bulbus ("bulbous") and rhizus ("root"), refers to the bulbous base of the stipe.
