= Ugola =

Scientific classification
- Kingdom: Fungi
- Division: Basidiomycota
- Class: Agaricomycetes
- Order: Agaricales
- Family: Lyophyllaceae
- Genus: Ugola; Adans.

Type species
- Ugola physaroides

Species
- U. baryana U. physaroides U. praticola

Genus of fungi

Ugola is a genus of fungi in the Lyophyllaceae family. The genus was first described scientifically by the French naturalist Michel Adanson in his 1763 Familles des Plantes. The three fungi in the genus are anamorphs of species of Asterophora, a genus of fungi that are parasitic on other mushrooms.
