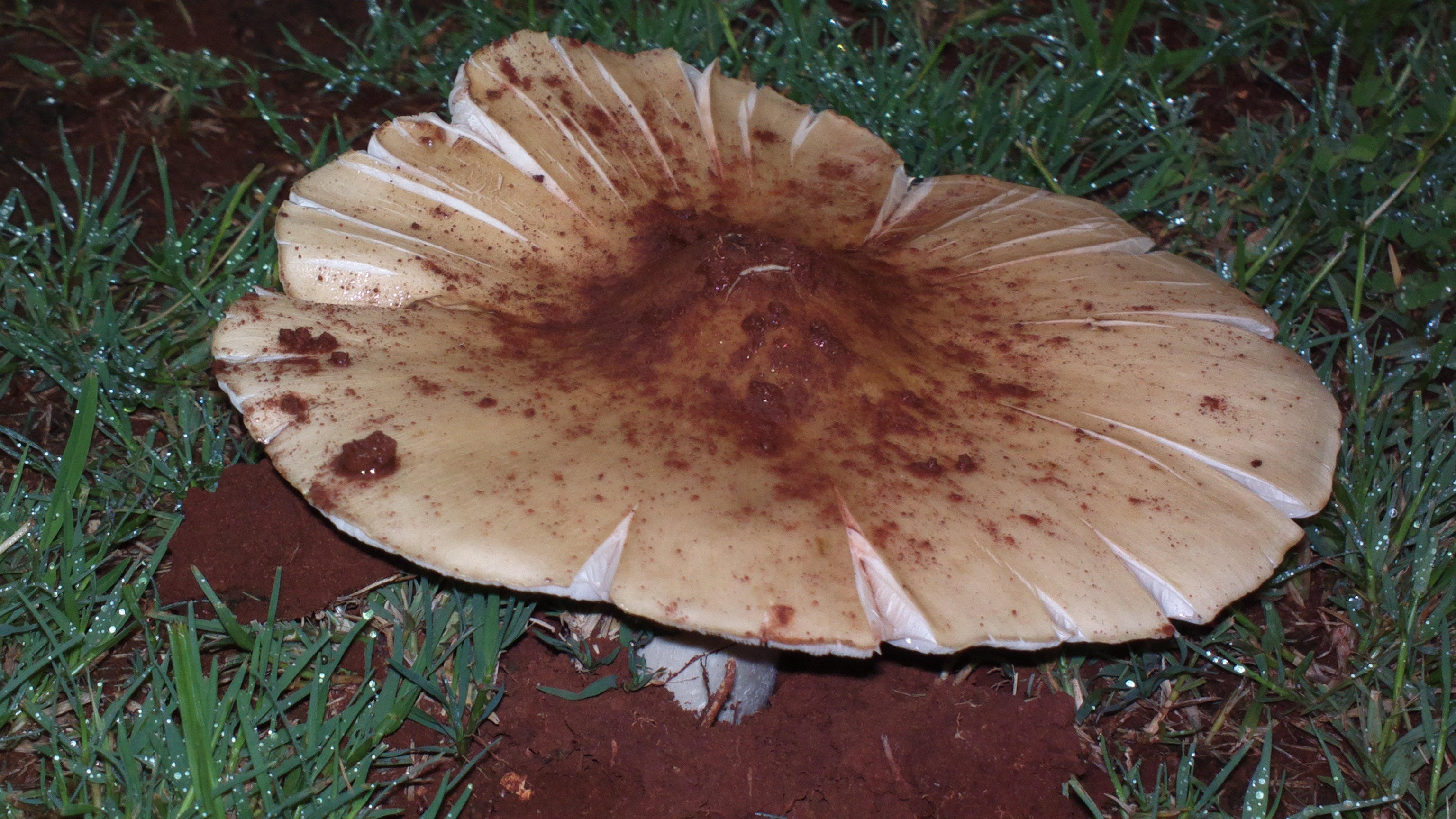

Scientific classification
- Domain: Eukaryota
- Kingdom: Fungi
- Division: Basidiomycota
- Class: Agaricomycetes
- Order: Agaricales
- Family: Lyophyllaceae
- Genus: Termitomyces
- Species: T. umkowaan

Binomial name
- Termitomyces umkowaan (Cooke & Massee) D.A.Reid (1975)

Synonyms
- Agaricus umkowaan Cooke & Massee [as 'umkowaani'] (1889); Schulzeria umkowaan (Cooke & Massee) Sacc. (1891)

= Termitomyces umkowaan =

Species of fungus

Termitomyces umkowaan is a species of agaric fungus in the family Lyophyllaceae. Found in South Africa, it was described as new to science in 1889 by Mordecai Cubitt Cooke and George Edward Massee from collections made in Durban. Cooke noted that was "called Umkowaan by the natives, and is delicious when cooked, much superior to the common mushroom." Derek Reid transferred the fungus to the genus Termitomyces in 1975.
