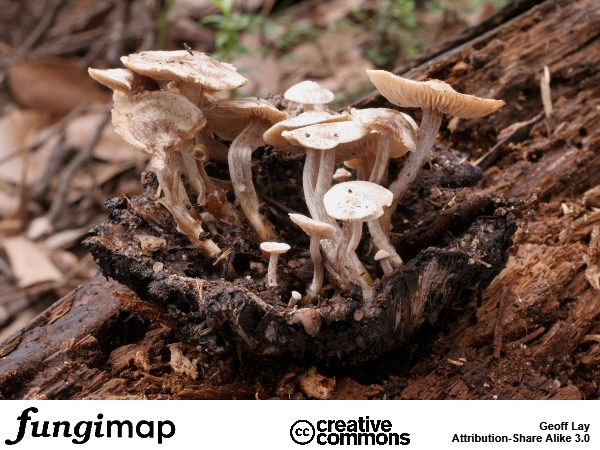

Scientific classification
- Domain: Eukaryota
- Kingdom: Fungi
- Division: Basidiomycota
- Class: Agaricomycetes
- Order: Agaricales
- Family: Lyophyllaceae
- Genus: Asterophora
- Species: A. mirabilis

Binomial name
- Asterophora mirabilis (T.W.May) Redhead & Seifert (2001)

Synonyms
- Nyctalis mirabilis T.W.May (1995)

= Asterophora mirabilis =

Species of fungus

Asterophora mirabilis is a species of fungus that grows as a parasite on mushrooms. It was originally described as Nyctalis mirabilis by Australian mycologist Tom May in 1995, and later transferred to the genus Asterophora in 2001. The fungus grows in temperate rainforests of Australia (southern Victoria and Tasmania) on decaying fruit bodies of species in the genera Russula and Lactarius.
