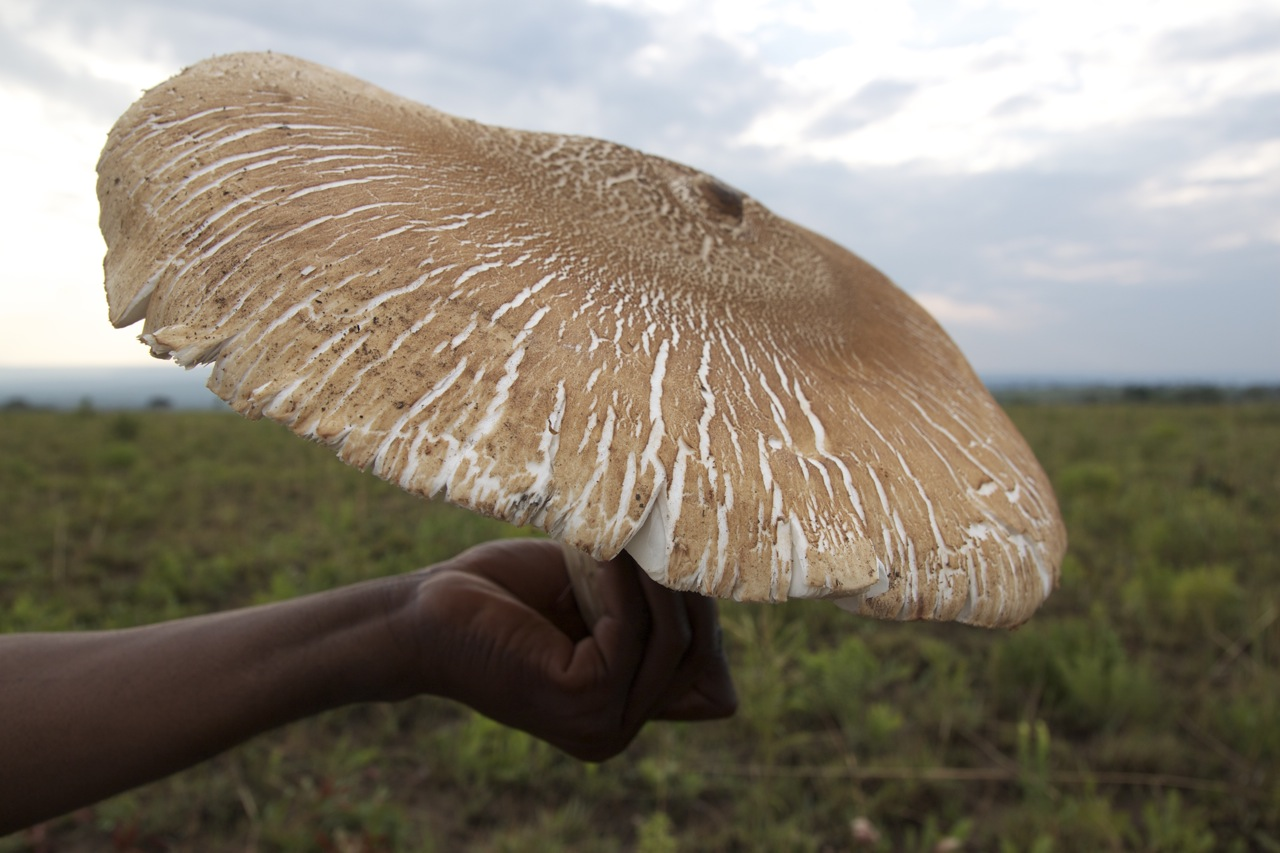

Scientific classification
- Kingdom: Fungi
- Division: Basidiomycota
- Class: Agaricomycetes
- Order: Agaricales
- Family: Lyophyllaceae
- Genus: Termitomyces
- Species: T. titanicus

Binomial name
- Termitomyces titanicus Pegler & Piearce (1980)

= Termitomyces titanicus =

Species of fungus

Termitomyces titanicus (common name chi-ngulu-ngulu) is a species of edible fungus in the Lyophyllaceae family. Found in West Africa (as well as Zambia and the Katanga Province of DR Congo), it has a cap that may reach 1 metre (3 ft) in diameter on a stipe up to 57 centimetres (22 inches) in length. Termitomyces is symbiotic with termites of the genus Macrotermes who raise the hyphae upon partially digested leaves as their primary foodstuff. T. titanicus was first described by David Pegler and G. D. Piearce in the Kew Bulletin in 1980; they described it as "incredible that such a large fungus which is popularly known and common in Zambia should have remained undescribed" until that point.

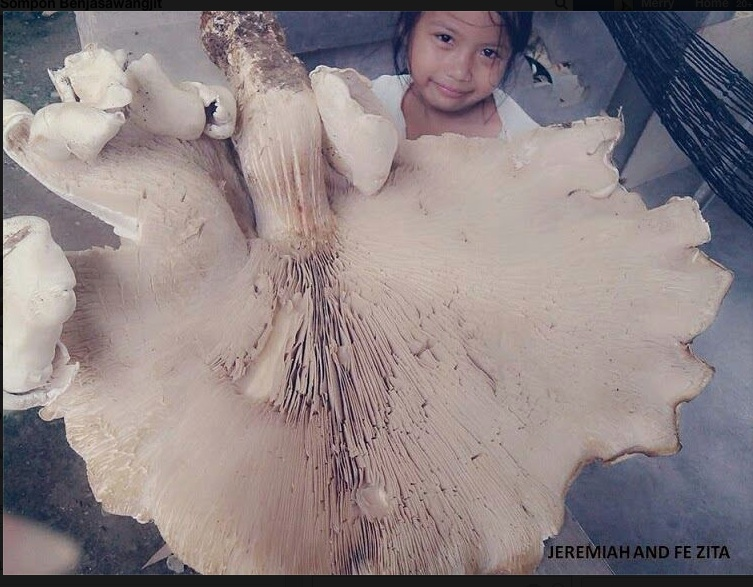
A Termitomyces titanicus found in Mindanao, Philippines in 2014.
