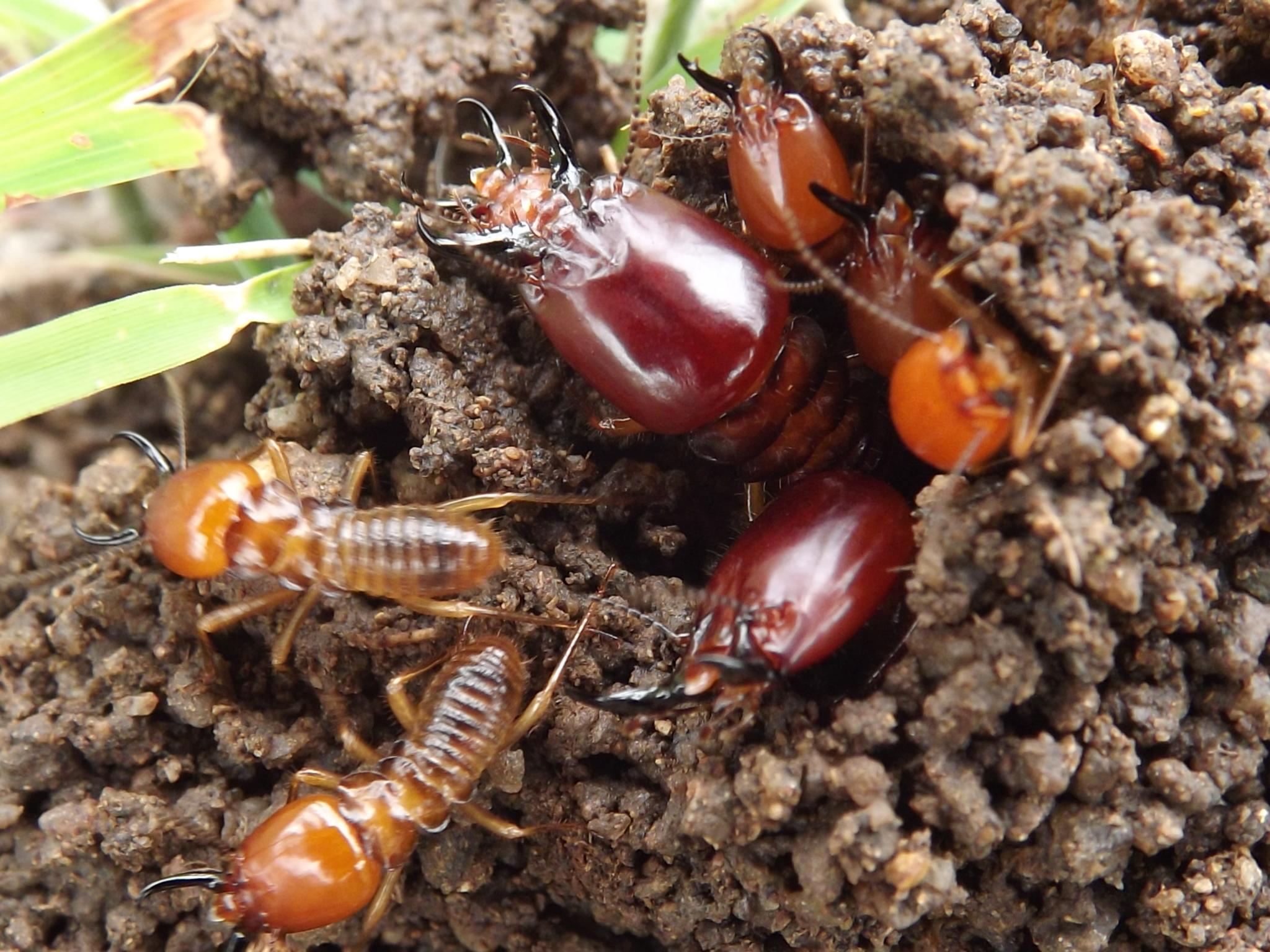

Scientific classification
- Kingdom: Animalia
- Phylum: Arthropoda
- Clade: Pancrustacea
- Class: Insecta
- Order: Blattodea
- Infraorder: Isoptera
- Family: Termitidae
- Genus: Macrotermes
- Species: M. michaelseni

Binomial name
- Macrotermes michaelseni (Sjöstedt, 1914)

Synonyms
- Macrotermes bellicosus kunenensis Fuller, 1922; Macrotermes bellicosus limpopoensis Fuller, 1922; Termes (Termes) bellicosus mossambica Hagen, 1858; Macrotermes bellicosus tonga Fuller, 1927

= Macrotermes michaelseni =

Species of termite

Macrotermes michaelseni is a species of termite in the family Termitidae, found in sub-Saharan Africa. It is associated with the fungus Termitomyces schimperi.

== Distribution and habitat ==
Macrotermes michaelseni is one of several different species of the genus Macrotermes which occur in savannahs in sub-Saharan Africa. These species vary in their soil preferences, some favoring moister habitats, but M. michaelseni can be more tolerant of drier habitats. The species is common in the Okavango Delta in northern Botswana, especially in catchment areas that sees periodic flooding from summer rains. Areas with clay soils and high groundwater levels are favourable to it, and there are up to six mounds per hectare in the delta area.

== Colony structure ==
Nests of Macrotermes michaelseni initially consists of a number of chambers and tunnels completely underground. A mound is built above the ground only in a mature colony, which in time can become an enormous structure, with ridges, pinnacles and chimneys, up to 4 m (13 ft) tall covering an area of up to 50 m^{2} (540 ft^{2}). Below the surface of the ground is an extensive network of chambers and foraging passageways. Apart from the sealed mound, with its air passages, the colony lives largely underground, the workers using the foraging tunnels to access feeding areas and carry the food they collect back to the nest.

== Ecology ==
The termite workers forage at night, gathering dead grass, grass litter and woody litter. In savannah woodland, leaves from Croton megalocarpus, Philenoptera violacea, Vachellia erioloba and Colophospermum mopane forms the bulk of the leaf litter collected, with elephant dung being favoured at the end of the dry season. The vegetation is carried back to the nest along the foraging passageways both day and night, where it is chewed up by younger workers. They mould their faeces and deposit them on a comb structure on which fungi grow. When the comb is eaten by the termites, the fungal spores pass through their gut to complete the cycle by germinating in the fresh faecal pellets.

The fungus which is associated with M. michaelseni is Termitomyces schimperi. The fruiting bodies, with their large, white, scaly caps, are found growing above ground at the base of the termite mound. They appear after heavy rain, and reappear annually beside the same mound, the hyphae extending down to the termite nest beneath the ground.

In the Okavango Delta, M. michaelseni is considered to be an ecosystem engineer. A mature colony may contain over a million termites including nymphs, workers and soldiers. Material is collected from a radius of fifty metres or more around the nest and brought to a central location where nutrients are thus concentrated. Clay particles are also collected for mound-building, and the area close to the mound is gradually raised slightly above the surrounding flat land. The delta is subject to occasional flooding, and when this happens, the mounds and their low islands project above the surface of the water. The colony of termites below may be killed, but there is a tendency for new colonies to become established at the same location. The mounds are a favourable habitat for herbs and woody plants to grow, with their associated invertebrates and other animals, and biodiversity increases.
