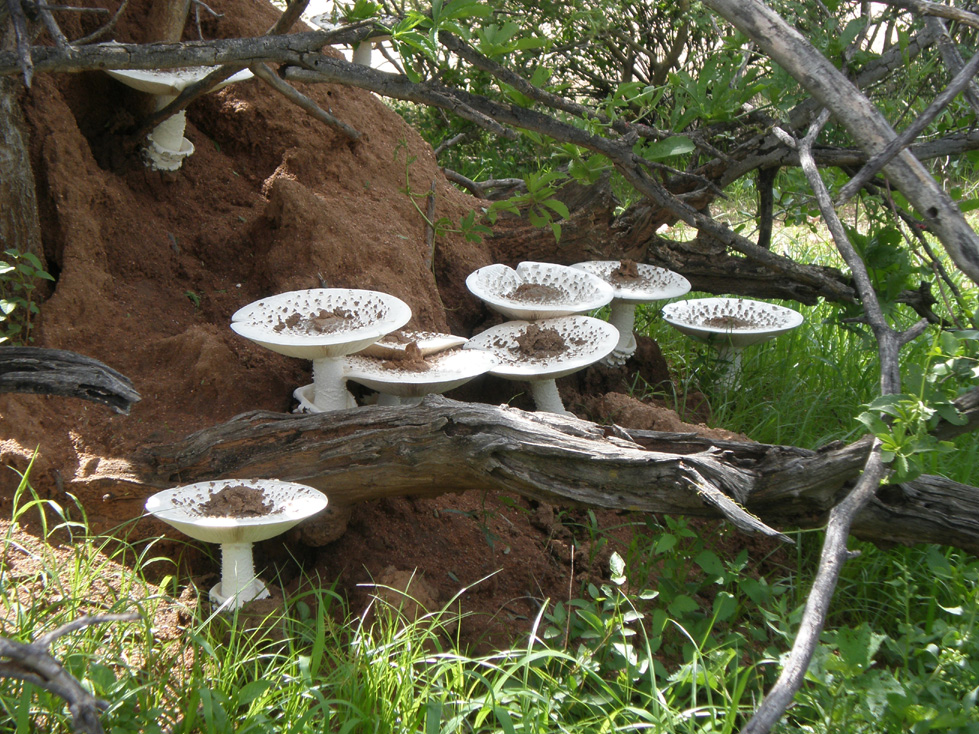
- Termitomyces reticulatus

Scientific classification
- Kingdom: Fungi
- Division: Basidiomycota
- Class: Agaricomycetes
- Order: Agaricales
- Family: Lyophyllaceae
- Genus: Termitomyces; R.Heim, 1942

Type species
- Termitomyces striatus (Beeli) R.Heim

Synonyms
- 1945 Podabrella Singer; 1945 Rajapa Singer; 1981 Sinotermitomyces M.Zang

= Termitomyces =

Genus of fungi

Termitomyces is a genus of basidiomycete fungi known as termite mushrooms in Lyophyllaceae family farmed by fungus-growing termites. (Note: Also known as fungus-farming termites.) The fungi and the termites interdepend to live, as the termites house and culture the fungi, and the fungi in turn provide foods for the termites. Often after a raining, the fungi grow mushrooms, which are edible and highly regarded for their flavor.

== Morphology ==
Termitomyces includes the largest edible mushroom in the world, Termitomyces titanicus of West Africa and Zambia, whose cap reaches 1 metre (3.28 ft) in diameter. It also includes Termitomyces microcarpus that grows caps of a few centimeters in diameter.

== Life as a Termitomyces fungus ==
=== Comb-associated saprotrophy ===
Some chamber(s) of the fungus-growing termite nest each contains an object, called comb or fungus garden, where the fungus dwells. The comb is formed from the termites' excreta – the termites collect and chew up dead wood, leaf litter and other vegetable debris, depositing their primary faeces, which contain asexual Termitomyces spores the termites previously consumed, as new portions of the fungus garden. The spores comes from another object the termites consumed – little balls that grow on the comb called spherules. (Note: Also known as mycotêtes or nodules.) Thereafter, the Termitomyces fungus grows through the comb. Old combs are eaten by termites as well.

=== Opportunist antagonist Pseudoxylaria ===
Fungi of Pseudoxylaria (termite-associated Xylaria, a subgenus of Xylaria) are found in fungus-growing termite combs. Suppressed by fungus-growing termites, they flourish at the price of the Termitomyces fungus when the termite nest is deteriorating or deserted.

=== Reproduction ===
When a new termite colony is established, in most cases, the Termitomyces fungus is introduced through the activities of the termites collecting spores from the environment. For spreading spores, the Termitomyces fungus forms mushrooms. For most species, the fungus grows rooting stipes (pseudorhizas) to the surface of the ground, where mushrooms are formed. For Termitomyces microcarpus, the mushrooms grow from fungus garden fragments that are carried outside the nest by worker termites. On the other hand, Termitomyces cryptogamus is not found to grow a mushroom in nature. (Note: Occasionally, T. cryptogamus grow mushrooms when pieces of fungus garden are lab-incubated.)

== Research history ==
Termitomyces was described by Roger Heim in 1942.

From 1955 to 1969 Arthur French worked in Uganda (as a hobby) on the subject of fungi and termites. Some scientific literature about these fungal species existed previously, but these texts failed to adequately discuss the relationship between termites and their fungal symbiotes, while the various edible varieties were merely termed "termite mushrooms." French conducted some investigations with the help of the elderly Baganda women who gathered termite mushrooms, and published his findings.

== Culinary use ==
In the Philippines, they are highly-prized and are foraged regularly during the rainy season since ancient times, alongside other edible local mushroom species. They are associated with termite mounds (punso) and are known under various different names including kabuting punso (lit. "termite mound mushroom") and mamarang in Tagalog; ohong or ohom in Cebuano; and o-ong in various Cordilleran languages.

They are foraged in Malaysia, known as cendawan busut ("mound mushroom"). Tamil rubber tappers in Selangor long time ago would find a lot of T. schimperi growing in estate environments not long after raining. They are widely eaten across India.

== Lookalikes ==
Many cases of mushroom poisoning in Malaysia happen because Chlorophyllum molybdites look similar to Termitomyces fungi.

== Species ==
Species of Termitomyces included in Species Fungorum, 52 as of July 2023, are enumerated.

1. Termitomyces acriumbonatus Usman & Khalid (2020)
2. Termitomyces albidus (Singer) L.D. Gómez (1995)
3. Termitomyces aurantiacus (R. Heim) R. Heim (1977)
4. Termitomyces biyi Otieno (1966)
5. Termitomyces bulborhizus T.Z. Wei, Y.J. Yao, Bo Wang & Pegler (2004)
6. Termitomyces citriophyllus R. Heim (1942)
7. Termitomyces clypeatus R. Heim (1951)
8. Termitomyces congolensis (Beeli) Singer (1948)
9. Termitomyces dominicalensis L.D. Gómez (1995)
10. Termitomyces entolomoides R. Heim (1951)
11. Termitomyces epipolius (Singer) L.D. Gómez (1995)
12. Termitomyces eurrhizus (Berk.) R. Heim (1942)
13. Termitomyces floccosus S.M. Tang, Raspé & S.H. Li (2020)
14. Termitomyces fragilis L. Ye, Karun, J.C. Xu, K.D. Hyde & Mortimer (2019)
15. Termitomyces fuliginosus R. Heim (1942)
16. Termitomyces gilvus C.S. Yee & J.S. Seelan (2020)
17. Termitomyces globulus R. Heim & Gooss.-Font. (1951)
18. Termitomyces griseiumbo Mossebo (2003)
19. Termitomyces heimii Natarajan (1979)
20. Termitomyces indicus Natarajan (1976)
21. Termitomyces infundibuliformis Mossebo (2012)
22. Termitomyces intermedius Har. Takah. & Taneyama (2016)
23. Termitomyces lanatus R. Heim (1977)
24. Termitomyces le-testui (Pat.) R. Heim (1942)
25. Termitomyces magoyensis Otieno (1966)
26. Termitomyces mammiformis R. Heim (1942)
27. Termitomyces mboudaeinus Mossebo (2003)
28. Termitomyces mbuzi Härkönen & Niemelä (2021)
29. Termitomyces medius R. Heim & Grassé (1951)
30. Termitomyces microcarpus (Berk. & Broome) R. Heim (1942)
31. Termitomyces narobiensis Otieno (1966)
32. Termitomyces perforans R. Heim (1977)
33. Termitomyces poliomphax (Singer) L.D. Gómez (1995)
34. Termitomyces rabuorii Otieno (1966)
35. Termitomyces radicatus Natarajan (1977)
36. Termitomyces reticulatus Van der Westh. & Eicker (1990)
37. Termitomyces robustus (Beeli) R. Heim (1951)
38. Termitomyces sagittiformis (Kalchbr. & Cooke) D.A. Reid (1975)
39. Termitomyces schimperi (Pat.) R. Heim (1942)
40. Termitomyces sheikhupurensis Izhar, Khalid & H. Bashir (2020)
41. Termitomyces singidensis Saarim. & Härk. (1994)
42. Termitomyces songolarum (Courtec.) Furneaux (2020)
43. Termitomyces spiniformis R. Heim (1977)
44. Termitomyces srilankensis Ediriweera, Voto, Karun. & Kularathne (2023)
45. Termitomyces striatus (Beeli) R. Heim (1942)
46. Termitomyces subclypeatus Mossebo (2003)
47. Termitomyces subumkowaan Mossebo (2003)
48. Termitomyces titanicus Pegler & Piearce (1980)
49. Termitomyces tylerianus Otieno (1966)
50. Termitomyces umkowaan (Cooke & Massee) D.A. Reid (1975)
51. Termitomyces upsilocystidiatus S.M. Tang, Raspé & K.D. Hyde (2020)

=== Reidentified as external ===
1. Macrolepiota albuminosa (Berk.) Pegler (1972) / Termitomyces albuminosus (Berk.) R.Heim (1941)
  — The original specimens were identified as termite mushrooms by Petch (1912). However, this identification failed to take their microscopic morphology into account. In a position outside the Termitomyces genus; identified by Pegler (1986) as the same species as Leucocoprinus cepistipes.
52. Sinotermitomyces meipengianus M. Zang & D.Z. Zhang (2004) / Termitomyces meipengianus (M. Zang & D.Z. Zhang) P.M. Kirk (2014)
53. — In a position outside the Termitomyces genus; likely in Xerula, Oudemansiella or a position nearby.

== See also ==
- Fungus-growing ants
- Fungus-growing beetle
- Non-human agriculture
