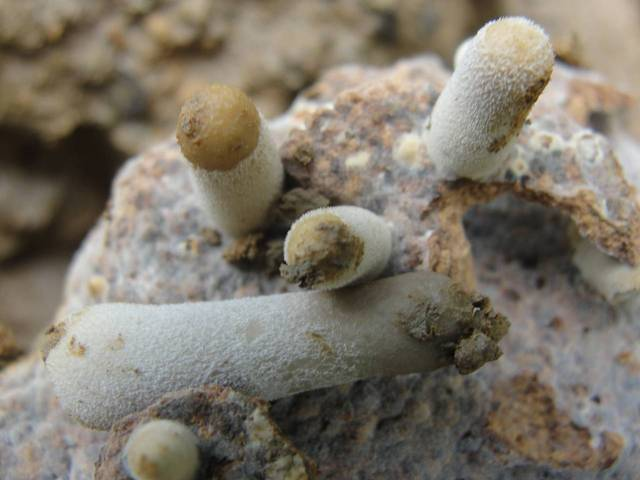

Scientific classification
- Kingdom: Fungi
- Division: Basidiomycota
- Class: Agaricomycetes
- Order: Agaricales
- Family: Lyophyllaceae
- Genus: Termitomyces
- Species: T. heimii

Binomial name
- Termitomyces heimii Natarajan (1979)

= Termitomyces heimii =

Species of fungus

Termitomyces heimii is a species of agaric fungus in the family Lyophyllaceae. It has symbiotic relationship with termites. Described as new to science in 1979, it is found in India. The specific epithet heimii honors French mycologist Roger Heim. The fruit bodies (mushrooms) produced by the fungus are edible.

== Description ==
=== Macroscopic features ===
The cap has a diameter of 8 to 12.5 centimeters with a smooth, silky white surface. It is gray in the middle, and turns brownish over time. It is arched convex to flat arched (plano-convex) with a distinct hump. The edge is curved. The up to 8 millimeters wide lamellae are free, white, turns pink over time with a sawn edge. Lamellettes are available. The stem is up to 19 inches long and up to 2 inches thick, white, smooth, cylindrical, not hollow with a pronounced ring. It is extended like a root (pseudorhiza).

=== Microscopic features ===
The hyphae in the pulp are interwoven, thick-walled and up to 18 micrometers wide. The top layer of the hat consists of radially arranged hyphae up to 5 micrometers thick. The basidia are club-shaped, 19.5 to 21 micrometers long and 5.5 to 7 micrometers wide and have 2 to 4 sterigms. Pleurocystidia are rare, if present they are club-shaped, 46 by 18 micrometers in size. The spores are elliptical, smooth, translucent, inamyloid, and grow to 7 to 8.4 by 4.2 to 5.6 micrometers in size. There are no buckles. The spore print is pink.

== Ecology ==
Like other Termitomyces species, the fungus lives symbiotically in and on termite nests. It can be found on forests as well as cocoa, oil palm and rubber tree plantations, and also in gardens, orchards and pastures where termites of the genus Odontotermes occur. It grows in groups, often with more than 300 specimens, rooted in a single termite nest that can accommodate up to 40 or more mushroom chambers. The termites literally breed the mushroom, plant mushroom gardens and use it as food. The gardens are laid out in special chambers using excrement pills containing spores. The mycelium grows through the substrate (the accumulations of feces), and after a few weeks the fungus begins to form vegetative nodules that serve as food for the termites.

== Distribution ==
Termitomyces heimii is common in South Asia.

== Systematics and taxonomy ==
Termitomyces heimii was first described by K. Natarajan in 1979 . He found it on the Madras University campus. The specific epithet honors the French mycologist Roger Heim. The generic name refers to the close association of the fungus with termites.

== Use as food ==
Termitomyces heimii is considered to be one of the most sought-after wild mushrooms. It is mainly collected and sold in India, China, Malaysia and Nepal.
