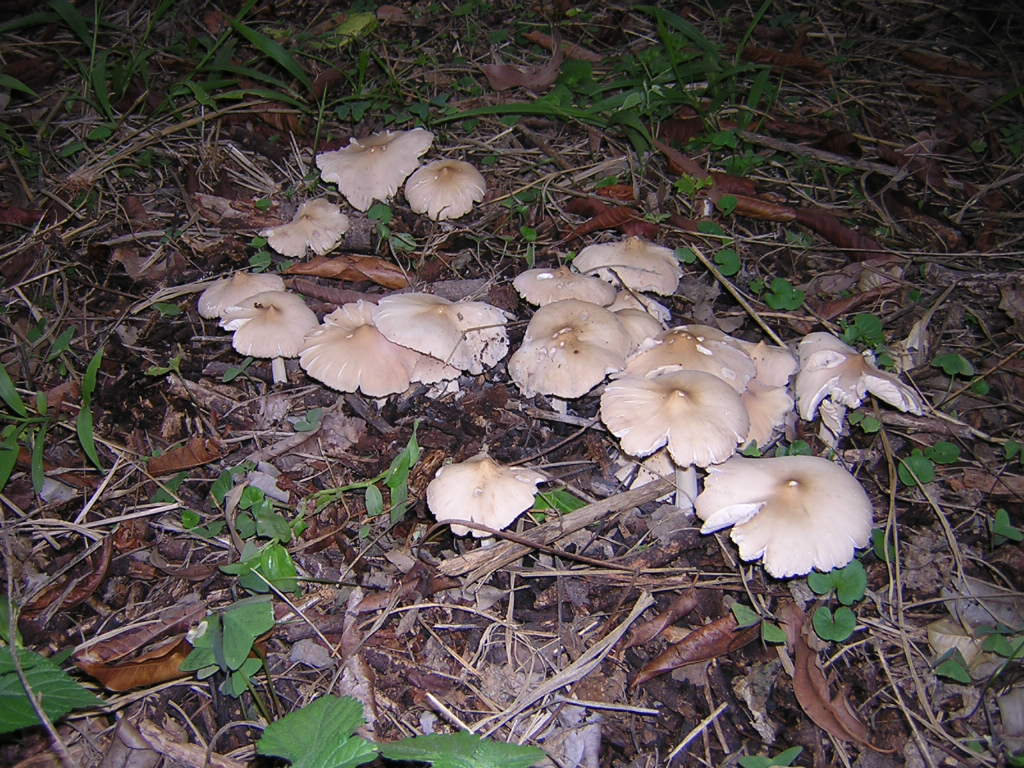

Scientific classification
- Domain: Eukaryota
- Kingdom: Fungi
- Division: Basidiomycota
- Class: Agaricomycetes
- Order: Agaricales
- Family: Lyophyllaceae
- Genus: Termitomyces
- Species: T. tylerianus

Binomial name
- Termitomyces tylerianus Otieno (1964)

= Termitomyces tylerianus =

Species of fungus

Termitomyces tylerianus is a species of agaric fungus in the family Lyophyllaceae. Found in Africa and China, it was first formally described in 1964. Fruit bodies (mushrooms) grow in groups or clusters near termite nests in deciduous forests. The mushrooms are edible.
