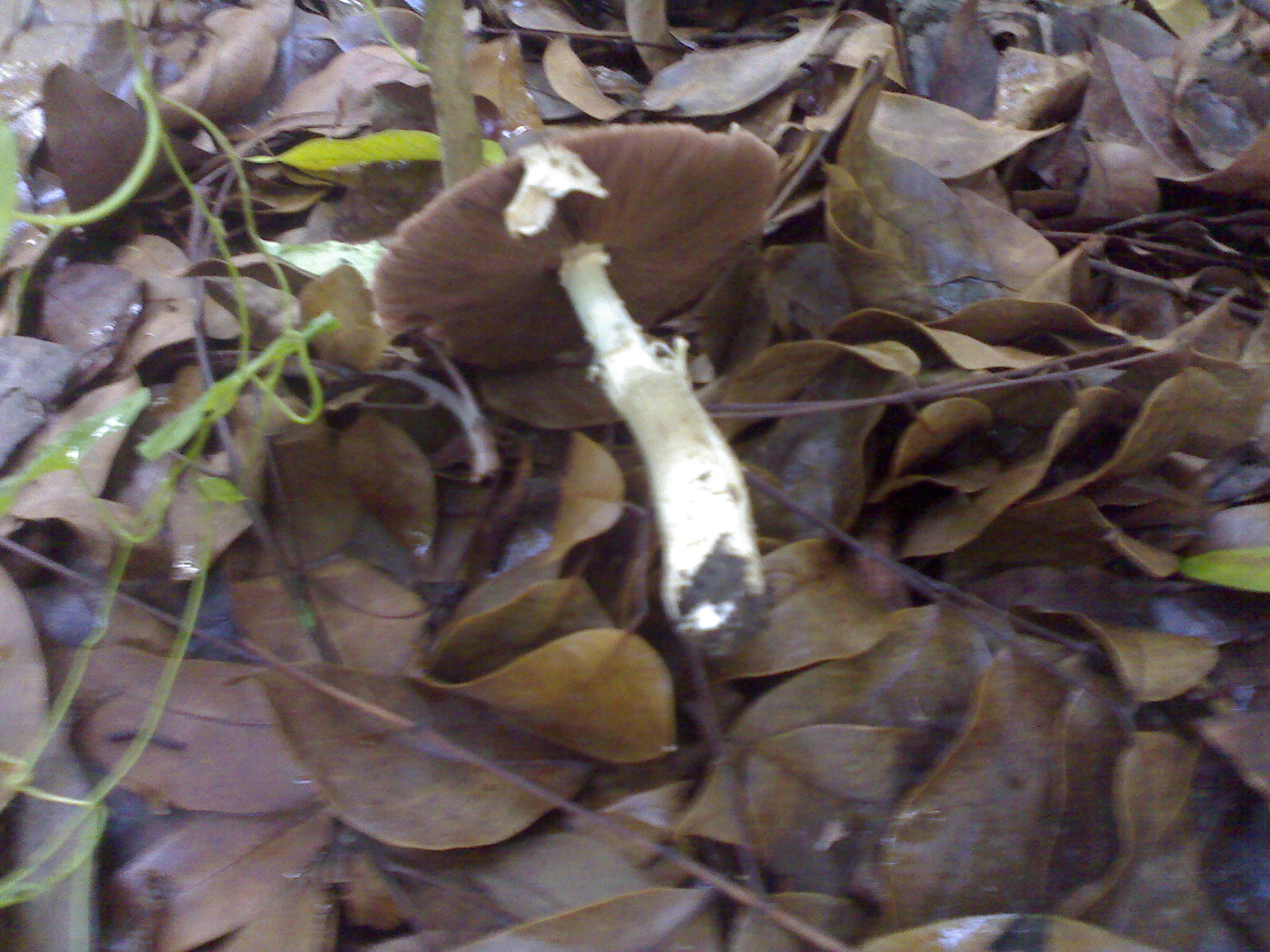

Scientific classification
- Domain: Eukaryota
- Kingdom: Fungi
- Division: Basidiomycota
- Class: Agaricomycetes
- Order: Agaricales
- Family: Lyophyllaceae
- Genus: Termitomyces
- Species: T. eurrhizus

Binomial name
- Termitomyces eurrhizus (Berk.) R.Heim (1942)

Synonyms
- Agaricus eurrhizus Berk. (1847)

= Termitomyces eurrhizus =

Species of fungus

Termitomyces eurrhizus species of agaric fungus in the family Lyophyllaceae native to Pakistan, India, Sri Lanka, Burma, southwestern China and Malaysia. The fungus has a symbiotic relationship with termites, its mushrooms growing out of mounds after periods of rainfall. It is eaten in Malaysia and the Indian subcontinent.

== Taxonomy ==
Miles Joseph Berkeley named the fungus in 1847 as Agaricus eurrhizus, from material collected in Peradeniya in Sri Lanka. French botanist Roger Heim reclassified the species as Termitomyces eurrhizus in 1942. Its place in Termitomyces was confirmed with a 2000 ribosomal DNA study showing that the termite mushrooms form a clade.

== Description ==
The cap is from 6–15 cm across, with rare specimens up to 24 cm in diameter. Grey-brown and fading to whitish at the margins, the cap is initially convex before expanding out with a central boss. The crowded white gills are free to subadnate. The ringless stout white stem is up to 20 cm high and 1.5 to 2.5 cm across. It continues into the soil. The spore print is pink, and the oval spores are 6.8–9.3 μm long by 5.1–6.8 μm wide.

== Distribution, habitat and ecology ==
Widely distributed, T. eurrhizus has been recorded from Pakistan, India, Sri Lanka, Burma, southwestern China and Malaysia. Like other members of the genus, the mushrooms grow out of termite mounds. T. eurrhizus is associated with the termite species Macrotermes gilvus in Selangor, Malaysia, and Odontotermes badius in Sri Lanka. The fungus and the termites have a complex symbiotic relationship. The termites cultivate the fungus on plant material within the mound, which they eat. The nutrients in their food are made more digestible by the fungus. After rain, the fungus is triggered into producing large mushrooms that grow and spread spores elsewhere.

== Consumption ==
In October 1972, it was recorded as being sold in markets in Midnapore in West Bengal. In the northern Malaysian state of Kedah, it is eaten by locals and known as cendawan kaki lembu "cattle leg mushroom".
