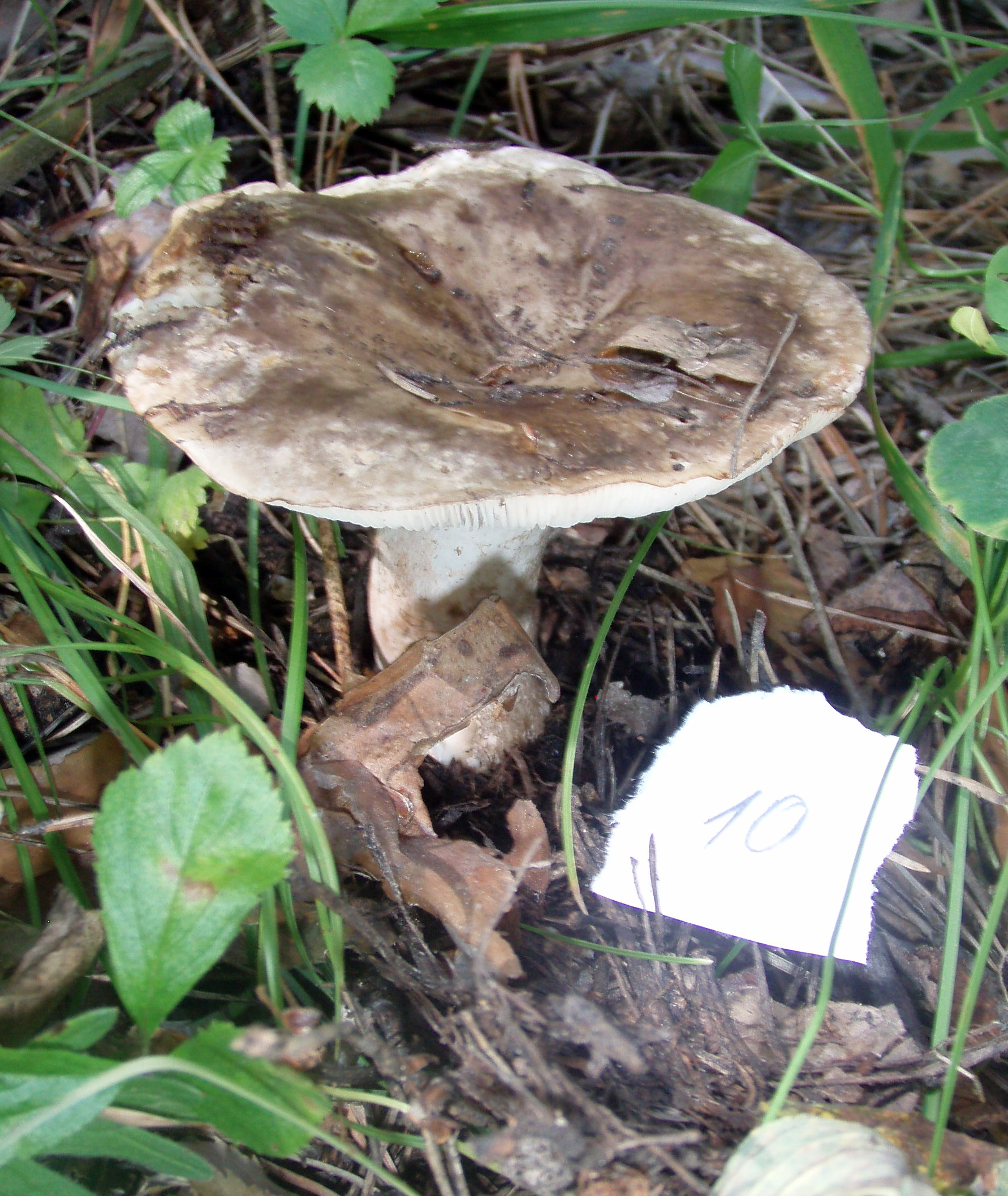
- From Atamanovo, Krasnoyarsk Krai, Russia

Scientific classification
- Kingdom: Fungi
- Division: Basidiomycota
- Class: Agaricomycetes
- Order: Russulales
- Family: Russulaceae
- Genus: Russula
- Species: R. acrifolia

Binomial name
- Russula acrifolia Romagn. (1997)

Synonyms
- Russula acrifolia Romagn. (1962)

= Russula acrifolia =

Species of fungus

Russula acrifolia is a species of mushroom. Its cap is coloured grey to blackish-grey; the cap becomes red when it is injured, but then turns blackish-gray. It is edible and described as having an acrid taste. It grows on rich soils.

== Distribution ==
Russula acrifolia is a holarctic species that needs a temperate climate. The species is spread in the Caucasus, Siberia, Korea and Japan, Northern America, Northern Africa and Europe.

== Ecological properties ==
Russula acrifolia is a mycorrhizal mushroom for different trees. Its favourite symbionic partners are Fagus sylvatica and spruce. If those are not available, it can also form symbiotic partnerships with larix, pines, betula, oaks and tilia.

== See also ==
- List of Russula species
