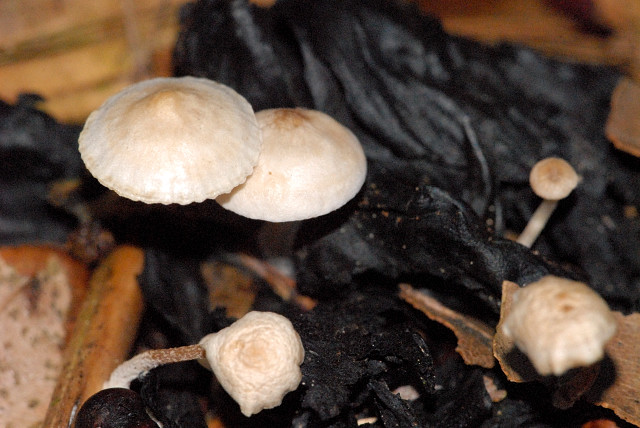
- Asterophora parasitica

Scientific classification
- Domain: Eukaryota
- Kingdom: Fungi
- Division: Basidiomycota
- Class: Agaricomycetes
- Order: Agaricales
- Family: Lyophyllaceae
- Genus: Asterophora; Ditmar (1809)

Type species
- Asterophora lycoperdoides (Bull.) Ditmar (1809)

Species
- A. lycoperdoides A. mirabilis A. parasitica A. salvaterrensis

Synonyms
- Asterosperma Pers. (1818); Nyctalis Fr. (1825); Stellifera Léman (1827)

= Asterophora =

Genus of fungi

Asterophora is a genus of fungi that grow as parasites on mushrooms. The genus contains four species, which have a widespread distribution, especially in temperate areas. The most recently described species, A. salvaterrensis, was found in Pinus pinaster forests in Galicia (northwest Iberian Peninsula). Asterophora species are characterized by the massive production of chlamydospores in their fruit bodies and by the production of carminophilous lysosomes in their basidia. A frequently used but synonymous genus name is Nyctalis. The chlamydospores have been classified in the genus Ugola, which is an anamorphic name.
