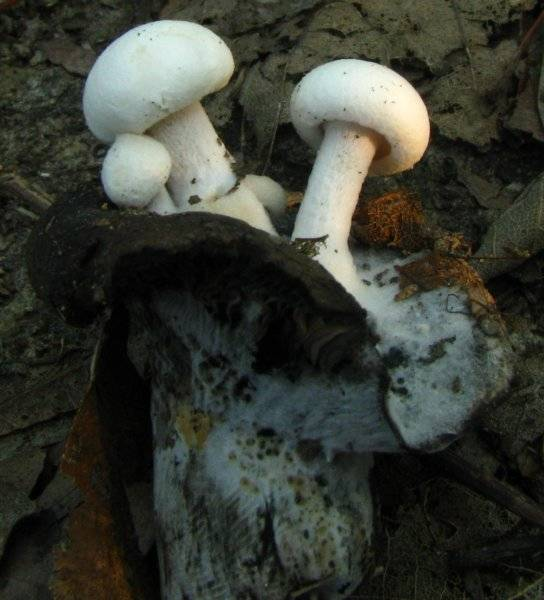

Scientific classification
- Kingdom: Fungi
- Division: Basidiomycota
- Class: Agaricomycetes
- Order: Agaricales
- Family: Lyophyllaceae
- Genus: Asterophora
- Species: A. lycoperdoides

Binomial name
- Asterophora lycoperdoides (Bull.) Ditmar

Synonyms
- Species synonymy: 1784 Agaricus lycoperdoides Bull.; 1840 Asterophora agaricicola Corda; 1818 Asterophora agaricoides Fr. & Nordholm; 1989 Nyctalis agaricoides (Fr.) Bon & Courtec.; 1849 Artotrogus asterophora Fr.; 1851 Asterotrichum ditmarii Bonord.; 1805 Merulius lycoperdoides (Bull.) Lam. & DC.; 1889 Nyctalis lycoperdoides (Bull.) J.Schröt.; 1898 Artotrogus lycoperdoides (Bull.) Kuntze; 1898 Hypolyssus lycoperdoides (Bull.) Kuntze; 1933 Nyctalis asterophora f. major J.E.Lange; 1836 Asterophora nauseosa Weinm.; 1874 Nyctalis nauseosa (Weinm.) Fr.; 1995 Nyctalis agaricoides f. nauseosa (Weinm.) Bon

= Asterophora lycoperdoides =

Species of fungus

Asterophora lycoperdoides Mycological characteristics
- Gills on hymenium
- Cap is convex
- Hymenium attachment is irregular or not applicable
- Stipe is bare
- Spore print is white
- Ecology is parasitic
- Edibility is inedible

Asterophora lycoperdoides, commonly known as the star bearer, or powdery piggyback mushroom, is a species of fungus in the Lyophyllaceae family. It grows as a parasite, mostly on Russula species, and is found in North America and Europe.

== Taxonomy ==
The species was first named as Agaricus lycoperdonoides by French mycologist Jean Baptiste Francois Pierre Bulliard in 1784.

== Description ==
The cap is white but soon covered in brown powder, growing up to 2 centimetres (3/4 in) wide. The gills are adnate and fairly distant, sometimes forked. The stems are up to 5 cm (2 in) long.

Asexual spores are produced on the mushrooms cap which enable the organism to clone itself easily. The spores, called chlamydospores, are star-shaped, hence the name 'star bearer'. It is regarded as nonpoisonous but inedible.

Asterophora parasitica is similar but has more conic caps, its gills are typically more developed, and its chlamydospores are fusiform rather than star-shaped.

== Habitat and distribution ==
It grows as a parasite on other mushrooms, mainly those in the genus Russula. It can be found from July to September in eastern North America, somewhat later on the West Coast. It can be found August to November in temperate Europe, and can be locally common.
