= Asterotremella albida =

Scientific classification
- Kingdom: Fungi
- Division: Basidiomycota
- Class: Agaricomycetes
- Order: Trichosporonales
- Family: Trichosporonaceae
- Genus: Asterotremella
- Species: A. albida

Binomial name
- Asterotremella albida C. Ramírez (1957)

Synonyms
- Cryptococcus ramirezgomezianus

Species of fungus

Asterotremella albida is a species of fungus first described by C. Ramírez in 1957. It is also referred to as Cryptococcus ramirezgomezianus.
