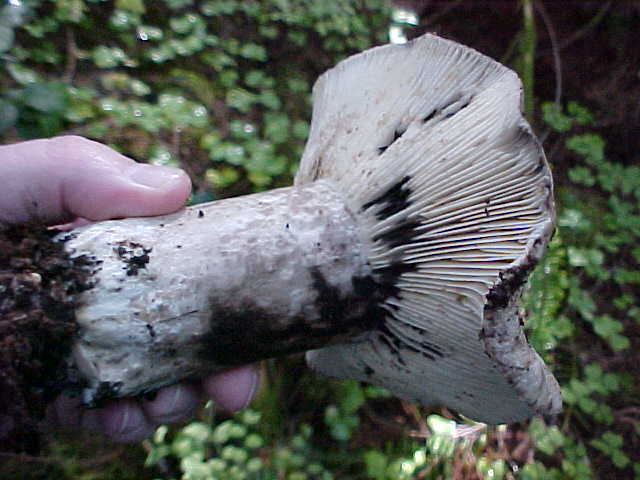

Scientific classification
- Domain: Eukaryota
- Kingdom: Fungi
- Division: Basidiomycota
- Class: Agaricomycetes
- Order: Russulales
- Family: Russulaceae
- Genus: Russula
- Species: R. albonigra

Binomial name
- Russula albonigra (Krombh.) Fr., 1874

= Russula albonigra =

Species of fungus

Russula albonigra Mycological characteristics
- Gills on hymenium
- Cap is convex or infundibuliform
- Hymenium is decurrent
- Stipe is bare
- Spore print is white
- Ecology is mycorrhizal
- Edibility is not recommended

Russula albonigra, commonly known as the blackening russula, is a member of the genus Russula, all of which are collectively known as brittlegills. Its consumption is recommended against.

== Taxonomy ==
First described by the mycologist Julius Vincenz von Krombholz in 1838, its specific epithet comes from Latin albus and niger, which mean white and black.

== Description ==
The cap is up to 20 centimetres (8 in) wide, convex to infundibuliform, whitish then blackening, and sometimes viscous. The stipe is up to 13 cm (5 in) long, dusky, or white above, pale grey-ochreous towards the base. The gills are decurrent, crowded, thick, unequal, connected by veins, dusky whitish or yellowish. The flesh is white, turns black or sooty. The taste is somewhat bitter and unpleasant to mild.

== Habitat and distribution ==
It grows under hardwood and conifer trees in North America, being found in such places as the Pacific Northwest.

== Uses ==
It may be possible to eat if cooked thoroughly, but is of little interest and resembles a poisonous species.

== See also ==
- List of Russula species
