= Angucycline =

Class of antibiotics

Chemical structure of saquayamycin A

Angucyclines are antibiotics isolated from Streptomyces species, which are used in chemotherapy as cytostatics against various types of cancer. The angucyclines include for example aquayamycin, the landomycins, moromycins, saquayamycins, urdamycins, and vineomycins.

== See also ==
- Anthracyclines
