= Landomycinone =

Names
- IUPAC name (6R)-1,6,8,11-Tetrahydroxy-3-methyl-5,6-dihydro-7,12-tetraphenedione

Identifiers
3D model (JSmol)	Interactive image
ChEBI	CHEBI:70059
ChEMBL	ChEMBL1668765
ChemSpider	26387866
PubChem CID	51354812
CompTox Dashboard (EPA)	DTXSID001336400
- InChI: InChI=1S/C19H14O6/c1-7-4-8-6-12(23)16-17(13(8)11(22)5-7)19(25)15-10(21)3-2-9(20)14(15)18(16)24/h2-5,12,20-23H,6H2,1H3/t12-/m1/s1 Key: DMGKSWBAQZKXEJ-GFCCVEGCSA-N; InChI=1/C19H14O6/c1-7-4-8-6-12(23)16-17(13(8)11(22)5-7)19(25)15-10(21)3-2-9(20)14(15)18(16)24/h2-5,12,20-23H,6H2,1H3/t12-/m1/s1 Key: DMGKSWBAQZKXEJ-GFCCVEGCBR
- SMILES: Cc1cc2c(c(c1)O)C3=C([C@@H](C2)O)C(=O)c4c(ccc(c4C3=O)O)O

Properties
Chemical formula	C_{19}H_{14}O_{6}
Molar mass	338.311
- Except where otherwise noted, data are given for materials in their standard state (at 25 °C [77 °F], 100 kPa). Infobox references

Landomycinone is the aglycone of the landomycins.
