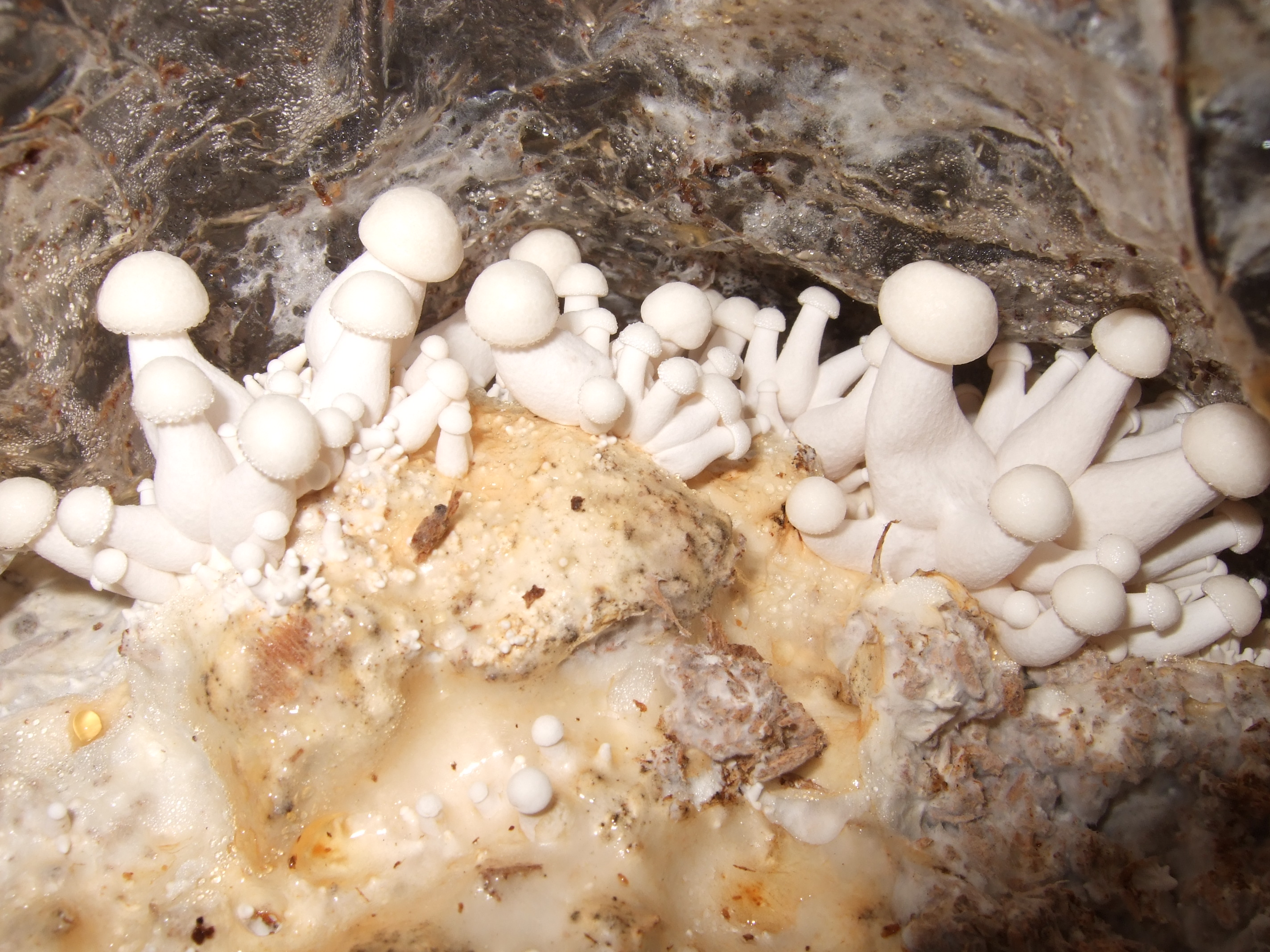
- Hypsizygus tessulatus

Scientific classification
- Kingdom: Fungi
- Division: Basidiomycota
- Class: Agaricomycetes
- Order: Agaricales
- Family: Lyophyllaceae
- Genus: Hypsizygus; Singer

Type species
- Hypsizygus tessulatus (Bull.) Singer

Species
- Hypsizygus ligustri Hypsizygus marmoreus Hypsizygus tessulatus Hypsizygus ulmarius

= Hypsizygus =

Genus of fungi

Hypsizygus is a small genus of fungi that are widely distributed in north temperate regions. The genus was circumscribed by Rolf Singer in 1947. The common name for Hypsizygus ulmarius is the elm oyster mushroom.

The genus contains the species H. tessulatus, one of the shimeji mushrooms in Japanese cuisine.

The ITS DNA barcode of these morphospecies are close enough to be considered the same species.

Fungi of this genus have been recorded as occasional food of the pleasing fungus beetle Dacne quadrimaculata.
