= Entoloma decastes =

Scientific classification
- Kingdom: Fungi
- Division: Basidiomycota
- Class: Agaricomycetes
- Order: Agaricales
- Family: Entolomataceae
- Genus: Entoloma
- Species: E. decastes

Binomial name
- Entoloma decastes Contu, Cons. & Noordel. (2009)

Species of mushroom-forming fungus

Entoloma decastes is a rare species of agaric fungus in the family Entolomataceae. It was first described in 2009 from coastal dune grassland in Sardinia, Italy, where it grows in dense clusters. The fruit bodies have a dark, translucent‑striated cap when moist, crowded gills that turn pinkish as the spores mature, and distinctive multi‑angled spores typical of the genus.

== Taxonomy ==
Entoloma decastes was formally described by Marco Contu, Giovanni Consiglio and Machiel Noordeloos in Mycotaxon in 2009. The species epithet decastes alludes to its superficial resemblance to the unrelated cluster‑forming fungus Lyophyllum decastes. Morphological and microscopic characters place it in the subgenus Rhodopolia of the large genus Entoloma.

== Description ==
The cap (pileus) measures 10–50 mm across and is thin, fleshy and convex at first, later flattening with a shallow central depression. When young and moist, the margin becomes clearly translucent and shows radial striations. The surface is glabrous (smooth and hairless), silky and dark brown with a blackish centre, often lightening slightly towards the edge. The gills (lamellae) are crowded, sine‑adnate (notched where they join the stipe) or somewhat decurrent (running slightly down the stipe), and change from greyish to pinkish brown as the spores develop.

The stipe is 10–30 mm long and 2–3 mm thick, cylindrical and hollow in maturity. Young stipes bear a white, powdery bloom (pruina) at the apex and fine longitudinal fibrils below; this bloom wears off with age, leaving a smooth surface. All tissues are thin and watery, remaining unchanged when cut. The odour and taste are faintly mealy (farinaceous).

Microscopically, the basidiospores measure about 11–14 by 9–12 μm and are angular with 6–8 sides, a hallmark of the genus. The flesh shows abundant clamp connections and dark intracellular pigment in the cap skin.

== Habitat and distribution ==
Entoloma decastes is known only from a sandy, acidic grassland on coastal dunes near Aglientu (Montirussu locality) in the Province of Olbia-Tempio (Sardinia, Italy). Collections were made on 26 December 2005, 2 January 2006 and 23 November 2007, always in dense clusters on the open grassland soil. No records exist outside this region.

== See also ==
- List of Entoloma species
