= Moromycins =

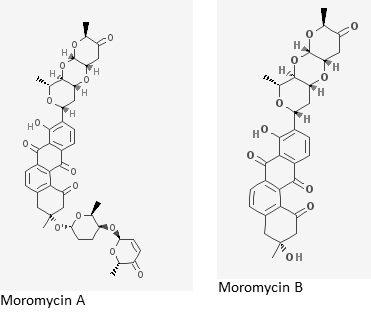
Moromycin A and B

Moromycins are anticancer antibiotics of the angucycline class.
