= Streptomyces nodosus =

Scientific classification
- Domain: Bacteria
- Kingdom: Bacillati
- Phylum: Actinomycetota
- Class: Actinomycetia
- Order: Streptomycetales
- Family: Streptomycetaceae
- Genus: Streptomyces
- Species: S. nodosus

Binomial name
- Streptomyces nodosus Trejo 1961

Subspecies
- Streptomyces nodosus subsp. asukaensis

Species of bacterium

Streptomyces nodosus is a bacterial species in the genus Streptomyces.

== Uses ==
Streptomyces nodosus is used to produce amphotericin B.

Saquayamycins (saquayamycins A, B, C and D) are antibiotics of the aquayamycin group found in S. nodosus cultures broth.
