= Shimeji =

Mushroom

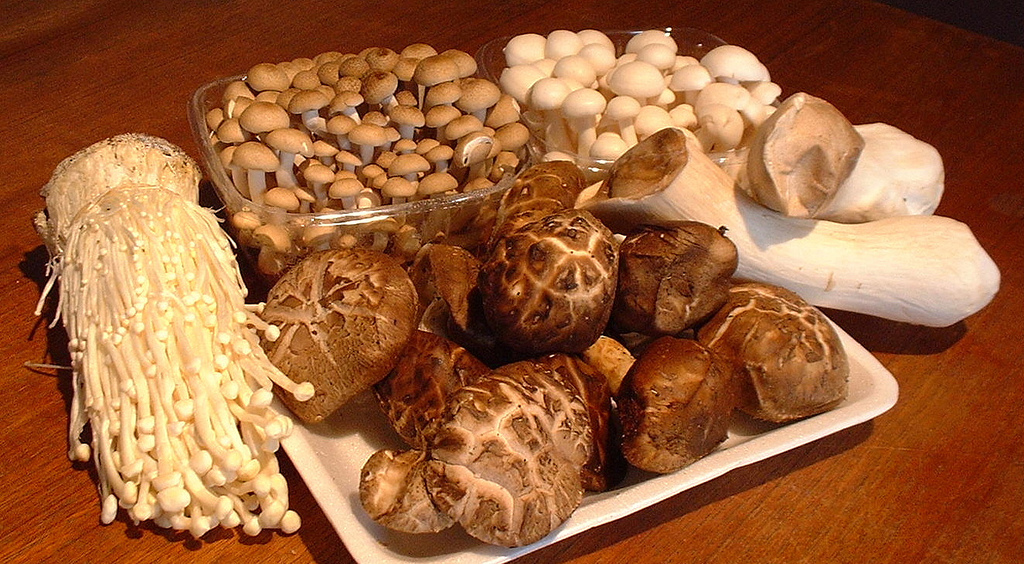
Japanese popular mushrooms, clockwise from left, enokitake, buna-shimeji, bunapi-shimeji, king oyster mushroom and shiitake (front).

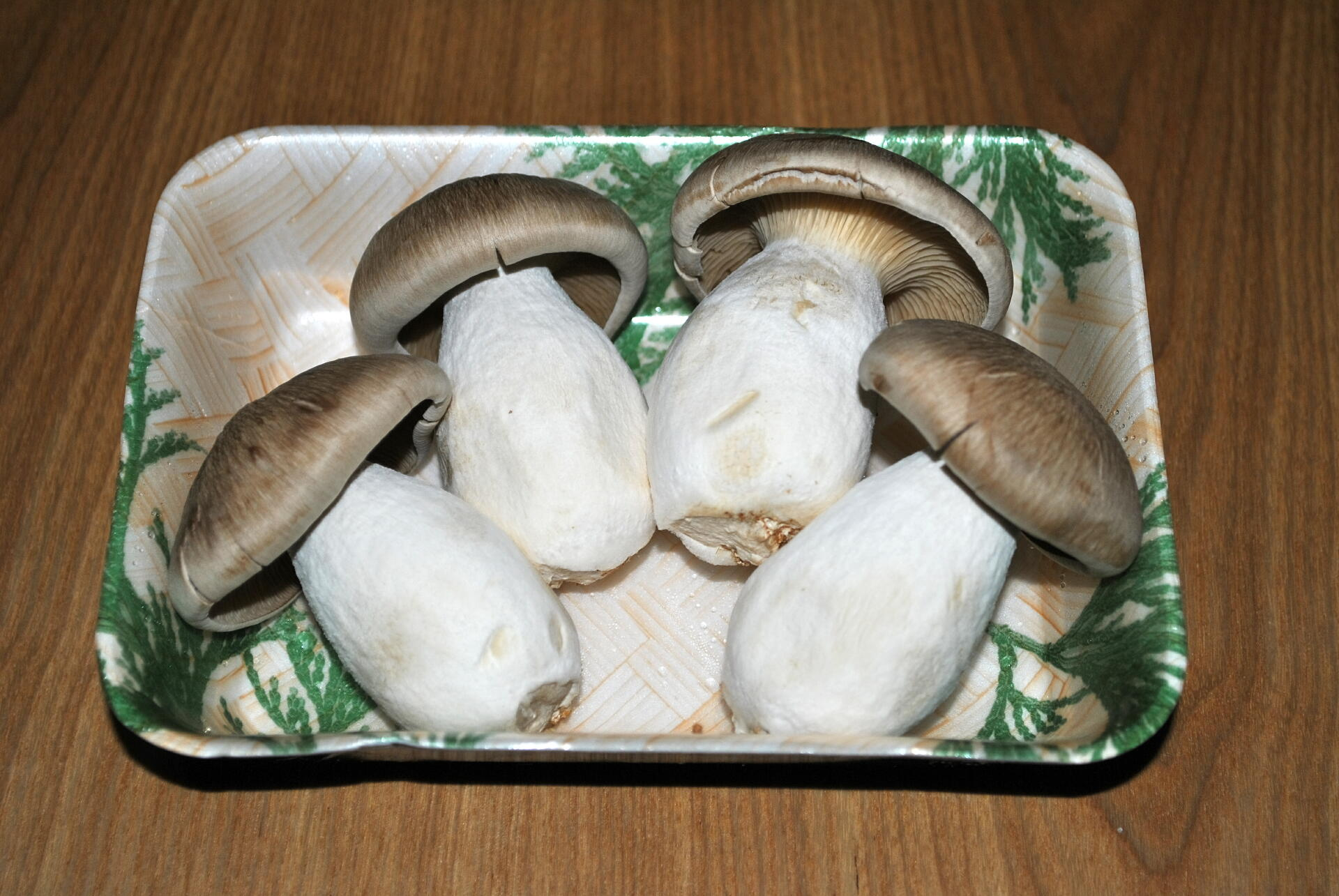
Lyophyllum shimeji

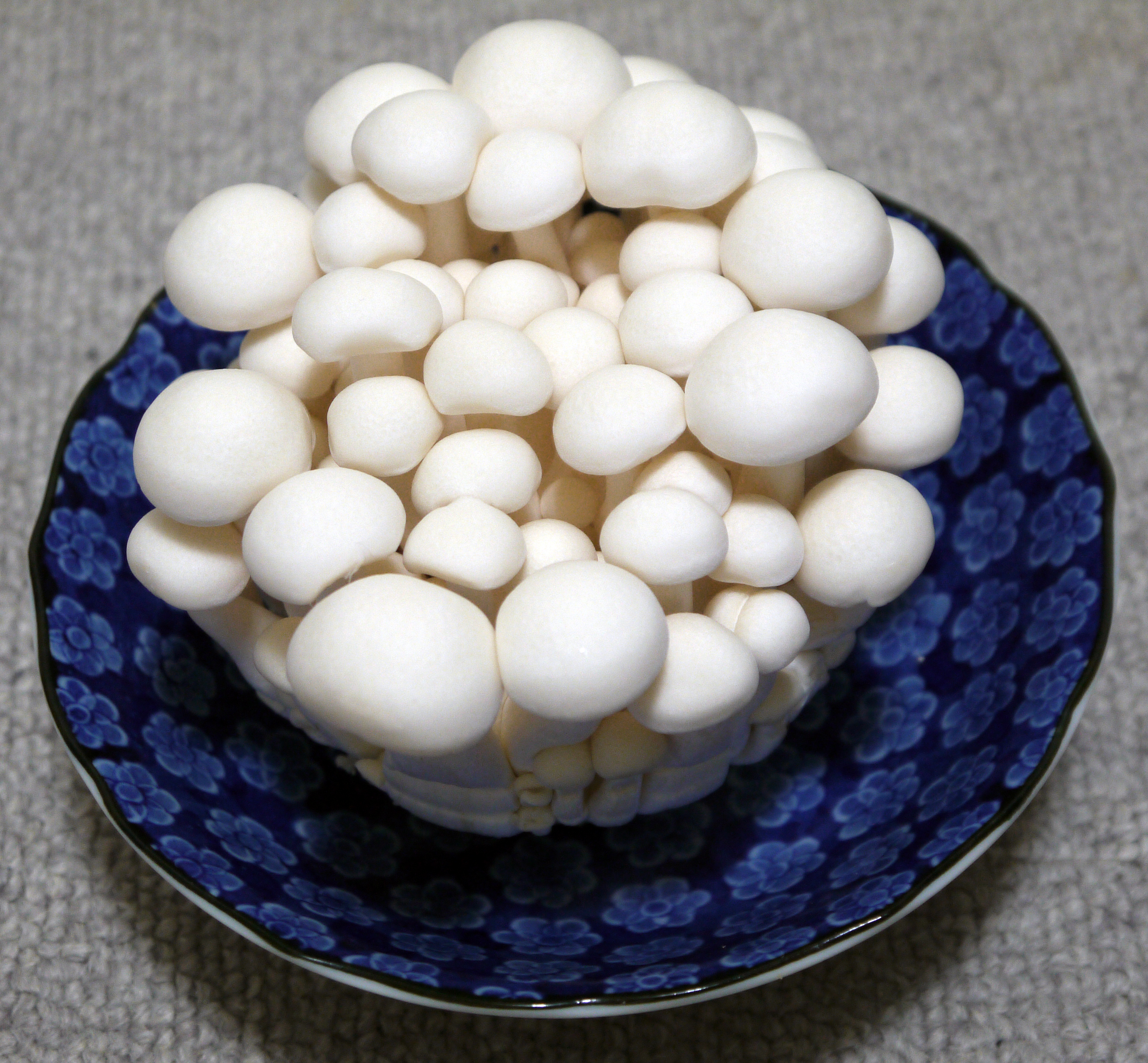
Bunapi (developed by Hokuto Corporation)

Shimeji (Japanese: シメジ, 占地 or 湿地) is a group of edible mushrooms native to East Asia, but also found in northern Europe. Hon-shimeji (Lyophyllum shimeji) is a mycorrhizal fungus and difficult to cultivate. Other species are saprotrophs, and buna-shimeji (Hypsizygus tessulatus) is now widely cultivated. Shimeji is rich in umami-tasting compounds such as guanylic acid, glutamic acid, and aspartic acid.

== Species ==
Several species are sold as shimeji mushrooms. All are saprotrophic except Lyophyllum shimeji.

=== Mycorrhizal ===
- Hon-shimeji (ホンシメジ), Lyophyllum shimeji

The cultivation methods have been patented by several groups, such as Takara Bio and Yamasa, and the cultivated hon-shimeji is available from several manufacturers in Japan.

=== Saprotrophic ===
- Buna-shimeji (ブナシメジ, lit. beech shimeji), Hypsizygus tessulatus, also known in English as the brown beech or brown clamshell mushroom.
  Hypsizygus marmoreus is a synonym of Hypsizygus tessulatus. Cultivation of Buna-shimeji was first patented by Takara Shuzo Co., Ltd. in 1972 as hon-shimeji and the production started in 1973 in Japan. Now, several breeds are widely cultivated and sold fresh in markets.
- Bunapi-shimeji (ブナピー), known in English as the white beech or white clamshell mushroom.
  Bunapi was selected from UV-irradiated buna-shimeji ('hokuto #8' x 'hokuto #12') and the breed was registered as 'hokuto shiro #1' by Hokuto Corporation.
- Hatake-shimeji (ハタケシメジ), Lyophyllum decastes.
- Shirotamogidake (シロタモギダケ), Hypsizygus ulmarius.
  These two species had been also sold as hon-shimeji.
- Velvet pioppino (alias velvet pioppini, black poplar mushroom, Chinese: 茶樹菇/茶树菇), Agrocybe aegerita.

== Nutrition ==
Shimeji mushrooms contain minerals like potassium and phosphorus, magnesium, zinc, and copper. Shimeji mushrooms lower the cholesterol level of the body. This mushroom is rich in glycoprotein (HM-3A), marmorin, beta-(1-3)-glucan, hypsiziprenol, and hypsin therefore is a potential natural anticancer agent. Shimeji mushrooms contain angiotensin I-converting enzyme (ACE) inhibitor which is an oligopeptide that may be helpful in lowering blood pressure and reducing the risk of stroke in persons having hypertension. Also rich in polysaccharides, phenolic compounds, and flavonoids. Therefore, inhibits inflammatory cytokines and oxidative stress and protects from lung failure. These compounds also help in reducing oxidative stress-mediated disease through radical scavenging activity hence these mushrooms are antioxidants also.

== Culinary use ==
Shimeji should always be cooked: it is not a good mushroom to serve raw due to a somewhat bitter taste, but the bitterness disappears completely upon cooking. The cooked mushroom has a pleasant, firm, slightly crunchy texture and a slightly nutty flavor. Cooking also makes this mushroom easier to digest. It works well in stir-fried foods like stir-fried vegetables, as well as with wild game or seafood. Also, it can be used in soups, stews, and in sauces. When cooked alone, Shimeji mushrooms can be sautéed whole, including the stem or stalk (only the very end cut off), using a higher temperature or they can be slow roasted at a low temperature with a small amount of butter or cooking oil. Shimeji is used in soups, nabe and takikomi gohan.

== See also ==
- List of Japanese ingredients
