= C19H14O6 =

The molecular formula C_{19}H_{14}O_{6} (molar mass: 338.31 g/mol, exact mass: 338.0790 u) may refer to:

- Landomycinone
- Ustalic acid
