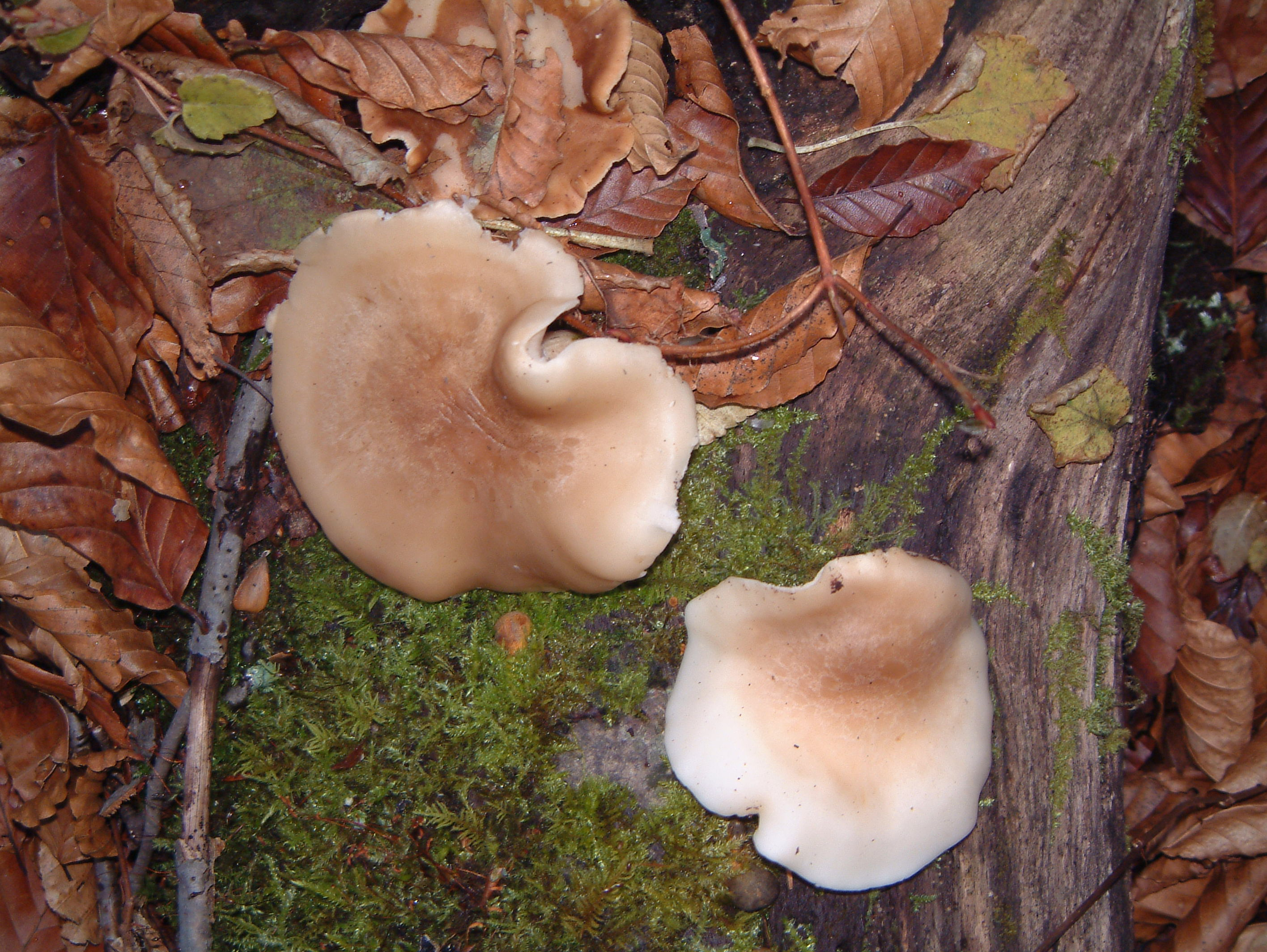
- Wild sample identified as "marmoreus", Mount Hotaka (Gunma).

Scientific classification
- Kingdom: Fungi
- Division: Basidiomycota
- Class: Agaricomycetes
- Order: Agaricales
- Family: Lyophyllaceae
- Genus: Hypsizygus
- Species: H. tessulatus

Binomial name
- Hypsizygus tessulatus (Bull.) Singer (1947)

Synonyms
- Hypsizygus tessellatus common misspelling; Hypsizygus marmoreus Peck (Note: Most commonly attributed to the commercially-cultured strains.); Hypsizygus elongatipes (Peck) H.E.Bigelow; Pleurotus elongatipes (Peck) H.E.Bigelow

= Hypsizygus tessulatus =

Species of mushroom-forming fungus

Hypsizygus tessulatus
- Mycological characteristics
- Gills on hymenium
- Cap is convex
- Stipe is bare
- Spore print is white to buff
- Ecology is saprotrophic
- Edibility is choice

Hypsizygus tessulatus, the beech mushroom, is a species of gilled mushroom. It grows on hardwood in the wild and is also cultivated as an edible mushroom.

== Taxonomy ==
A radical alternative view based on ITS DNA barcoding is that all members of the genus are the same species.

== Description ==
The white to yellow cap is 5–15 centimetres (2–6 in) across, convex then flat and sunken. The gills are adnexed to sinuate, fairly close, whitish then cream. The stem is up to 11 cm (4 1/4 in) long and 3 cm (1 1/8 in) wide, larger at the base.

The flesh is firm and white, with a pungent scent and mild taste. The spore print is white to buff.

== Distribution and habitat ==
The species is native to East Asia and common in northern North America. It is found singly and scattered on hardwood, often far above the ground. It is often found on beech trees, hence the common name.

== Cultivation ==
The species is cultivated locally in temperate climates in Europe, North America and Australia and sold fresh in supermarkets.

Two commercial variations are known from Japan:

- Buna-shimeji (ja:ブナシメジ), wild type brown coloration. Known as brown beech mushroom, beech mushroom, brown clamshell mushroom;
- Bunapi-shimeji (ja:ブナピー) is a white UV-induced mutant of the former, known as white beech mushroom, white clamshell mushroom. The original strain is registered by Hokto Corporation.

== Uses ==
The mushrooms is edible but tough when raw, so should be cooked, which also eliminates its bitter taste. The cooked mushroom has a firm, slightly crunchy texture and a nutty flavor. Preparation makes the mushroom easier to digest. It is often eaten with stir-fried foods including wild game and seafood. It is used in soups, stews and sauces. When prepared alone, Shimeji mushrooms can be sautéed as a whole, including the stem or stalk (only the very end cut off), using a higher temperature; or, they can be slow roasted on a low temperature with a small amount of butter or cooking oil. Shimeji is used in soups, nabe and takikomi gohan.

== Gallery ==
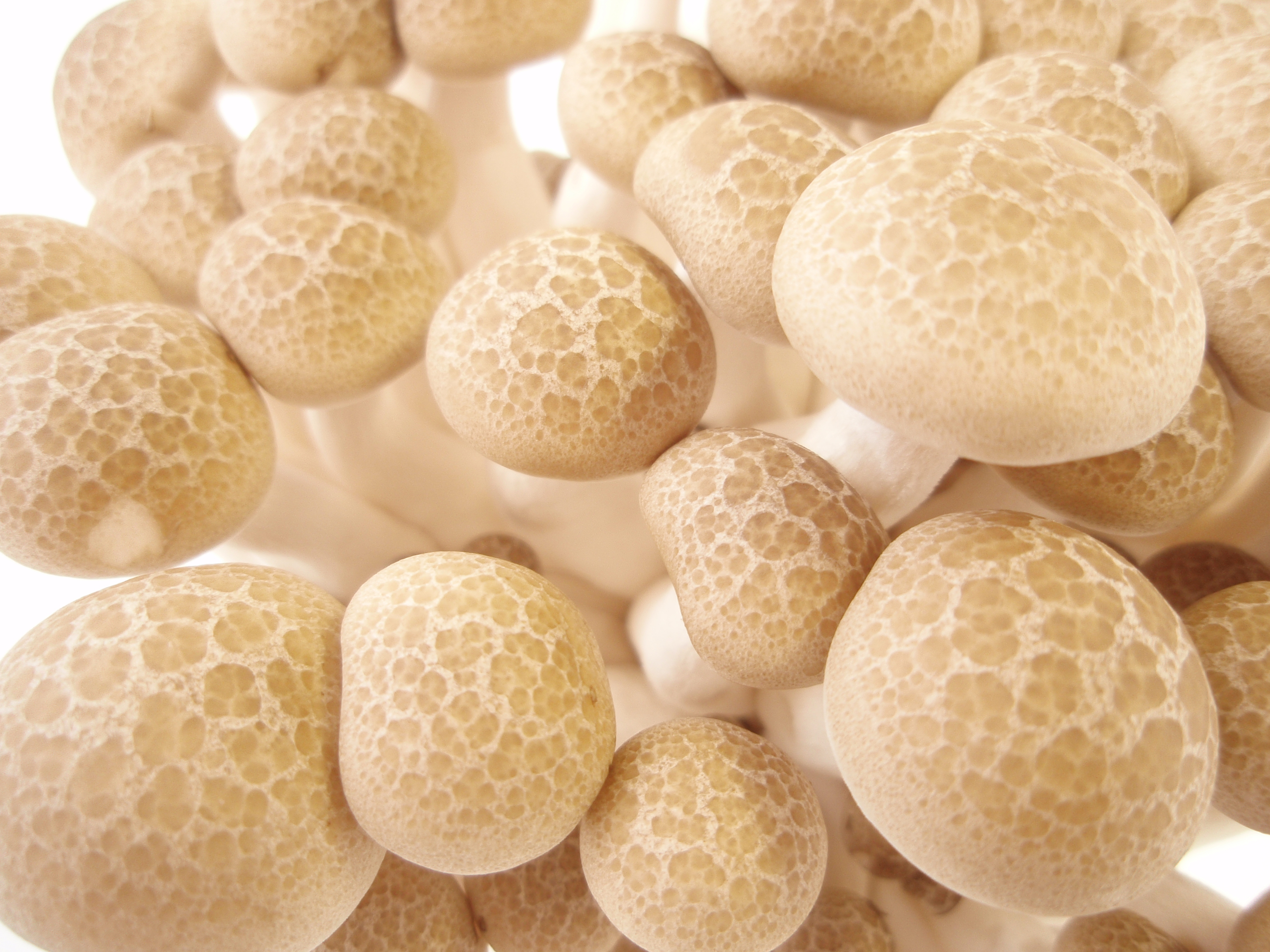
White, cultured

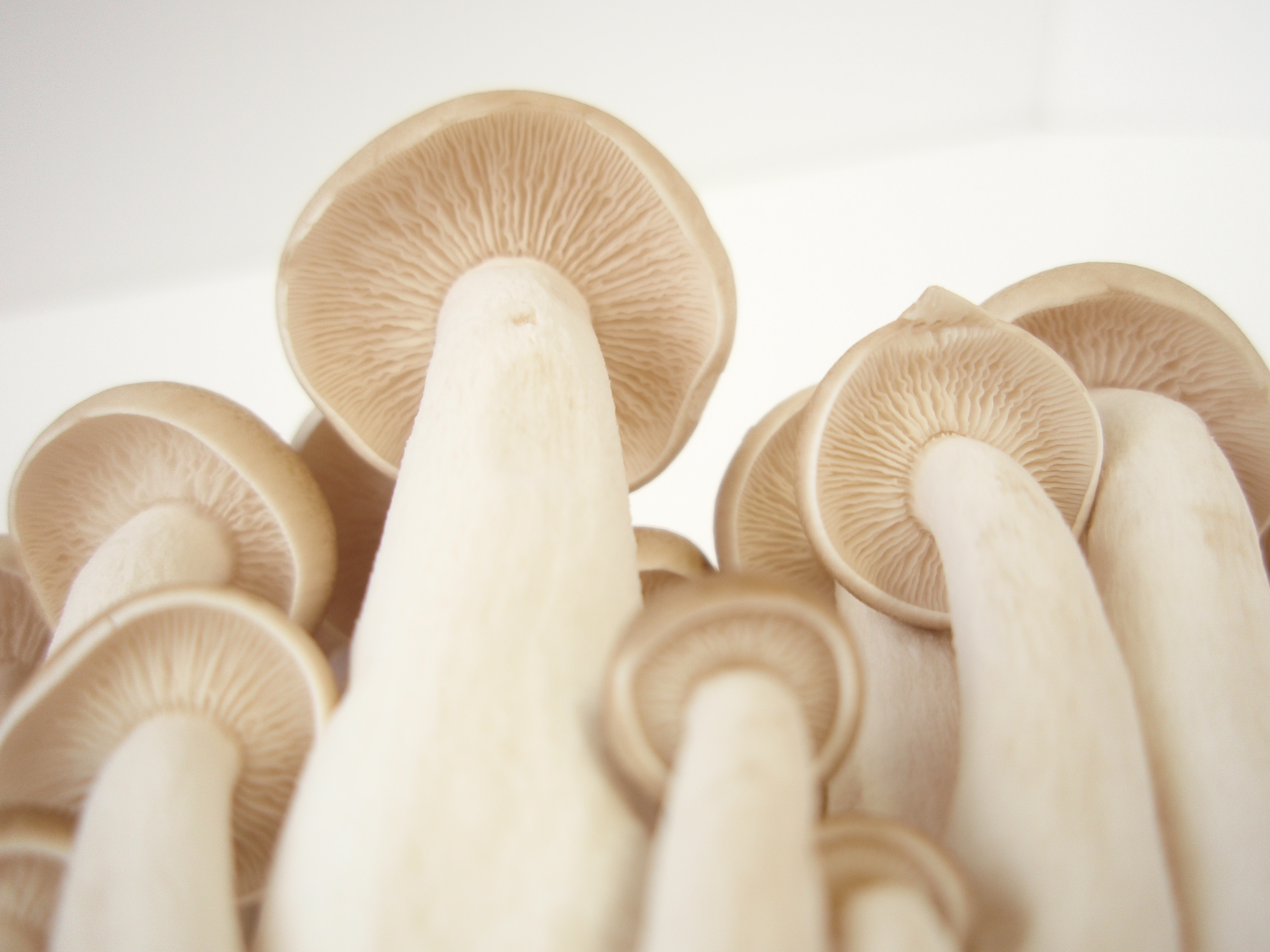
White, cultured

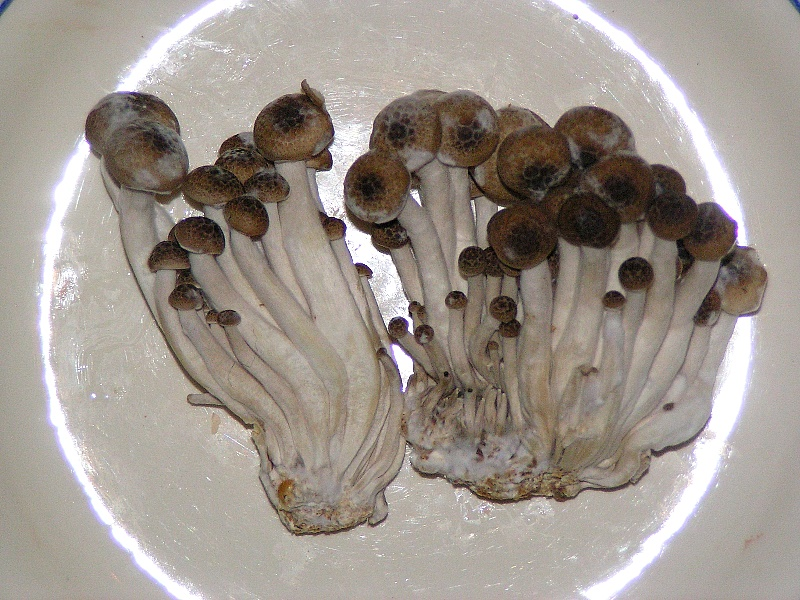
Brown, cultured

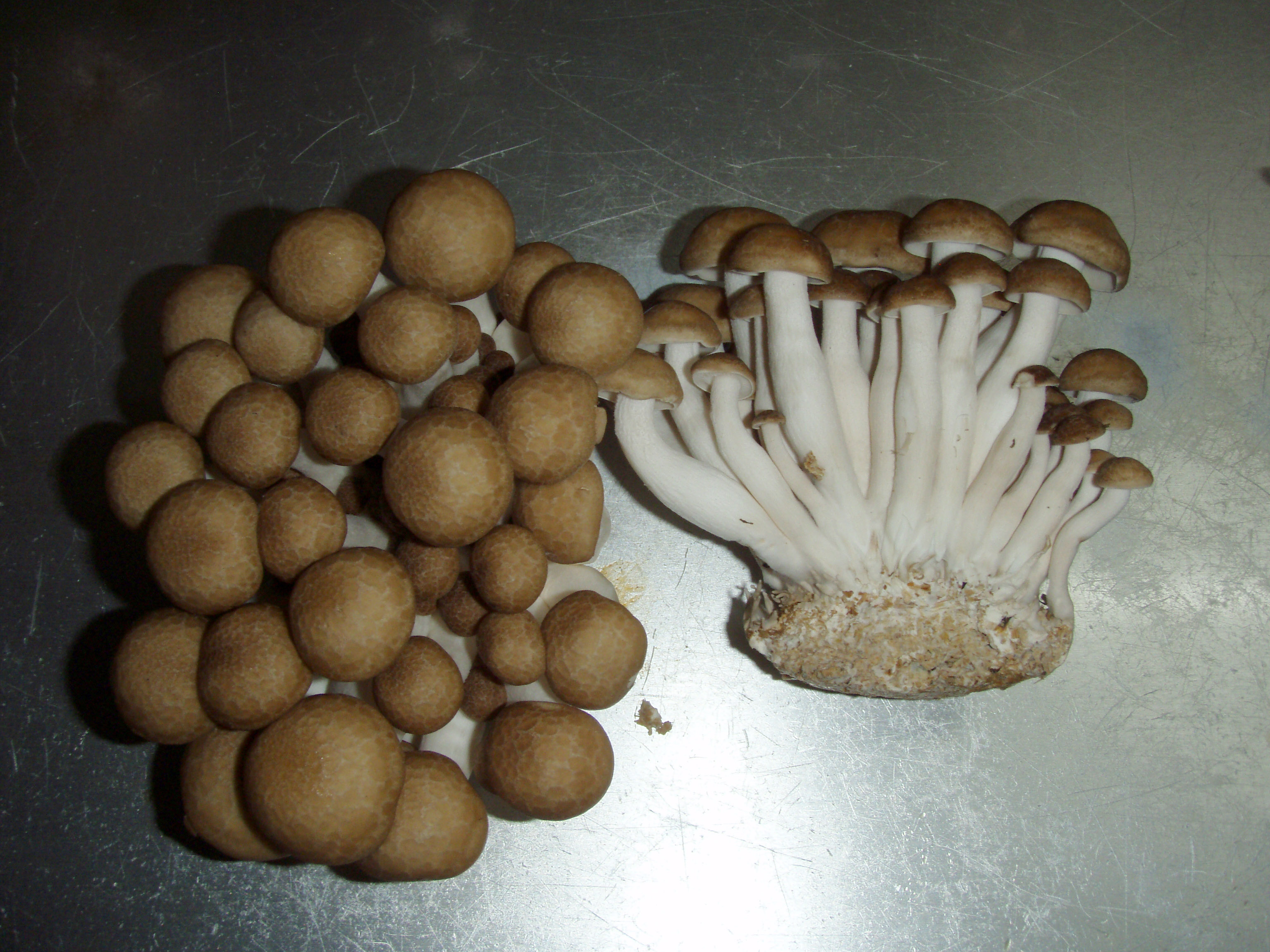
Brown, cultured

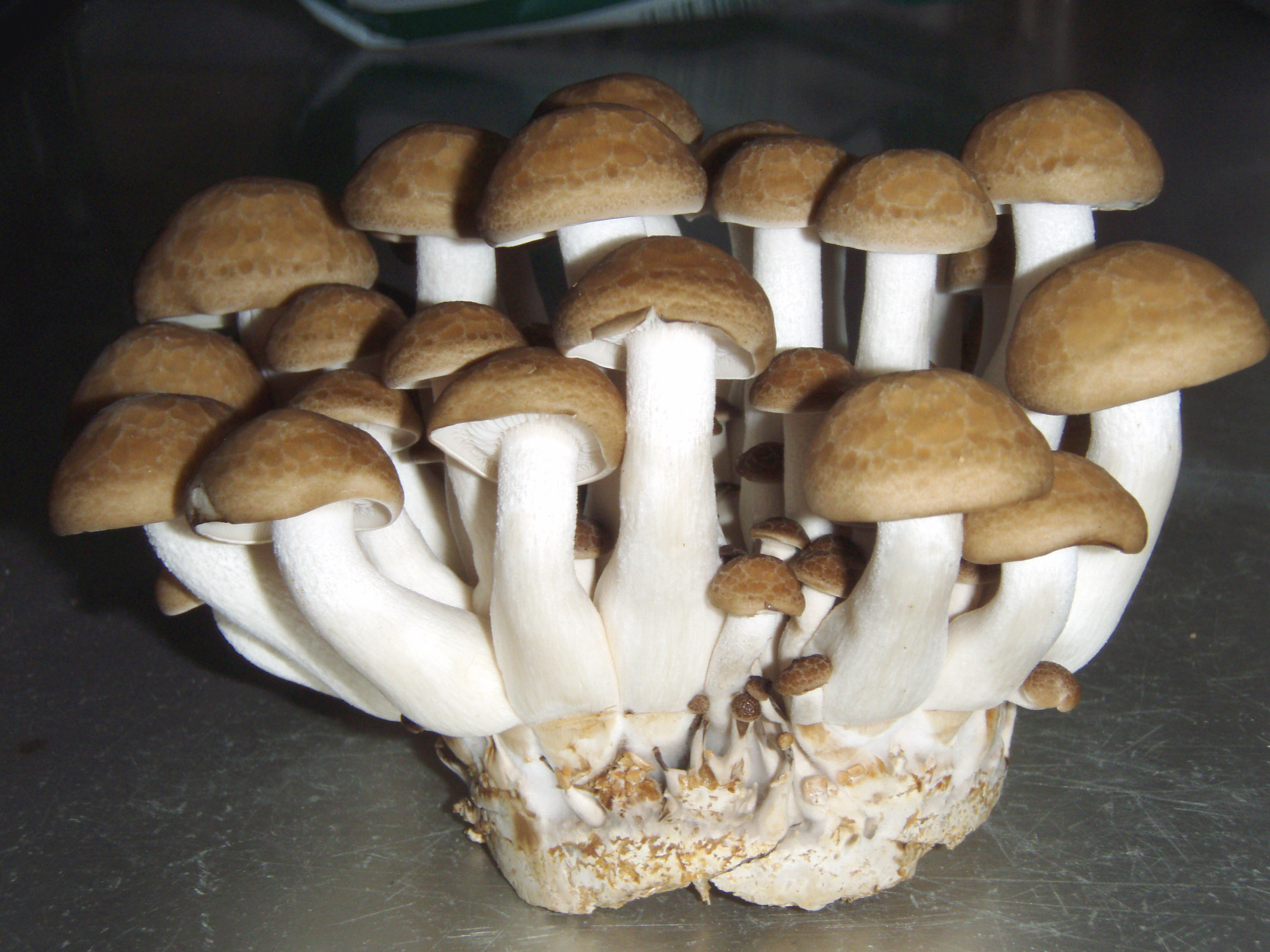
Brown, cultured

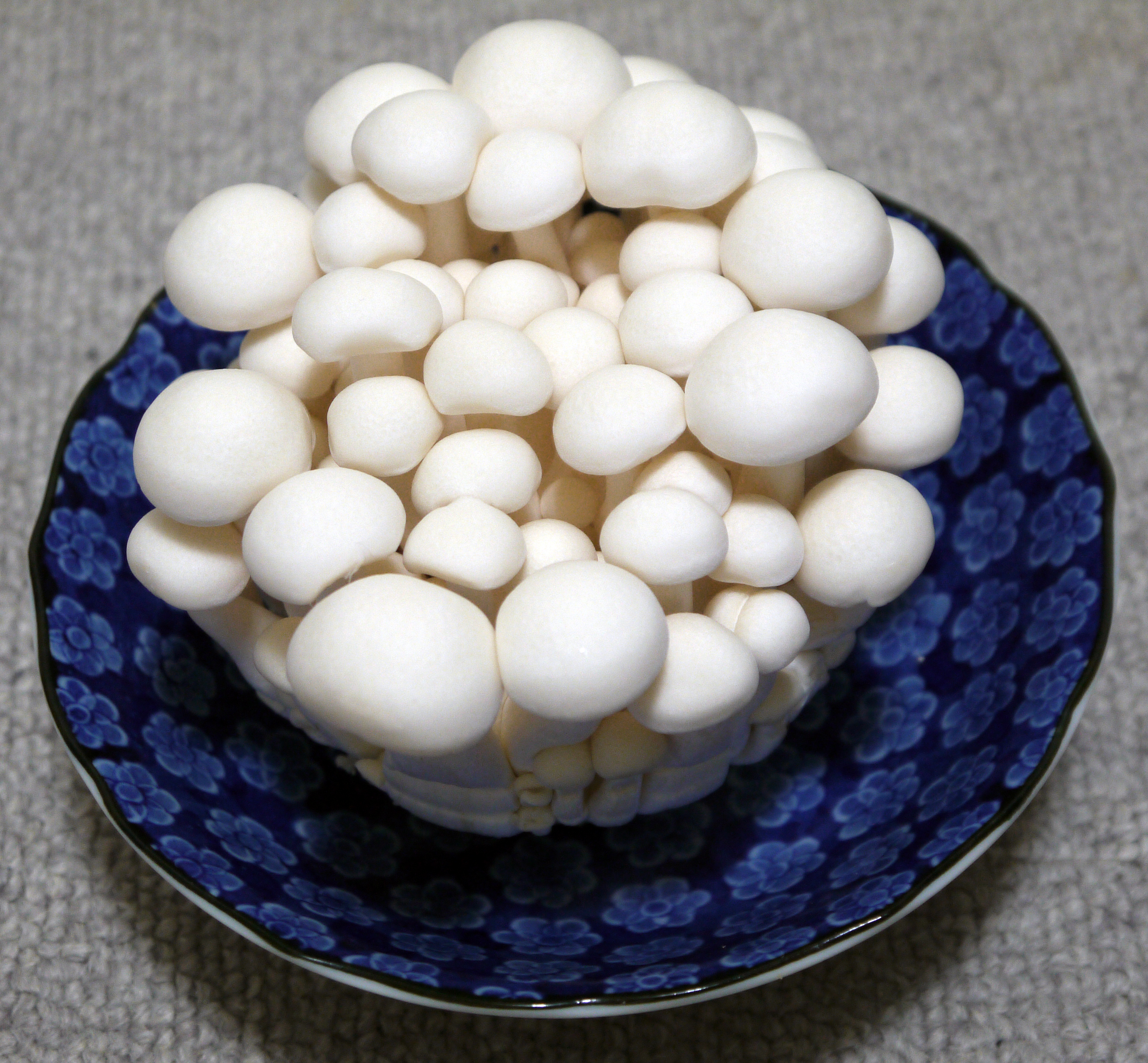
White, cultured, Bunapi (Hokto Ltd. develops)

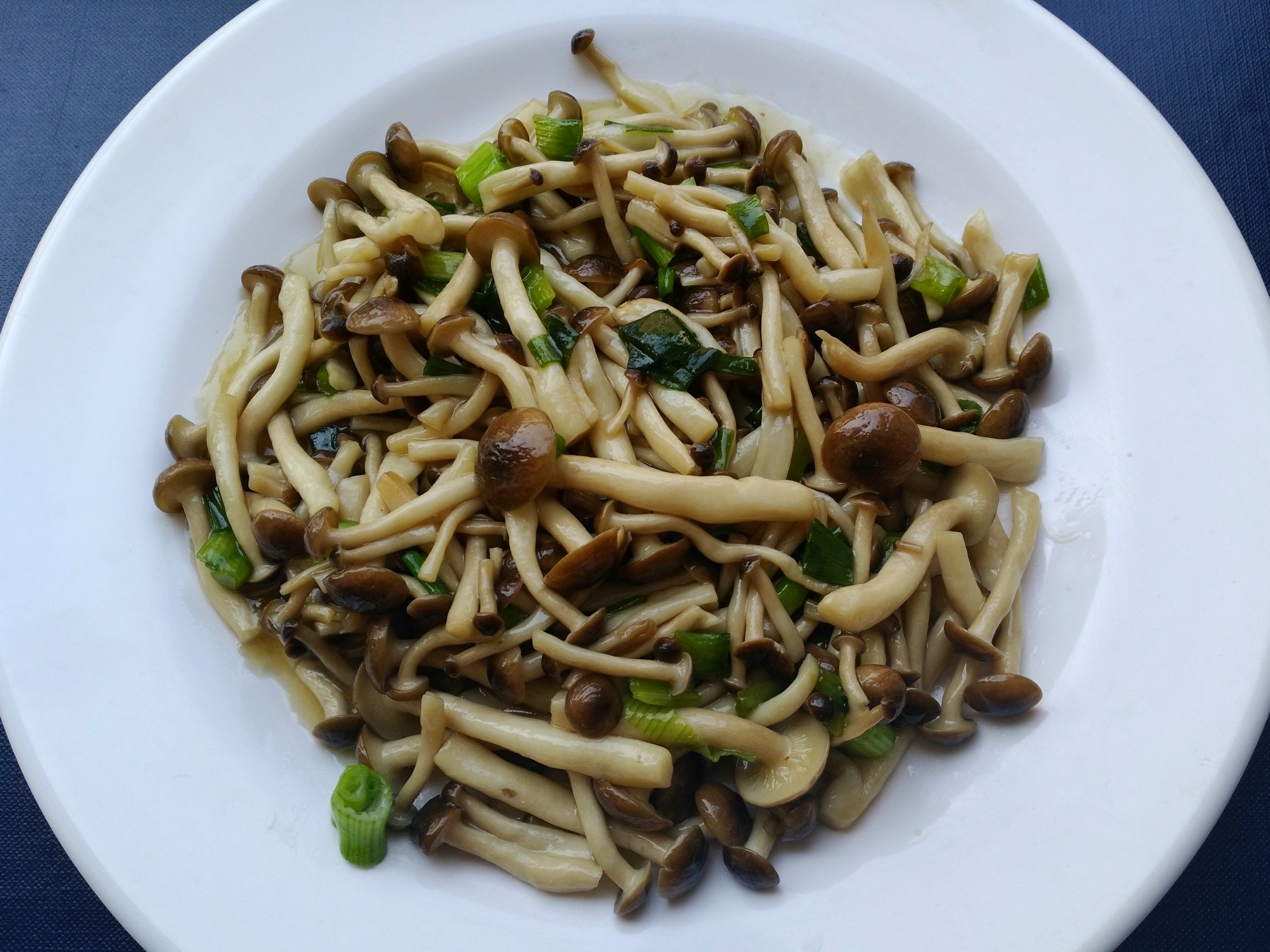
In Korean bokkeum (stir-fry)

== See also ==
- Hypsizygus ulmarius
- List of Japanese ingredients
- Medicinal mushrooms
