= Ustalic acid =

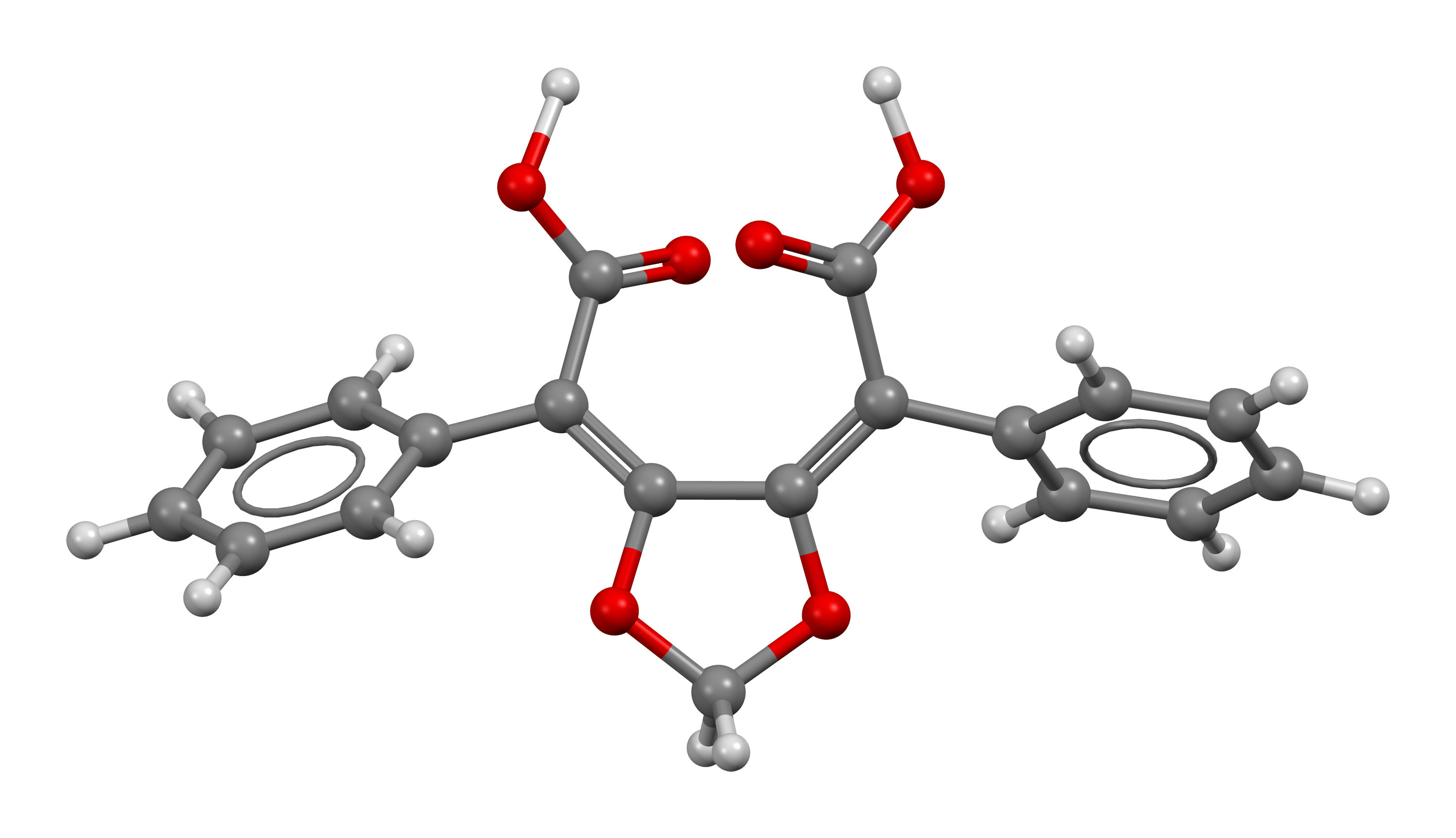

Names
- Preferred IUPAC name (2E,2′E)-2,2′-(1,3-Dioxolane-4,5-diylidene)bis(phenylacetic acid)

Identifiers
CAS Number	470699-70-8
3D model (JSmol)	Interactive image
ChemSpider	10298265
PubChem CID	21680754
UNII	9W2W239UEP
- InChI: InChI=1S/C19H14O6/c20-18(21)14(12-7-3-1-4-8-12)16-17(25-11-24-16)15(19(22)23)13-9-5-2-6-10-13/h1-10H,11H2,(H,20,21)(H,22,23)/b16-14+,17-15+ Key: KEGGPAWMZOAQMC-YXLFCKQPSA-N; InChI=1/C19H14O6/c20-18(21)14(12-7-3-1-4-8-12)16-17(25-11-24-16)15(19(22)23)13-9-5-2-6-10-13/h1-10H,11H2,(H,20,21)(H,22,23)/b16-14+,17-15+ Key: KEGGPAWMZOAQMC-YXLFCKQPBQ
- SMILES: O=C(O)C(=C2OCOC2=C(c1ccccc1)C(O)=O)c3ccccc3

Properties
Chemical formula	C_{19}H_{14}O_{6}
Molar mass	338.315 g·mol^{−1}
Appearance	White solid
- Except where otherwise noted, data are given for materials in their standard state (at 25 °C [77 °F], 100 kPa). Infobox references

Ustalic acid is a naturally occurring chemical compound found in the poisonous mushroom Tricholoma ustale.

== Occurrence ==
The compound was first reported by Japanese researcher Hirokazu Kawagishi and colleagues in 2002, who isolated about 190 milligrams of the chemical from 30.3 kg (67 lb) of fresh mushrooms.

== Toxicity ==
Ustalic acid is an inhibitor of the sodium-potassium pump (Na^{+}/K^{+}-ATPase), found in the plasma membrane of all animal cells. Physiologically, inhibition of the sodium-potassium pump generally causes diarrhea, as it prevents water reabsorption from the intestines. When force-fed to laboratory mice, ustalic acid causes them to sit still in a crouched position, hesitant to move, and induces tremors and abdominal contractions. Doses of 10 milligrams cause death. Biosynthetically, ustalic acid is thought to originate from oxidative cleavage of the red pigment phlebiarubron.

== Synthesis ==
A low-yield total synthesis of the dimethyl ester of ustalic acid was reported in 2006, starting from phlebiarubrone. The oxidant used was lead tetraacetate.

Hayakawa and colleagues reported a more efficient synthesis in 2008, using sesamol as a starting point. This procedure requires eight steps, and uses Suzuki–Miyaura coupling and oxidation of a methylene acetal.

== See also ==
- C_{19}H_{14}O_{6}
