= Aquayamycin =

Names
- Preferred IUPAC name (3R,4aR,12bS)-9-[(2R,4R,5S,6R)-4,5-Dihydroxy-6-methyloxan-2-yl]-3,4a,8,12b-tetrahydroxy-3-methyl-3,4,4a,12b-tetrahydrotetraphene-1,7,12(2H)-trione

Identifiers
CAS Number	26055-63-0
3D model (JSmol)	Interactive image
ChemSpider	66147
MeSH	aquayamycin
PubChem CID	73441
CompTox Dashboard (EPA)	DTXSID40948932
- InChI: InChI=1S/C25H26O10/c1-10-19(28)14(26)7-15(35-10)11-3-4-12-17(20(11)29)21(30)13-5-6-24(33)9-23(2,32)8-16(27)25(24,34)18(13)22(12)31/h3-6,10,14-15,19,26,28-29,32-34H,7-9H2,1-2H3/t10-,14-,15-,19-,23+,24+,25+/m1/s1 Key: KCOULPRVOZDQEL-IFNZWHIZSA-N; InChI=1/C25H26O10/c1-10-19(28)14(26)7-15(35-10)11-3-4-12-17(20(11)29)21(30)13-5-6-24(33)9-23(2,32)8-16(27)25(24,34)18(13)22(12)31/h3-6,10,14-15,19,26,28-29,32-34H,7-9H2,1-2H3/t10-,14-,15-,19-,23+,24+,25+/m1/s1 Key: KCOULPRVOZDQEL-IFNZWHIZBY
- SMILES: C[C@@H]1[C@H]([C@@H](C[C@@H](O1)C2=C(C3=C(C=C2)C(=O)C4=C(C3=O)C=C[C@]5([C@@]4(C(=O)C[C@](C5)(C)O)O)O)O)O)O

Properties
Chemical formula	C_{25}H_{26}O_{10}
Molar mass	486.47 g/mol
- Except where otherwise noted, data are given for materials in their standard state (at 25 °C [77 °F], 100 kPa). verify (what is ?) Infobox references

Aquayamycin is an anthraquinone derivative. It is an inhibitor of the enzyme tyrosine hydroxylase.

Saquayamycins (saquayamycins A, B, C and D) are antibiotics of the aquayamycin group found in Streptomyces nodosus cultures broth.
