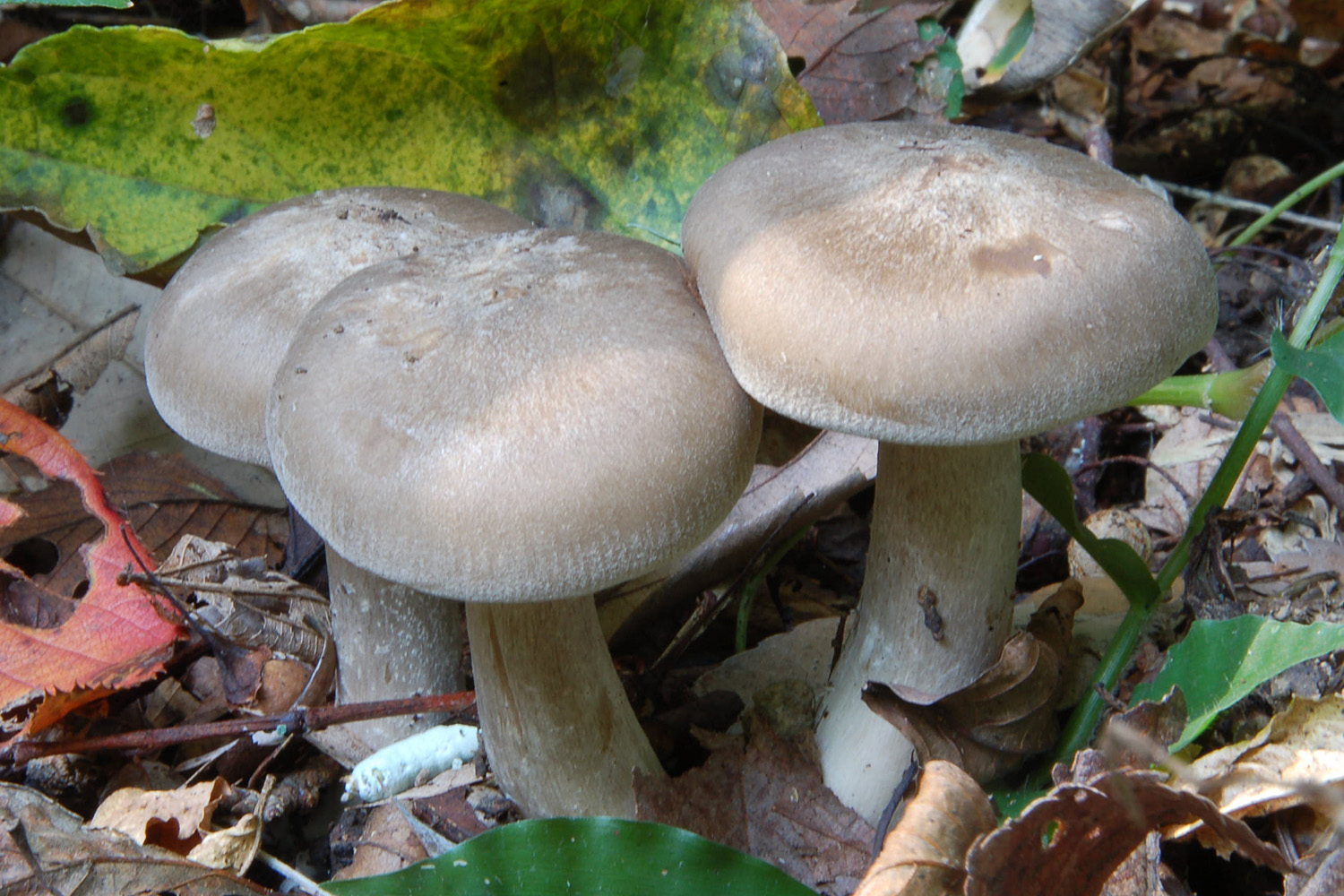

Conservation status
- Apparently Secure (NatureServe)

Scientific classification
- Kingdom: Fungi
- Division: Basidiomycota
- Class: Agaricomycetes
- Order: Agaricales
- Family: Lyophyllaceae
- Genus: Lyophyllum
- Species: L. decastes

Binomial name
- Lyophyllum decastes (Fr.) Singer

Synonyms
- Agaricus decastes Fr. (1818)

= Lyophyllum decastes =

Species of fungus

Lyophyllum decastes
- Mycological characteristics
- Gills on hymenium
- Cap is convex
- Hymenium is adnate or decurrent
- Stipe is bare
- Spore print is white
- Edibility is edible or choice

Lyophyllum decastes is a species of fungus in the family Lyophyllaceae. It is known as the clustered domecap in the United Kingdom and the fried chicken mushroom in North America. The basidiocarps (fruit bodies) are agaricoid (gilled mushrooms). It forms large clusters on the ground. Considered edible, it is cultivated in Asia.

== Description ==
The caps are smooth, varied in color, and range from 4–12 cm (1 1/2–4 3/4 in) wide. The whitish-grayish stalks are 5–10 cm (2–4 in) long and 1–3 cm (3/8–1 1/8 in) wide. The gills are white but may yellow slightly with age. The firm flesh remains white on exposure. The spores are white.

=== Similar species ===
Lyophyllum semitale and Pluteus petasatus are similar in appearance, as is L. fumosum; it and L. loricatum are sometimes grouped with L. decastes as a species complex, lacking distinct differentiating features. L. shimeji is also similar but has a darker colored cap.

== Distribution and habitat ==
The species was originally described from Sweden and is widespread throughout Europe and north temperate regions. It is prolific in summer and fall until spring on the West Coast of the United States and is widely distributed in North America. It also occurs in eastern temperate Asia.

Growing in dense, often huge clusters on the ground, the mushrooms are usually found where the ground has been disturbed such as roadbeds, gravel, paths, landscaping areas, and sometimes in woods. It is variously considered saprotrophic or ectomycorrhizal.

== Uses ==
In North America, the species is considered edible and occasionally collected in the wild, but there are some reports of gastric upset and possible confusion with poisonous Entoloma species or Clitocybe dilatata.

The species is commercially cultivated in Japan, where it is known as hatake shimeji, and in China, where it is known as luronggu. The fungus is considered to be both a food and a health supplement and is grown on sawdust or bark compost.
