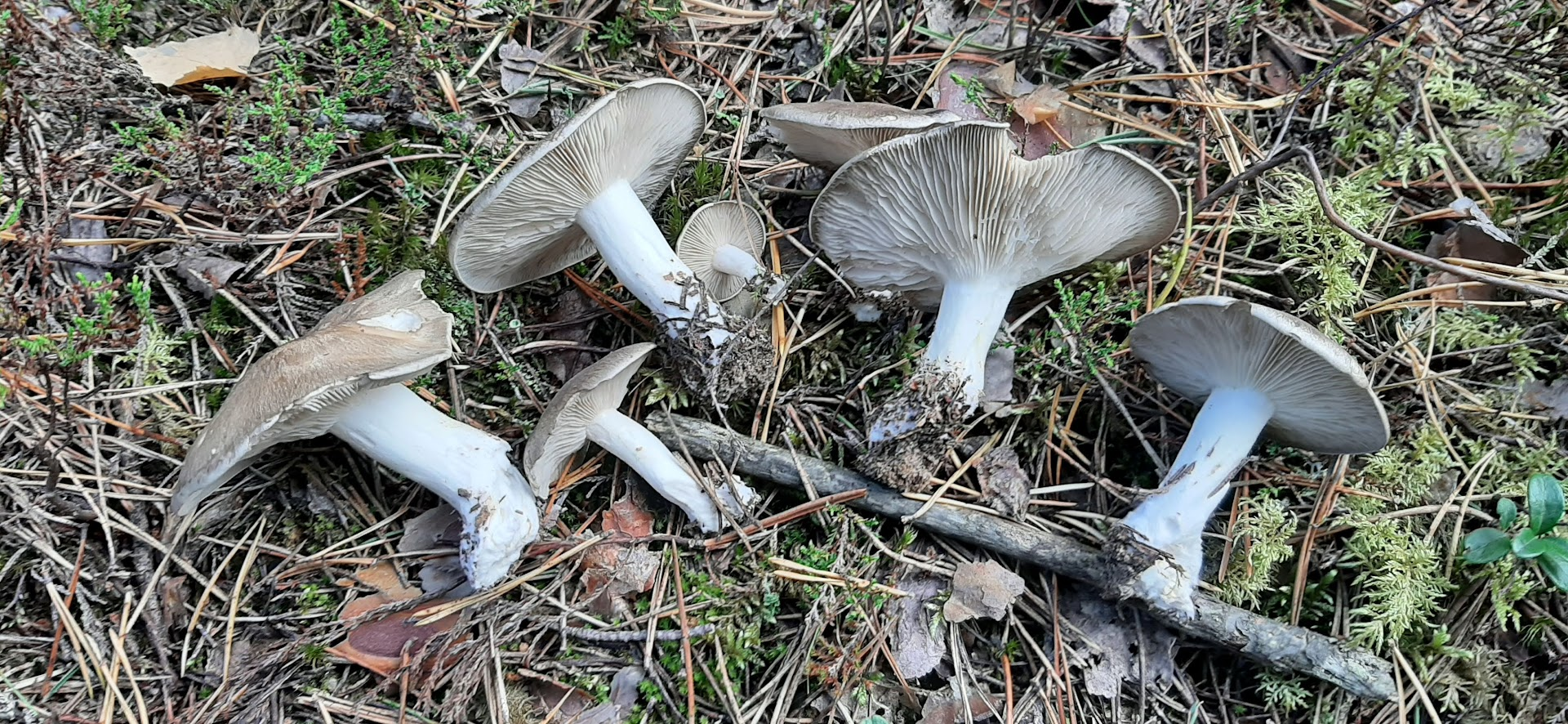

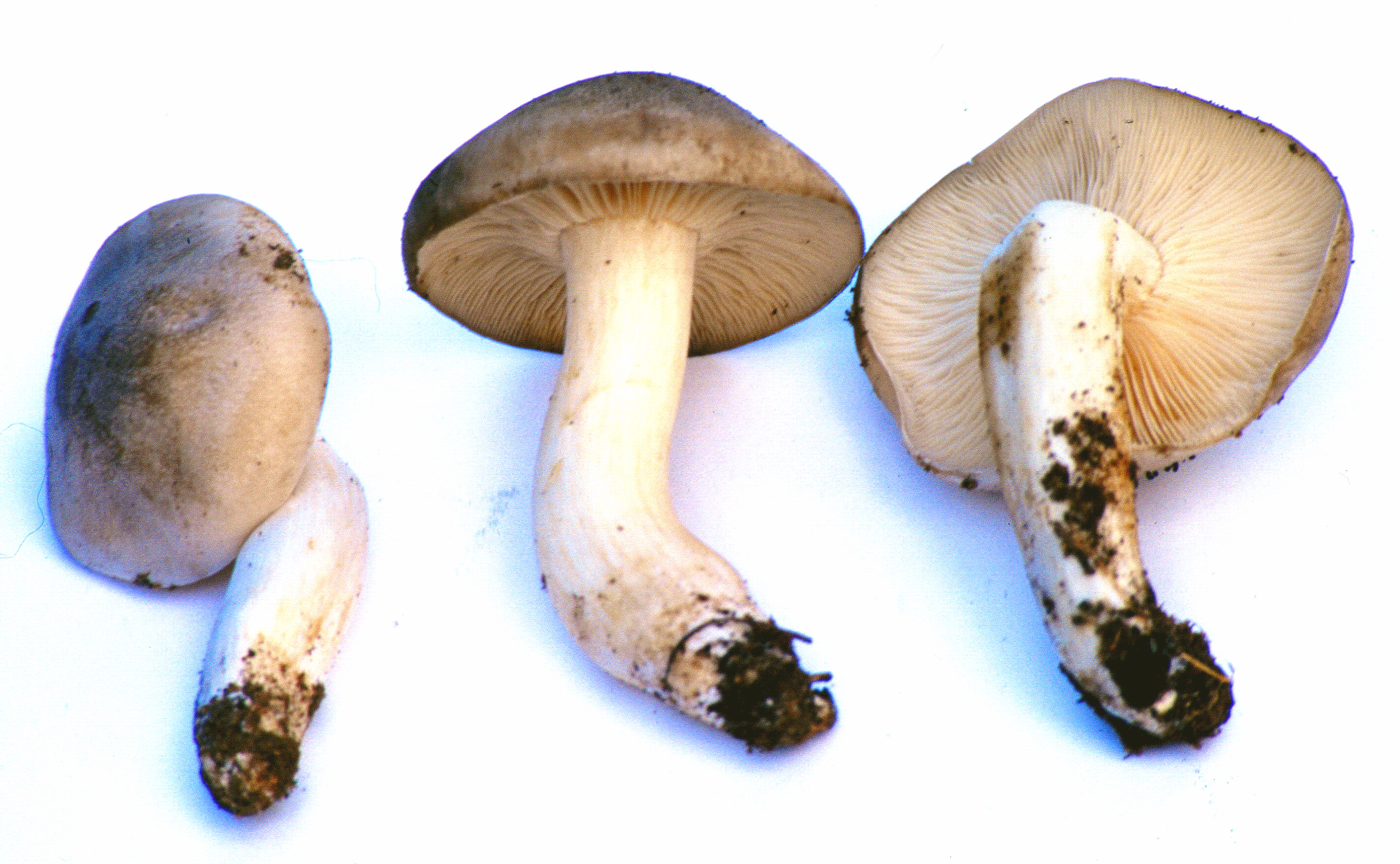

Scientific classification
- Kingdom: Fungi
- Division: Basidiomycota
- Class: Agaricomycetes
- Order: Agaricales
- Family: Lyophyllaceae
- Genus: Lyophyllum
- Species: L. shimeji

Binomial name
- Lyophyllum shimeji (Kawam.) Hongo 1971

= Lyophyllum shimeji =

Species of fungus

Lyophyllum shimeji
- Mycological characteristics
- Gills on hymenium
- Cap is convex
- Hymenium is adnate or decurrent
- Stipe is bare
- Spore print is white to buff
- Ecology is mycorrhizal
- Edibility is edible

Lyophyllum shimeji, commonly known as the hon-shimeji is an edible species of fungus in the family Lyophyllaceae that grows in pine forests, often near man-made roads. It was originally only known from Japan, Korea and China, but presently has a known distribution that includes Russia, Estonia, Scandinavia, Czechia and Spain, as well as USA and Canada. It is particularly widespread in lichen pine forests in Sweden, Finland and Norway, after being confirmed from these countries as late as 2011.

== Ecology ==
Lyophyllum shimeji grows in pine forests.

== Edibility ==
This species is considered edible. Several groups, such as Takara Bio and Yamasa, have patented methods to cultivate hon-shimeji, and the cultivated mushroom is available from several manufacturers in Japan.

== Similar species ==
Lyophyllum shimeji is similar in appearance to the edible species Lyophyllum decastes and toxic species Lyophyllum loricatum, Lyophyllum connatum, Clitocybe dilatata, and those of the Entoloma genus are also similar in appearance.

== Gallery ==
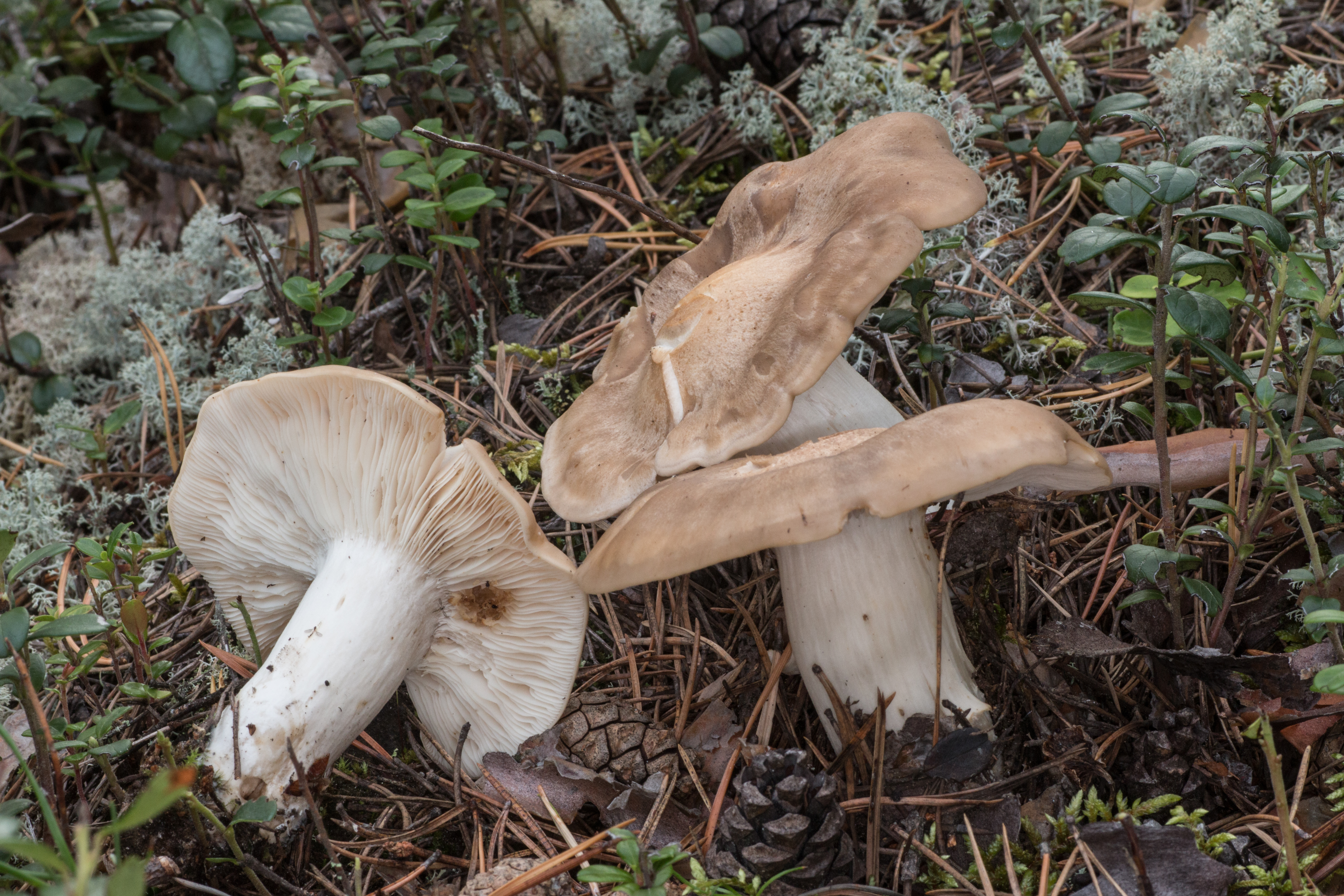

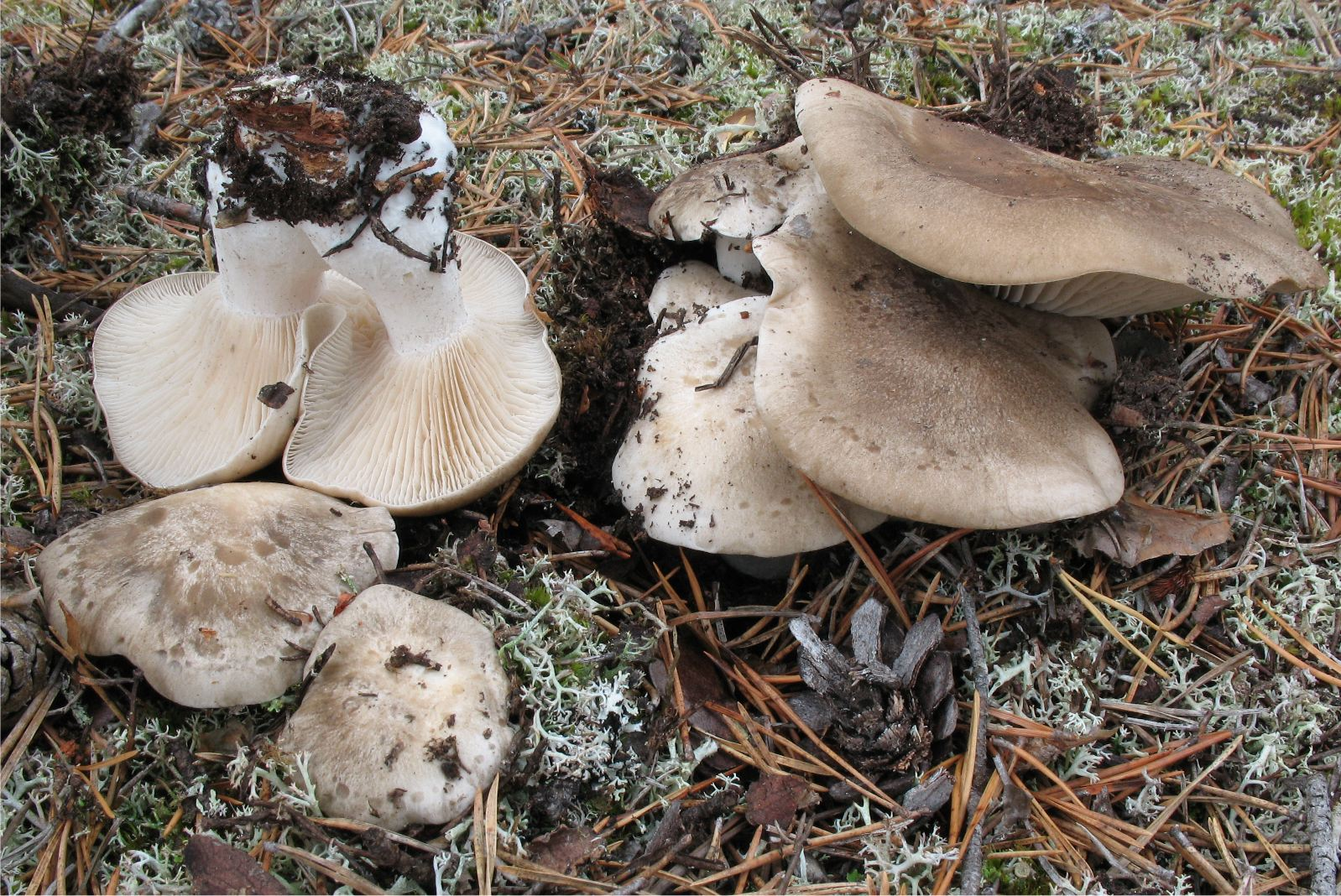

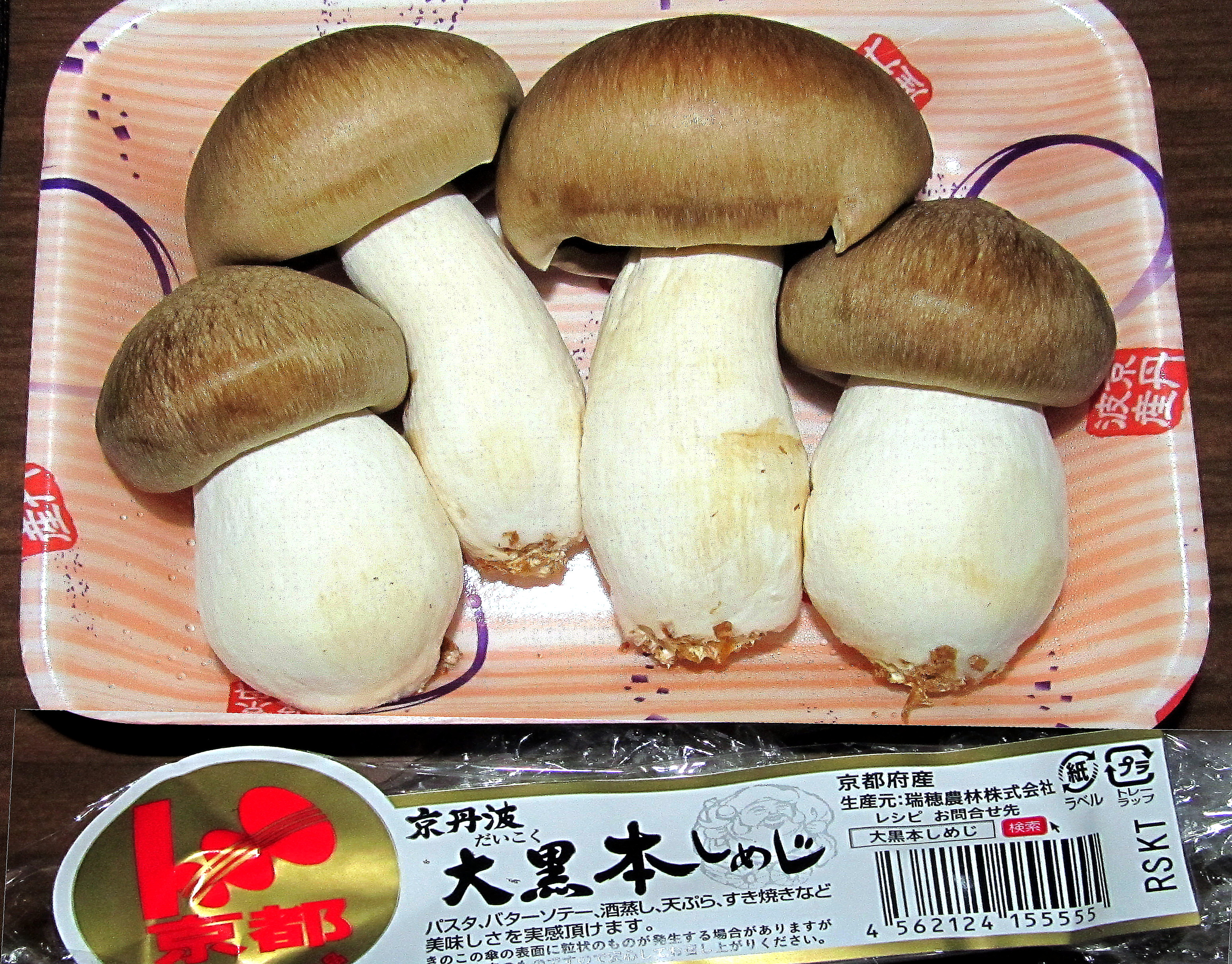

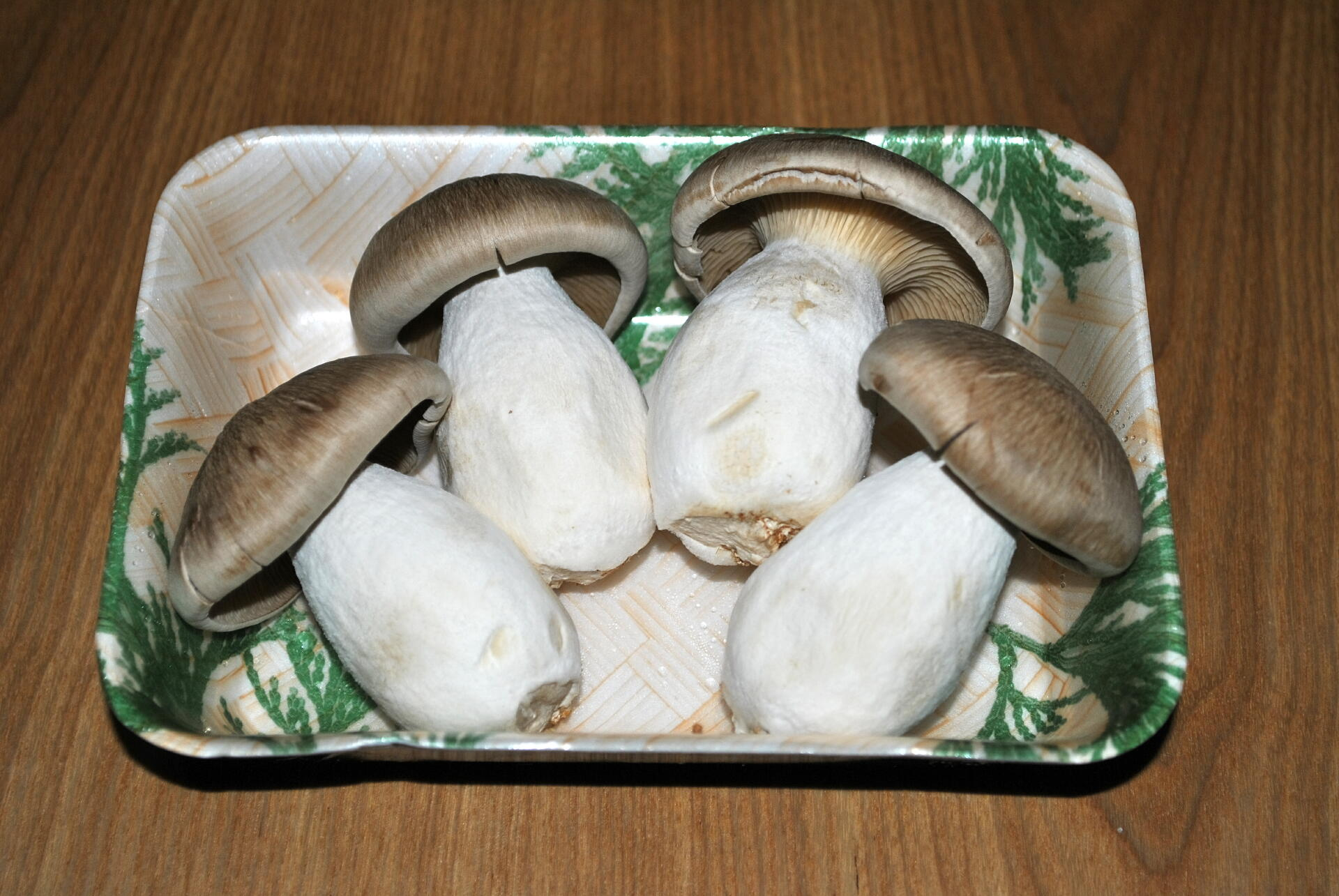
