= Saquayamycins =

Group of chemical compounds

Saquayamycin A

Saquayamycin B

Saquayamycins are "aquayamycin-type" antibiotics isolated from Streptomyces nodosus.
