= Landomycins =

Angucycline antibiotics

Landomycin A

Landomycin B

Landomycins are angucycline antibiotics isolated from Streptomyces.
