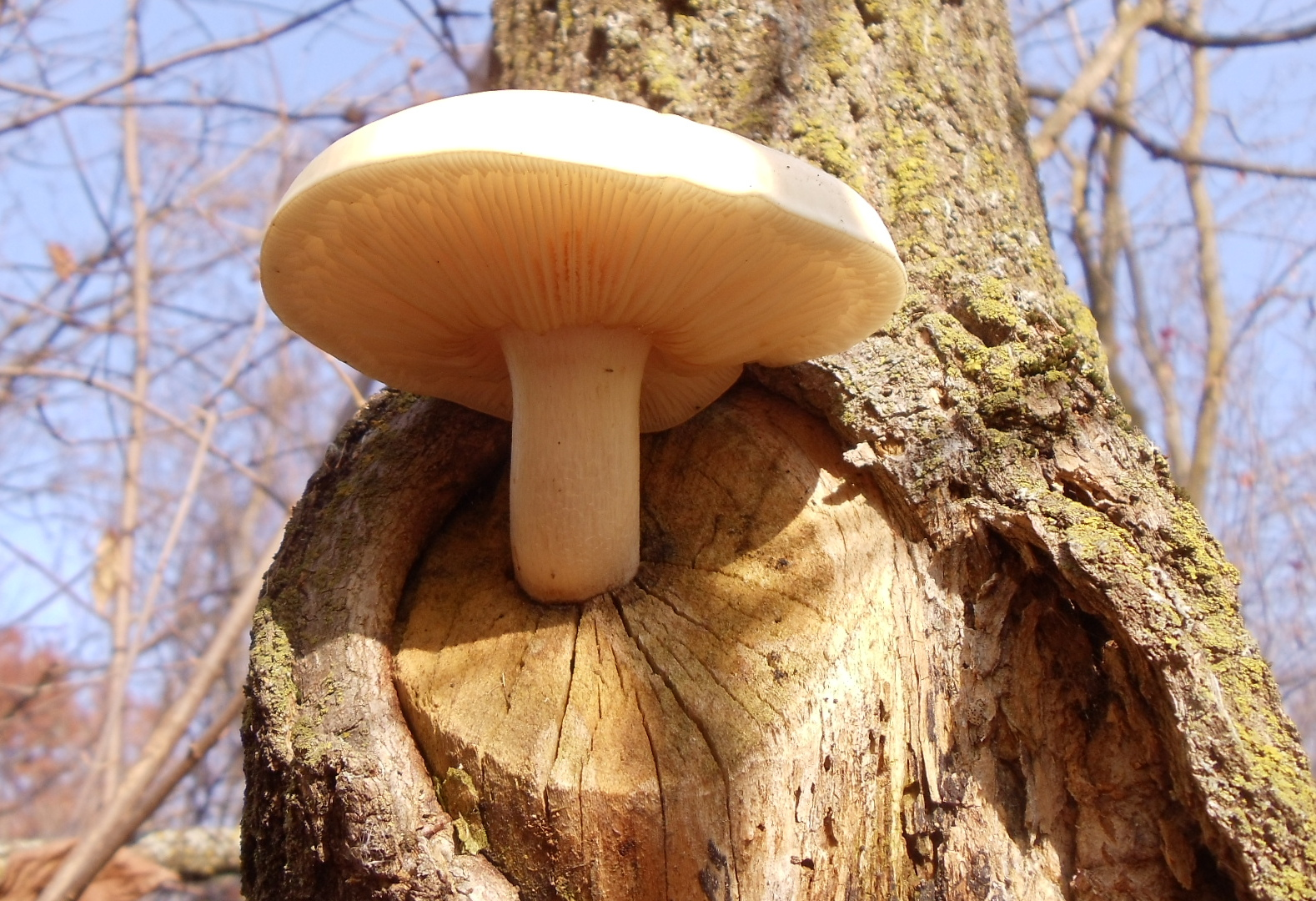
- Hypsizygus ulmarius mushroom

Scientific classification
- Kingdom: Fungi
- Division: Basidiomycota
- Class: Agaricomycetes
- Order: Agaricales
- Family: Lyophyllaceae
- Genus: Hypsizygus
- Species: H. ulmarius

Binomial name
- Hypsizygus ulmarius (Bull. ex Fr.) Redhead (1984)

Synonyms
- Agaricus ulmarius (Bull.ex.Fr.); Lyophyllum ulmarium (Bull.) Kuhner; Pleurotus ulmarius (Bull.) P. kumm.

= Hypsizygus ulmarius =

Species of mushroom-forming fungus

Hypsizygus ulmarius
- Mycological characteristics
- Gills on hymenium
- Cap is convex or depressed
- Hymenium is adnate or decurrent
- Stipe is bare
- Spore print is white to cream
- Ecology is saprotrophic or parasitic
- Edibility is edible

Hypsizygus ulmarius, commonly known as the elm oyster mushroom or less commonly as the elm leech, is a species of fungus. It has often been confused with oyster mushrooms in the Pleurotus genus but can be differentiated easily as the gills are either not decurrent or not deeply decurrent.

While not quite as common as true oyster mushrooms, they have a wide range globally in temperate forests. It is an edible species. The mushrooms and vegetative hyphae of this species have been studied in recent years for their potential benefits to human health, and mycoremediation.

== Taxonomy ==
The taxonomic name of Hypsizygus ulmarius means both 'high up' (Hypsi-) and 'yoke' (-zygus), referring to where the mushroom can be found attached to its host tree. The species name refers to elm (Ulmus spp.), a tree the fungus commonly grows on. This species was first described in 1791 as Agaricus ulmarius by Jean Baptiste Francois Pierre Bulliard, a French physician and botanist responsible for the first description of many species of fungi. At this time, most gilled mushrooms were placed in this genus. With the creation of the genus Pleurotus by Paul Kummer for oyster mushrooms, this species was then named Pleurotus ulmarius. This was most likely due to the similar appearance of the fruiting body of these species. When famed French mycologist Robert Kühner revised fungi in the family Agaricales into more genera, the elm oyster mushroom was coined Lyophyllum ulmarium. However, this species was most recently moved to its current genus as Hypsizygus ulmarius in 1984 by Canadian mycologist Scott Redhead. This move was based on ecological and morphological similarity to another species in Hypsizygus.

This final shift from Lyophyllum to Hypsizygus was supported by a later study comparing DNA for the large ribosomal subunit RNA coding region divergent domain (D2) of species in the genus Lyophyllum. Based on both culture morphologies and the phylogeny produced using the DNA, the authors agreed with Redhead's classification. Further DNA evidence suggests that the genus Hypsizygus is polyphyletic, however, meaning that these species lack a common ancestor in the current phylogeny. There is still much to learn about the phylogenetic relationship of the (currently three) species in the Hypsizygus genus.

== Description ==
The mushrooms of Hypsizygus ulmarius appear white to cream, and are relatively uniform in color throughout. The stipe extends perpendicular from the fungus's host tree and then bends vertically to form the cap. The stipe is bare of any rings or other features. Additionally, the stipe connects almost perfectly in the center of the cap. The cap itself is usually about 6–15 cm (2.4–5.9 in) in diameter, though it may be larger, and is convex with an incurved margin. Larger caps can appear to be depressed. They will be uniform and smooth, though they can become aerolate as they age. The gills are "adnate or only very slightly decurrent" in contrast with the gills of the commonly confused Pleurotus spp., which are deeply decurrent. The mushrooms of H. ulmarius are often found in clusters of 1 to 3, though there may be more on larger tree wounds.

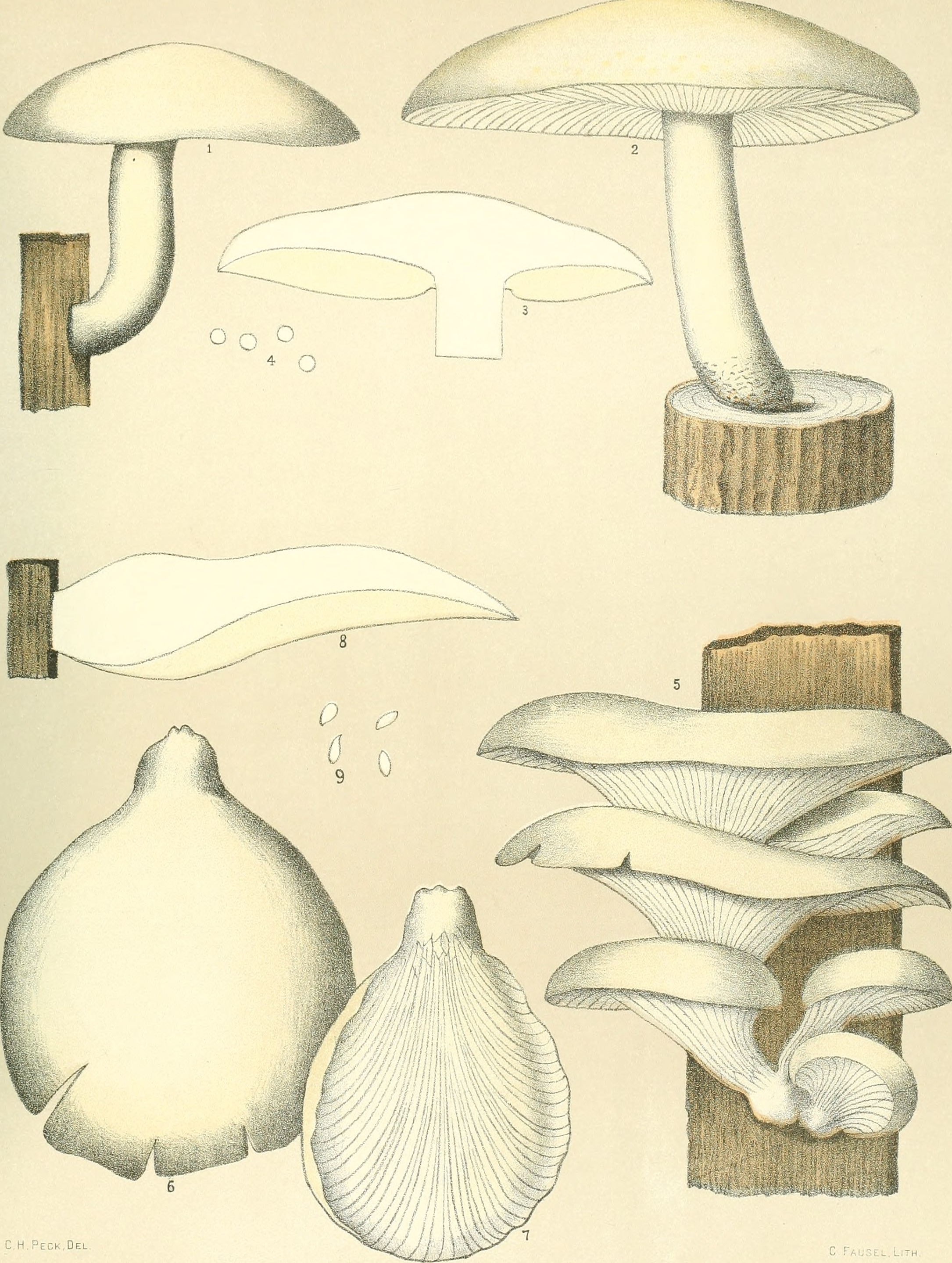
Artistic comparison between Hypsizygus ulmarius (top; 1-4) and Pleurotus ostreatus (bottom; 6-9).

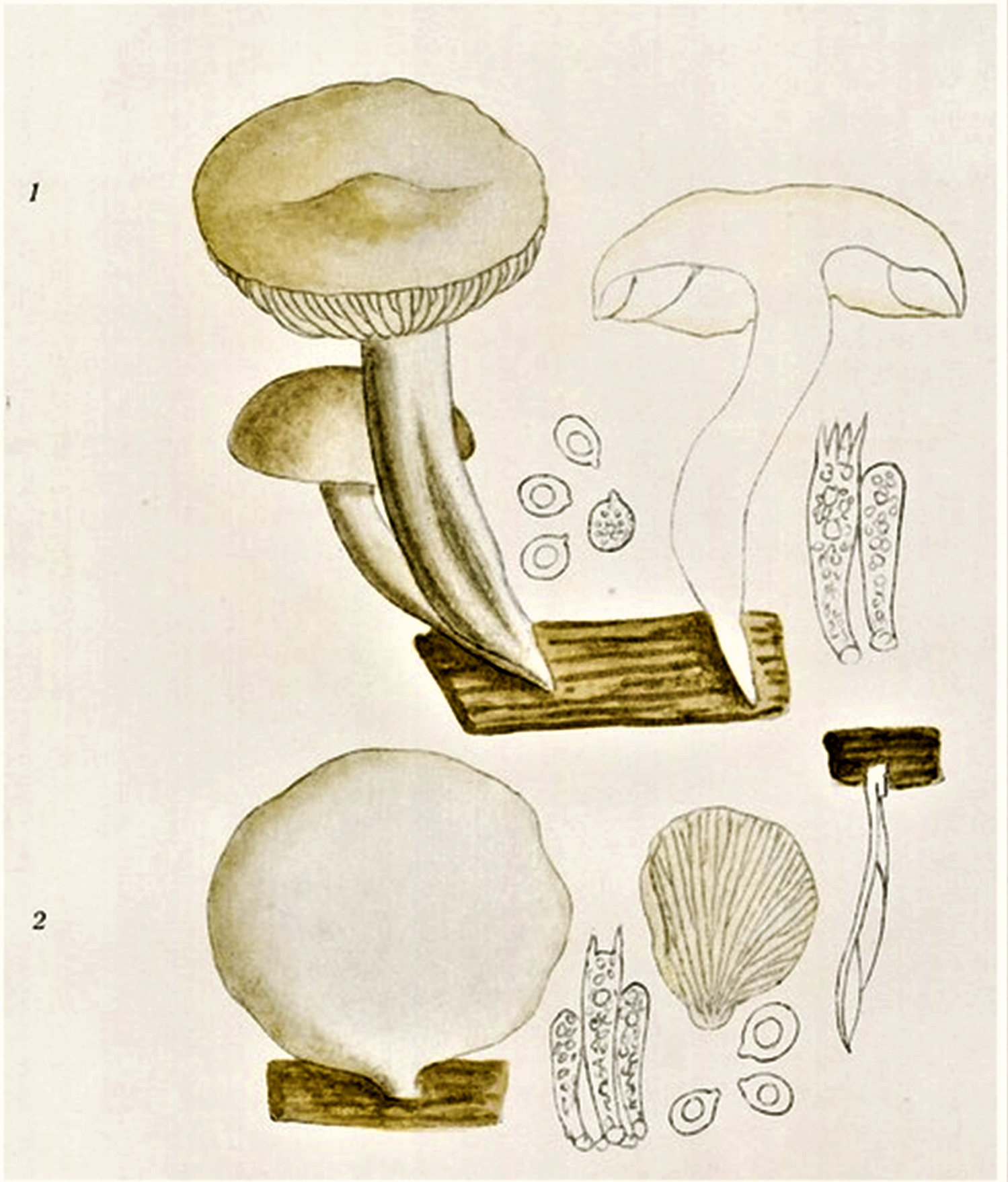
Artistic drawing of (1) Hypsizygus ulmarius and (2) Pleurocybella porrigens.

Cultures of this species are known to produce both sexual and asexual spores. The asexual arthrospores may be mono- or multinucleate. There is conflicting data on the size of the sexual basidiospores of H. ulmarius, but the original description of the species by Redhead reports that they are usually about 5–7 micrometers in diameter. Their shape is subglobose to ellipsoidal. The spore print of this species is white to pale cream.

=== Similar species ===
Hypsizygus ulmarius can be confused with H. tessulatus, which more commonly grows in clusters. Ossicaulis lignatilis is smaller and grows from wood cavities. The gills of Pleurotus levis are decurrent.

== Ecology ==
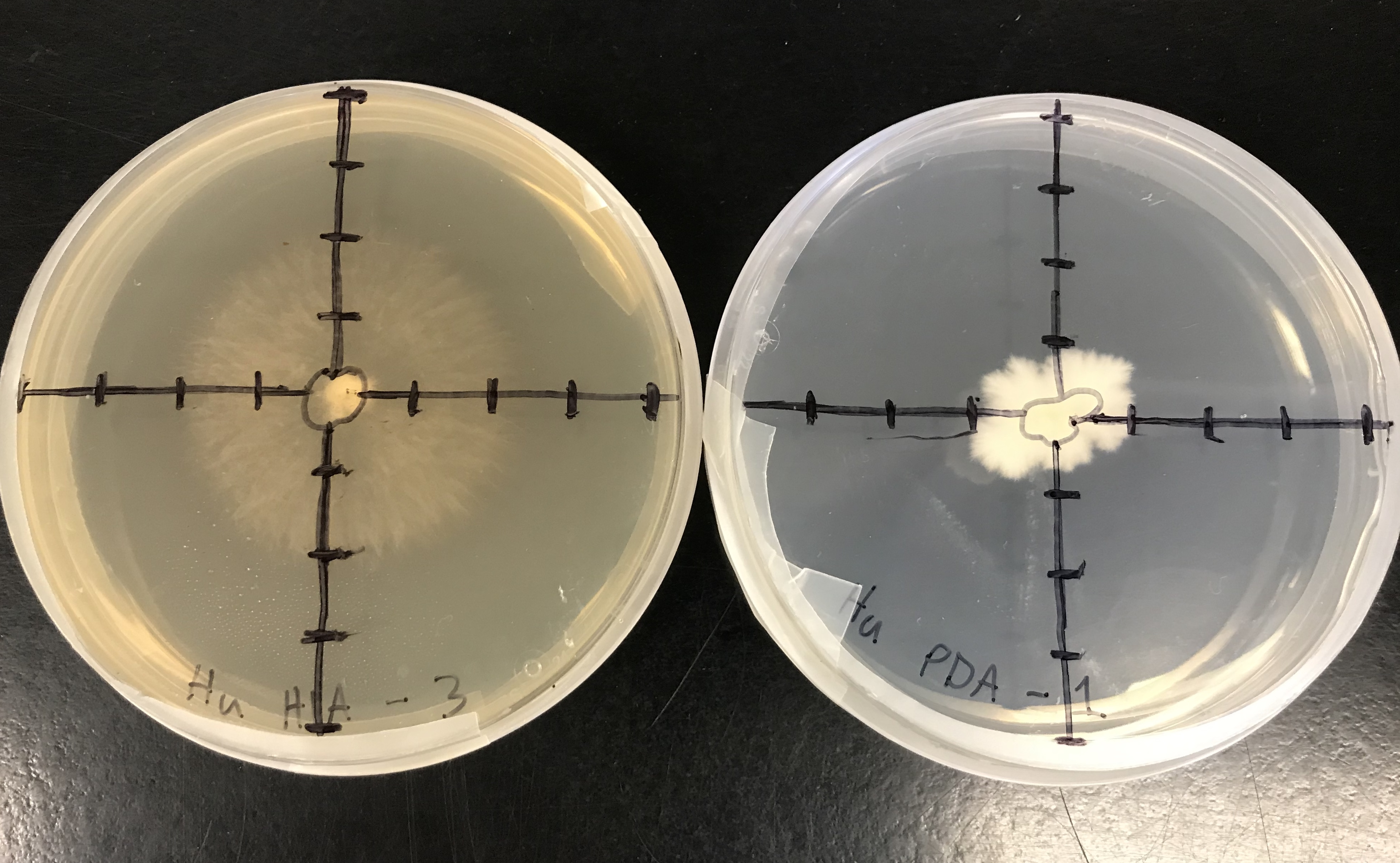
H. ulmarius cultured on hay-infused agar (left) and potato dextrose agar (right) after five days of growth at room temperature

The Hypsizygus ulmarius mushroom commonly grows on tree species like elm, box elder (Acer negundo), and beech, though it may be found on other trees as well. Elm oyster mushrooms are known to grow high up in the wounds or scars of the host tree. They are found in temperate forests across North America, Europe and Asia. Despite how widespread they are, the mushrooms are relatively rare compared to their Pleurotus spp. lookalikes.

H. ulmarius is considered both a saprotroph and parasite as it is not clear whether it feeds on live or dead tissue of its hosts, though it is found on live trees. This species causes brown rot on damaged areas of its host species. Interestingly, however, this species also has a moderate ability to dissolve lignin, too, like a white rot fungus. The fungus accomplishes this by using a complex suite of enzymes that dissolve both cellulose and lignin like laccase. It is not unheard of for brown-rot fungi to produce laccase, an enzyme primarily involved in the lignin degradation process, but the fungus's use of the enzyme is rather uncommon. This production of a brown rot also helps differentiate the fungus from Pleurotus spp., which are mainly white rot fungi.

This species is also easily culturable on a variety of media types. It can also be grown in similar substrates as true oyster mushrooms: paper, straw, logs, etc.

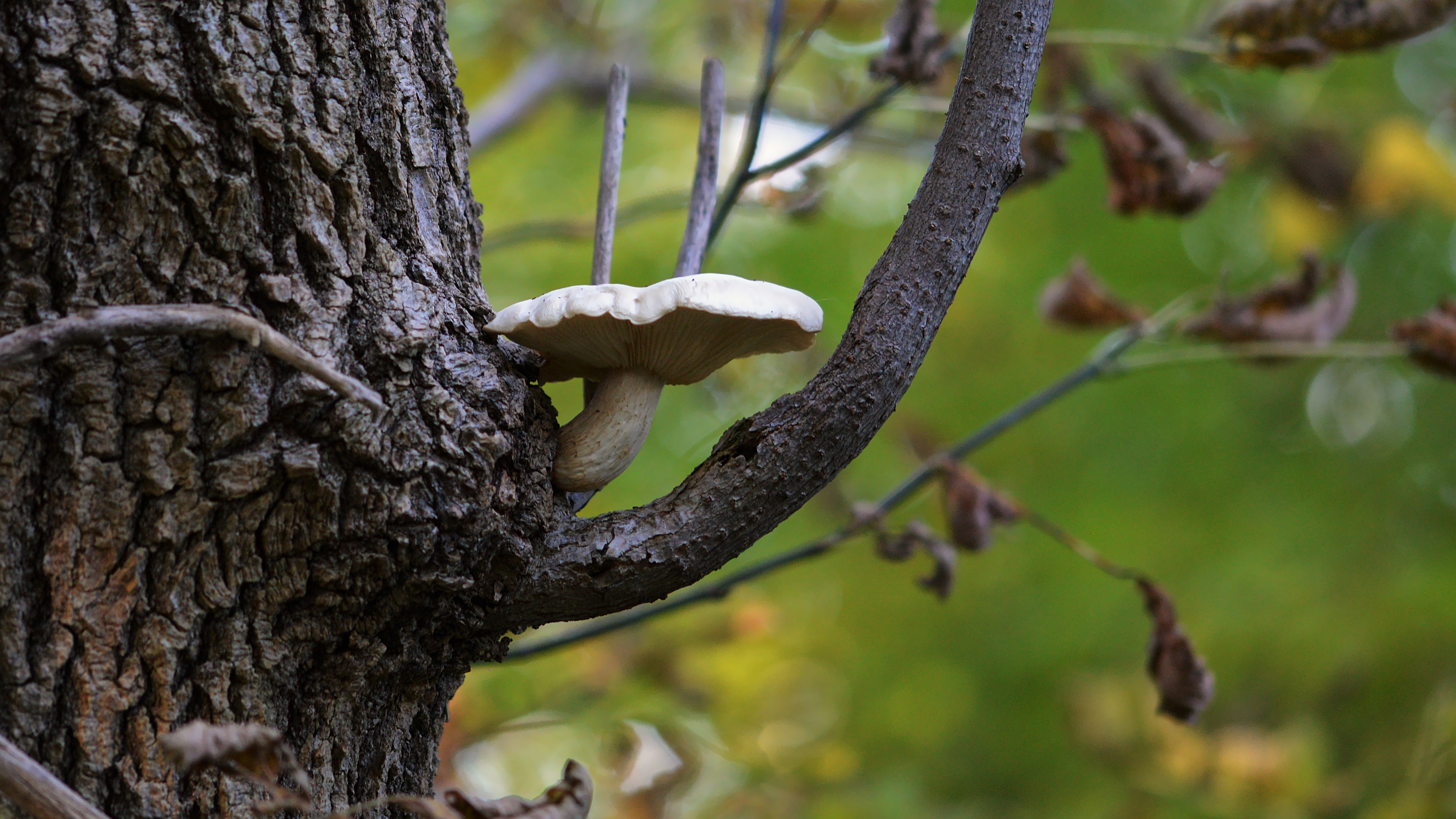
Growing from a tree wound

== Uses ==
=== Culinary ===
Although many foragers feel that Hypsizygus ulmarius mushrooms are tougher and do not taste as good as oyster mushrooms in the Pleurotus genus, they are still sought after in the wild. There are even commercially available kits to grow these mushrooms at home. Like most edible mushrooms, they are good sources of protein, fiber, and vitamin B.

=== Human health ===
There is both historical and modern interest in the possible medicinal applications of Hypsizygus ulmarius. Studies have found compounds in both the mycelium and the fruiting body believed to be anti-inflammatory, antioxidant, antitumor and antidiabetic. It is considered a medicinal fungus in China.

=== Mycoremediation ===
Mycoremediation refers to the breakdown and removal of toxins from the environment using fungi. Hypsizygus ulmarius has the demonstrated potential to accomplish this in a couple different ways. For example, the fungus uses the enzyme laccase to help decompose the lignin in the tissue of its host tree. Because this enzyme has low substrate specificity, it may be used to biodegrade materials like plastics. Scientists are researching what affects laccase production in order to take advantage of this enzyme’s many uses. Additionally, laccase produced by H. ulmarius has also been shown to degrade different dyes, which could prove useful in treating water.
