= List of Russian chemists =

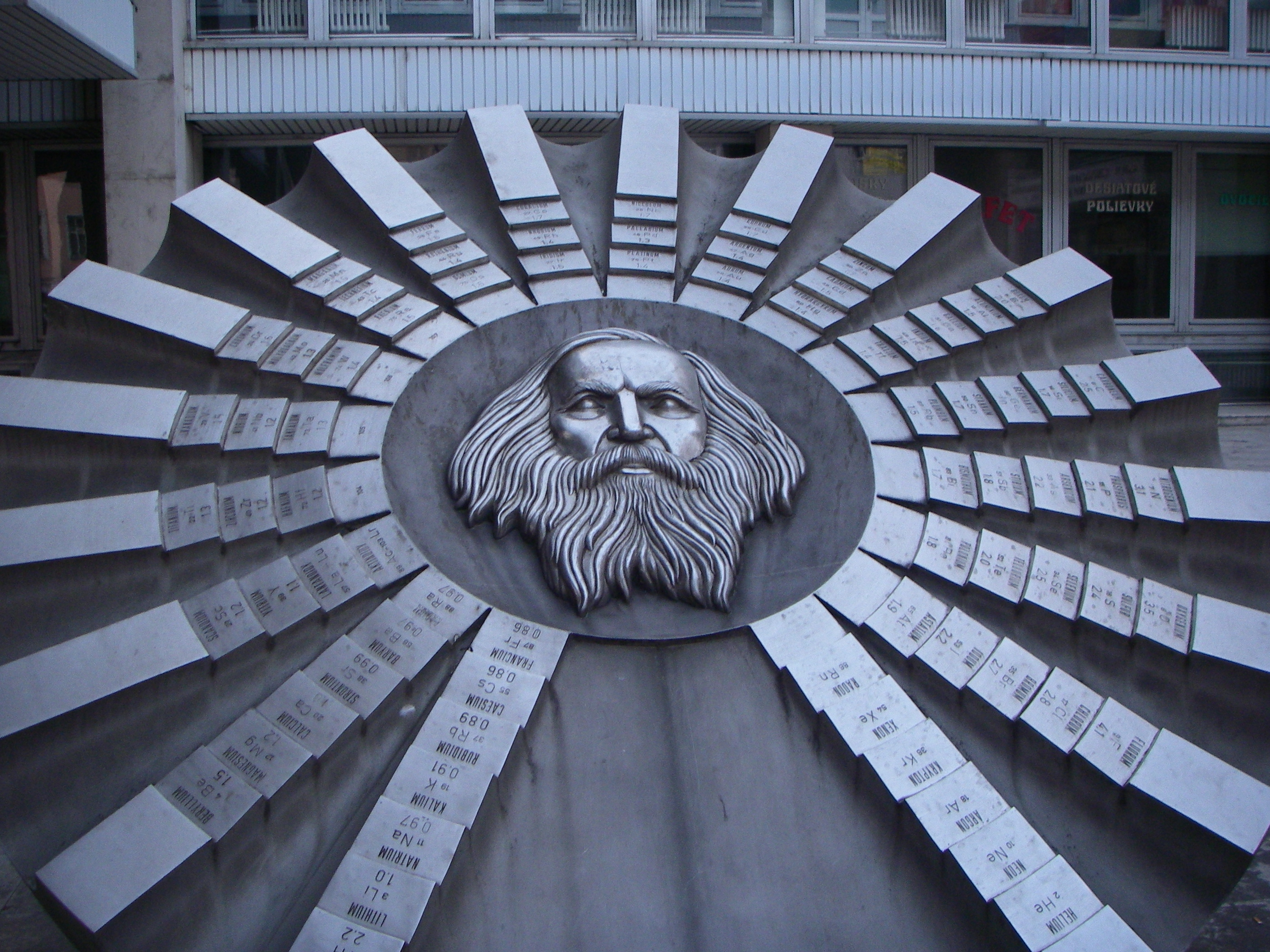
A sculpture in honor of Dmitry Mendeleev and his Periodic table in Slovakia

This list of Russian chemists includes the famous chemists and material scientists of the Russian Federation, the Soviet Union, the Russian Empire and other predecessor states of Russia.

== Alphabetical list ==
=== A ===
- Aleksandr Arbuzov, discovered Arbuzov reaction.

=== B ===
- Alexander Baykov, an academician of the USSR Academy of Sciences.
- Ernest Beaux, inventor of Chanel No. 5, "the world's most legendary fragrance"
- Nikolay Beketov, inventor of aluminothermy, a founder of physical chemistry
- Friedrich Konrad Beilstein, proposed the Beilstein test for the detection of halogens, author of the Beilstein database in organic chemistry
- Boris Belousov, chemist and biophysicist, discoverer of Belousov–Zhabotinsky reaction, a classical example of non-equilibrium thermodynamics
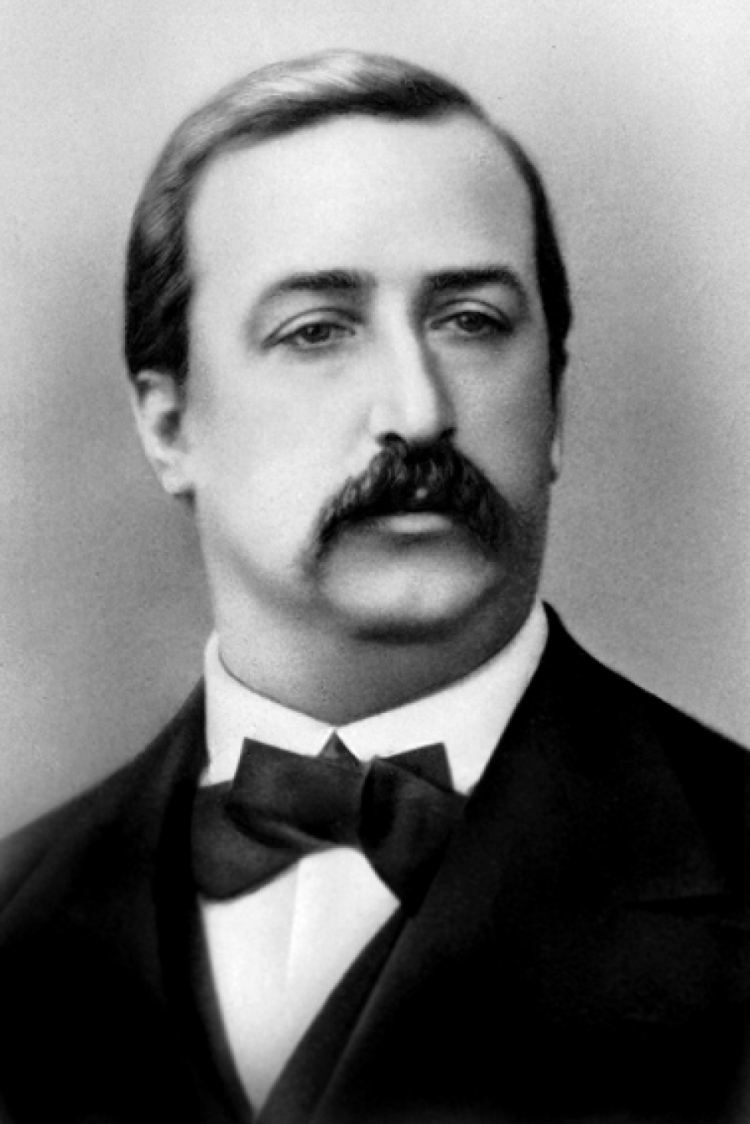
  Borodin
- Alexander Borodin, chemist and composer, the author of the famous opera Prince Igor, discovered Borodin reaction, co-discovered Aldol reaction
- Aleksandr Butlerov, discovered hexamine, formaldehyde and formose reaction (the first synthesis of sugar), the first to incorporate double bonds into structural formulae, a founder of organic chemistry and the theory of chemical structure

=== C ===
- Dmitry Chernov, founder of modern metallography, discovered polymorphism in metals, built the iron-carbon phase diagram
- Aleksei Chichibabin, discovered Chichibabin pyridine synthesis, Bodroux–Chichibabin aldehyde synthesis and Chichibabin reaction
- Lev Chugaev, discoverer of Chugaev elimination in organic chemistry
- Karl Ernst Claus, chemist and botanist, discoverer of ruthenium
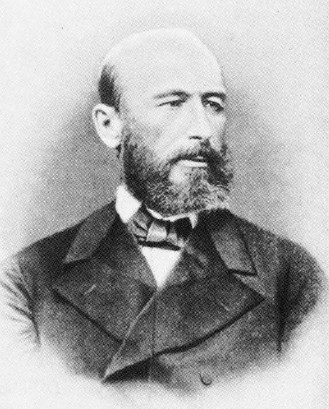
  Butlerov

=== D ===
- Nikolay Demyanov, discoverer of Demjanov rearrangement in organic chemistry
- Aleksandr Dianin, discoverer of Bisphenol A and Dianin's compound
- Anton Dumansky, a founder of colloidal chemistry

=== F ===
- Constantin Fahlberg, inventor of saccharin, the first artificial sweetener
- Alexey Favorsky, discoverer of Favorskii rearrangement and Favorskii reaction in organic chemistry
- Alexander Frumkin, a founder of modern electrochemistry, author of the theory of electrode reactions
- Evgraf Fedorov, first to enumerate all of the 230 space groups of crystals, thus founding the modern crystallography
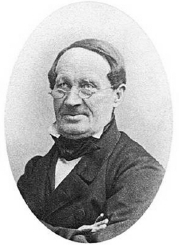
  Claus

=== G ===
- Andre Geim, inventor of graphene, developer of gecko tape, Nobel Prize in Physics winner
- Igor Gorynin, inventor of weldable titanium alloys, high strength aluminium alloys, and many radiation-hardened steels

=== H ===
- Germain Henri Hess, (1802–1850), Swiss-born Russian chemist. Namesake of Hess's law.
- Victor Henri (1872–1940), French physical chemist of Russian parents.

=== I ===
- Vladimir Ipatieff, inventor of Ipatieff bomb, a founder of petrochemistry
- Isidore, legendary inventor of the Russian vodka

=== J ===
- Boris Jacobi, re-discovered electroplating and initiated its practical usage
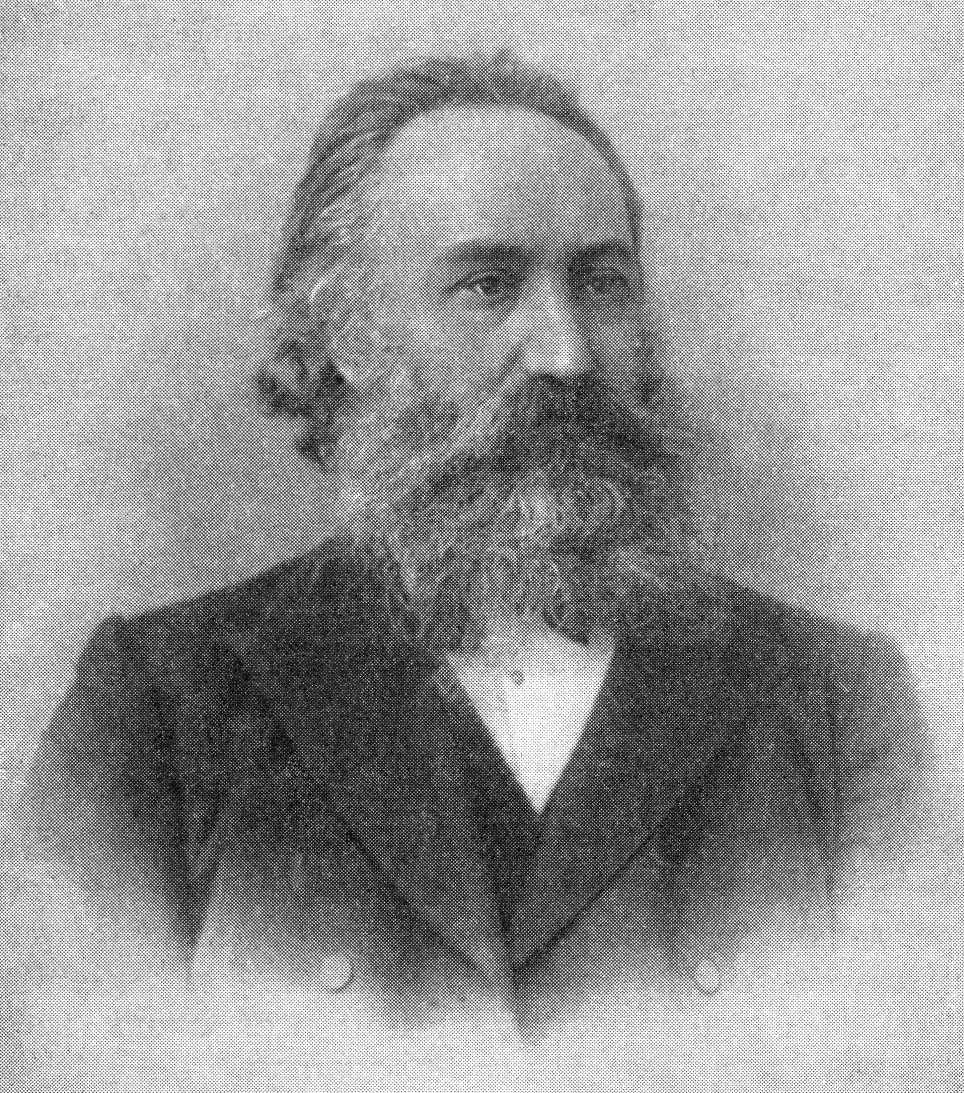
  Fyodorov

=== K ===
- Pyotr Kapitsa, discovered superfluidity while studying liquid helium, Nobel Prize in Physics winner
- Salambek Khadzhiyev, petrochemist who specialized in the production of low-pour, high-density petroleum fuels transformations of hydrocarbons on zeolite
- Morris Kharasch, inventor of anti-microbial compound thimerosal
- Gottlieb Kirchhoff, discoverer of glucose
- Ivan Knunyants, inventor of poly-caprolactam, founder of Soviet school of fluorocarbon's chemistry, a developer of Soviet chemical weapons

=== L ===
- Sergei Lebedev, inventor of polybutadiene, the first commercially viable synthetic rubber
- Mikhail Lomonosov, polymath, coined the term physical chemistry,
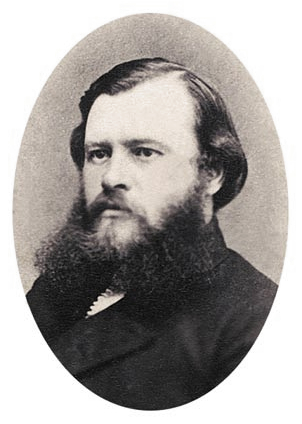
  Markovnikov
  re-discovered smalt and founded the scientific study of glass, proved that the phlogiston theory was false, the first to record the freezing of mercury
- Aleksandr Loran, inventor of fire fighting foam

=== M ===
- Vladimir Markovnikov, author of the Markovnikov's rule in organic chemistry, discoverer of naphthenes
- Yurii Sh. Matros, Russian-American chemist and chemical engineer, developer of Matros reactor, founder of Matros Technologies Inc.
- Dmitri Mendeleyev, invented the Periodic table of chemical elements, the first to predict the properties of elements yet to be discovered, invented pyrocollodion, developer of pipelines and a prominent researcher of vodka
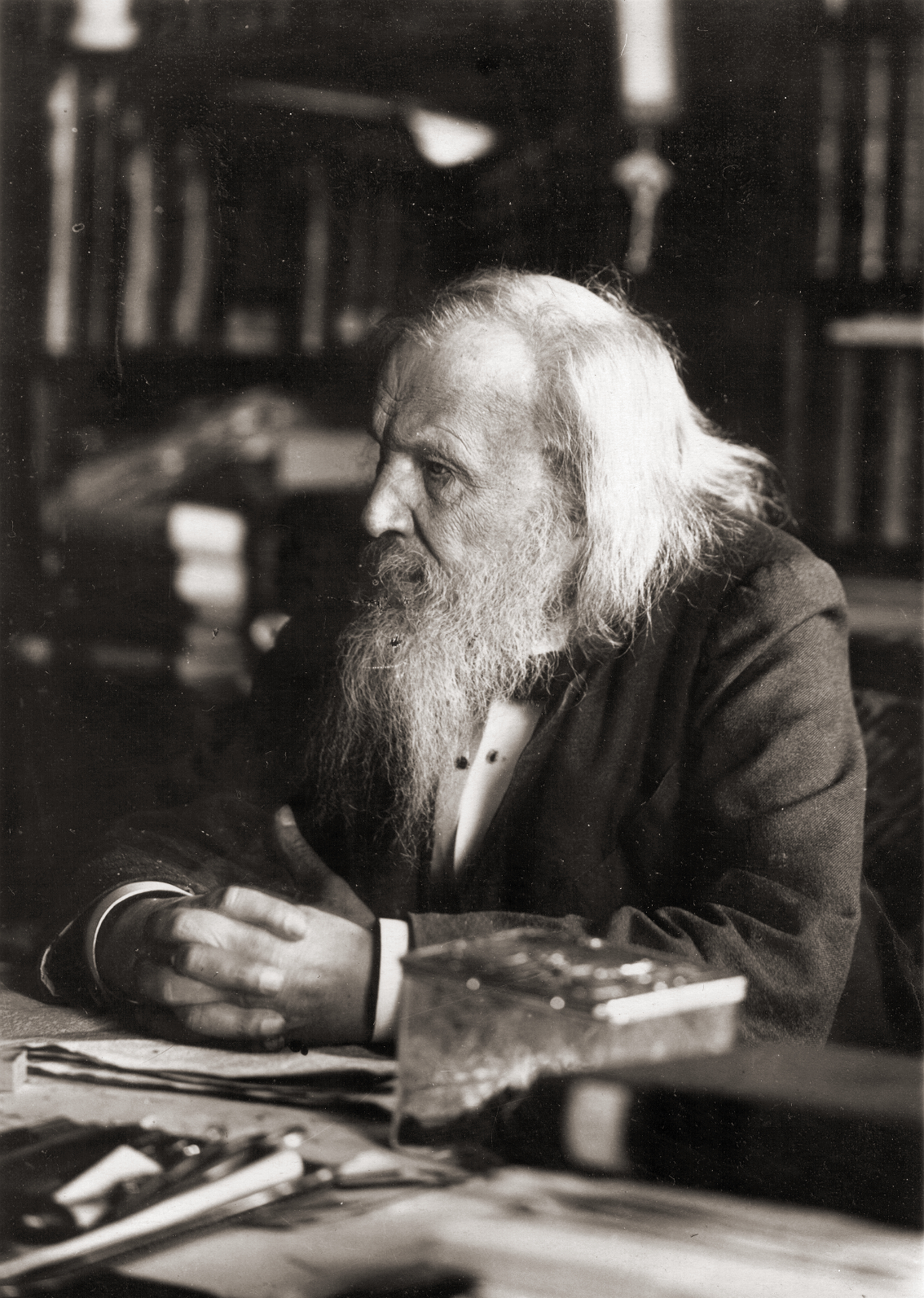
  Mendeleev
- Nikolai Menshutkin, discoverer of Menshutkin reaction in organic chemistry

=== N ===
- Sergey Namyotkin, prominent researcher of terpenes, discoverer of Nametkin rearrangement
- Konstantin Novoselov, inventor of graphene, developer of gecko tape, Nobel Prize in Physics winner

=== O ===
- Anatoly V. Oleynik, researcher in photochemistry.

=== P ===
- Ilya Prigogine, researcher of dissipative structures, complex systems and irreversibility, Nobel Prize winner

=== R ===
- Sergey Reformatsky, discoverer of Reformatsky reaction in organic chemistry

=== S ===
- Nikolay Semyonov, chemical physicist, author of the chain reaction theory, Nobel Prize winner
- Carl Schmidt, analyzed the crystal structure of many biochemicals, proved that animal and plant cells are chemically similar
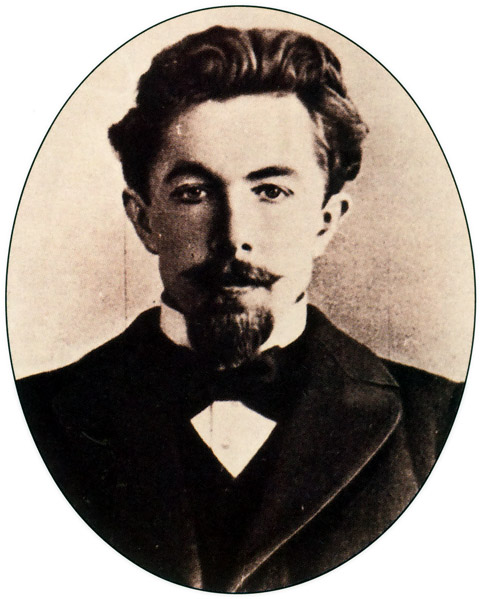
  Tsvet
- Vladimir Shukhov, polymath, inventor of chemical cracking
- Mikhail Shultz, physical chemist and artist; one of the creators the glass electrode theory; author of several thermodynamic methods.

=== T ===
- Nikolai Trifonov, chemistry professor mentioned in The Gulag Archipelago
- Mikhail Tsvet, botanist, inventor of chromatography

=== V ===
- Victor Veselago, first researcher of materials with negative permittivity and permeability
- Vera Bogdanovskaia, first woman to have died in the cause of chemistry due to a laboratory explosion

=== W ===
- Paul Walden, discovered the Walden inversion and ethylammonium nitrate (the first room temperature ionic liquid)

=== Z ===
- Alexander Zaitsev, author of the Zaitsev's rule in organic chemistry
- Nikolai Zinin, discovered benzidine, co-discovered aniline, the first President of Russian Physical-Chemical Society
- Nikolay Zelinsky, inventor of activated charcoal gas mask in Europe during World War I, co-discoverer of Hell–Volhard–Zelinsky halogenation, a founder of petrochemistry
- Anatol Zhabotinsky, discoverer of Belousov–Zhabotinsky reaction, a classical example of non-equilibrium thermodynamics

== See also ==
- Bibliography of science and technology in Russia and the Soviet Union
- List of chemists
- List of Russian scientists
- List of Russian inventors
- Science and technology in Russia
