= Solzhenitsyn (disambiguation) =

Aleksandr Solzhenitsyn (1918–2008) was a Russian writer and dissident.

Solzhenitsyn may also refer to:

== People ==
- Ignat Solzhenitsyn (born 1972), Russian American conductor and pianist
- Natalia Solzhenitsyna (born 1939), Russian mathematician and philanthropist

== Other uses ==
- Solzhenitsyn Aid Fund, a charity organisation
- Solzhenitsyn: A Biography, a 1984 book by Michael Scammell
- Solzhenitsyn Prize, a literary award
