= August 1914 (novel) =

1971 novel by Aleksandr Solzhenitsyn

- The cover of the first English edition published by The Bodley Head in 1972
- Author: Aleksandr Solzhenitsyn
- Original title: Август 1914
- Translator: Michael Glenny
- Language: Russian
- Series: The Red Wheel
- Genre: Historical novel
- Publisher: YMCA Press
- Publication date: 1971; 1984
- Publication place: Soviet Union
- Media type: Print (Hardback)
- Pages: 573 pp; 850+ pp (Second version)
- Followed by: November 1916

August 1914 (Russian: Август четырнадцатого) is a Russian novel by Nobel Prize-winning writer Aleksandr Solzhenitsyn about the defeat of the Imperial Russian Army at the Battle of Tannenberg in East Prussia. The novel was completed in 1970, although there is a foreword from the author saying that it is not complete, rather a "first part, or fascicle, of a work in many parts;" first published in 1971, with an English translation the following year. The novel is an unusual blend of fiction narrative and historiography, and has given rise to extensive and often bitter controversy, both from the literary as well as from the historical point of view. The book also contains several interludes noted as "screen" written as set direction for a film.

Some episodes of the book had caused in accusations of the author of anti-Semitism, mostly rebutted at the time, but these were renewed later, regarding Two Hundred Years Together.

== Plot ==
The plot primarily follows Colonel Vorotyntsev, a General Staff officer sent by the Grand Duke's (supreme commander, Russian Army) headquarters to the Russian Second Army invading East Prussia under command of General Alexander Samsonov. Vorotyntsev has been sent to find out exactly what is happening with the Second Army; a second General Staff colonel has been sent to the First Army with the same mission. Distances are great, communications are poor, and the Russian Army is badly prepared for war. Vorotyntsev is there to find out all he can about conditions at the front and then report back to the Grand Duke.

By August 26, the opening day of the 4-day Battle of Tannenberg, Vorotyntsev comes to realize that he cannot return to his headquarters in time to make any difference in the outcome of the battle, and stays with the Second Army to help where he can. Numerous side plots involving other characters, both on the battlefield and elsewhere, fill out the novel. The unprepared army's failures mirror those of the Tsarist regime.

A famous episode in the earlier version of the novel narrates the state of mind of General Samsonov, the Russian commander, after his disastrous defeat in what came to be known as the Battle of Tannenberg. Samsonov, tormented by the scale of the defeat and his fear of reporting this failure to the Tsar, eventually commits suicide. His body is found by a German search party, a bullet wound in his head and a revolver in his hand.

== Later editions ==
In 1984, a new version of the novel, much expanded, was published in an English translation by H.T. (Harry) Willetts. By this time Solzhenitsyn had been a resident of the US for some years. He was able to publish chapters that had been suppressed while he was still living in Russia, given the Soviet censorship of literature, and to add material based on his extensive research at the library of the Hoover Institution. These included chapters on Vladimir Lenin, which were published separately as Lenin in Zurich, and several chapters dealing with Prime Minister Pyotr Stolypin, as well as with the background and personality of Stolypin's murderer, Dmitri Bogrov, and the suspected involvement of the Tsarist Secret Police in this assassination.

== Series ==
At well over 800 pages, the novel constitutes the beginning of the Red Wheel series, continued ten years later with November 1916.

== Adaptations ==
BBC Cymru Wales produced a two-hour radio version of the book for broadcast in August 2014, as part of the national observations of the centenary of the First World War. This was repeated on BBC Radio 3.
