= YSM =

YSM, or ysm, may refer to:

== People ==
- Yadav Shivram Mahajan (1911–2001), Indian politician
- Yésica Sánchez Maya (born 1977), Mexican human rights attorney
- Yosuke Santa Maria (born 1991), Japanese professional wrestler
- Yurii Sh. Matros (1937–2020), Soviet and American chemical engineer

== Transport ==
- Fort Smith Airport (IATA code), Northwest Territories, Canada
- Ystrad Mynach railway station (National Rail code), Wales, UK

== Other uses ==
- Anglesey, Welsh: Ynys Môn (IIGA code), an island off Wales
- Burmese sign language (ISO 639-3 code)
- Yahoo! Search Marketing, a keyword-based Internet advertising service
- Yale School of Management, the graduate business school at Yale University
- Yale School of Medicine, the graduate medical school at Yale University
- Yale School of Music, the graduate music school at Yale University
- Yale Scientific Magazine, published quarterly by undergraduate students at Yale University
- Yourdon Structured Method, a structured design method in the software development life cycle
- Yudh Seva Medal, an Indian military decoration
