= The Red Wheel =

Cycle of novels by Aleksandr Solzhenitsyn

The Red Wheel (Russian: Красное колесо, Krasnoye koleso) is a cycle of novels by Aleksandr Solzhenitsyn, retelling and exploring the passing of Imperial Russia and the birth-pangs of the Soviet Union.

== Background and history ==
Part 1, August 1914 narrates the disastrous opening of World War I from a Russian perspective. Solzhenitsyn says he conceived the idea in 1938, then in 1945 gathered notes for Part 1 in the weeks when he led a Red Army unit into the same Eastern Prussia region where much of the novel takes place, but not until early 1969 did he start writing the novel. August 1914 was finished in late 1970 and submitted for publication to Soviet printing houses, but turned down after he insisted on capitalizing of the word "God". Instead, it appeared abroad, at YMCA Press in Paris, without Solzhenitsyn's knowledge (though he gave his approval as soon as the news reached him).

When Solzhenitsyn was banished and stripped of his citizenship in 1974, his wife and other associates brought his manuscripts and archive out of the Soviet Union to the West, and he continued working on the novel in exile. A few chapters were published by the Russian exile church journal Vestnik in Paris in 1978–79, but it was not until 1984 that the work began to appear again in bookshops. In this year an expanded edition of August 1914 was published by YMCA Press, with additional sections on the revolution of 1905 and the assassination of the Czar's minister Pyotr Stolypin in 1911. A new translation of March 1917 appeared in 2017.

The cycle currently has appeared as:

- August 1914, 1971, expanded 1984
- November 1916, 2 volumes, 1985
- March 1917, 4 volumes, 1989, 2017
- April 1917, 2 volumes, ca 1991 (English translation forthcoming starting November 2025)

The plan in 1970 was to continue up until at least 1922, the point when the Soviet Union formally came into being and when Lenin had to give up his grip on power due to illness. The progress of the work beyond 1917 was no doubt also intended to make it complement the research into the roots of the Soviet labour camp system carried out in The Gulag Archipelago, and it is reasonably clear that Solzhenitsyn also would have brought up other instances of the repression during the civil war, for example a peasants' revolt at Tambov in 1921; this is indicated by a list of locations on which the author asked for help with historical settings, pictures and so on (given in the expanded edition of August 1914 in 1984). A grant from an anonymous donor is enabling the epic cycle of novels to be published in English for the first time.

== English-language editions ==
| Title | Publisher | Translator | Format | U.S. release date | ISBN |
|---|---|---|---|---|---|
| August 1914 | FSG Classics | Harry Willetts | Paperback | August 2014 | ISBN 978-0374534691 |
| November 1916 | FSG Classics | Harry Willetts | Paperback | August 2014 | ISBN 978-0374534707 |
| March 1917, Book 1 | University of Notre Dame Press | Marian Schwartz | Hardcover, Paperback | November 2017 (Hardcover); October 2020 (Paperback) | ISBN 978-0268102654 (Hardcover); ISBN 978-0268102661 (Paperback) |
| March 1917, Book 2 | University of Notre Dame Press | Marian Schwartz | Hardcover, Paperback | November 2019 (Hardcover); October 2022 (Paperback) | ISBN 978-0268106850 (Hardcover); ISBN 978-0268106867 (Paperback) |
| March 1917, Book 3 | University of Notre Dame Press | Marian Schwartz | Hardcover, Paperback | October 2021 (Hardcover); September 2023 (Paperback) | ISBN 978-0268201708 (Hardcover); ISBN 978-0268201715 (Paperback) |
| March 1917, Book 4 | University of Notre Dame Press | Marian Schwartz | Hardcover | October 2024 | ISBN 978-0268208790 |
| April 1917, Book 1 | University of Notre Dame Press | Clare Kitson | Hardcover | November 2025 | ISBN 978-0268210526 |
