= Order of Saint Catherine (disambiguation) =

Order of Saint Catherine may refer to:

- Order of Saint Catherine, awarded to women by Imperial Russia, 1714–1917
- Order of Saint Catherine the Great Martyr, awarded by the Russian Federation since 2012
- Order of Saint Catherine with Mount Sinai, purportedly awarded by the House of Lusignan since 1063
- Order of Saint Catherine, founded by Humbert II of Viennois in the 1330s
