= Order of Gagarin =

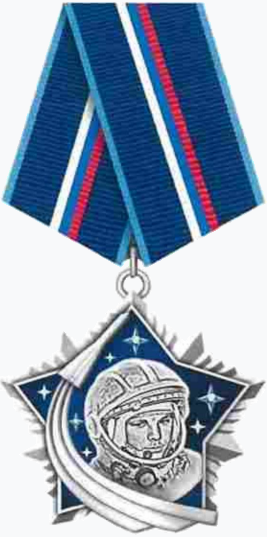
- Awarded for: Outstanding contributions to space exploration, scientific research, and technological innovation
- Presented by: President of Russia
- Established: 27 May 2023
- First award: 16 June 2023; 3 years ago
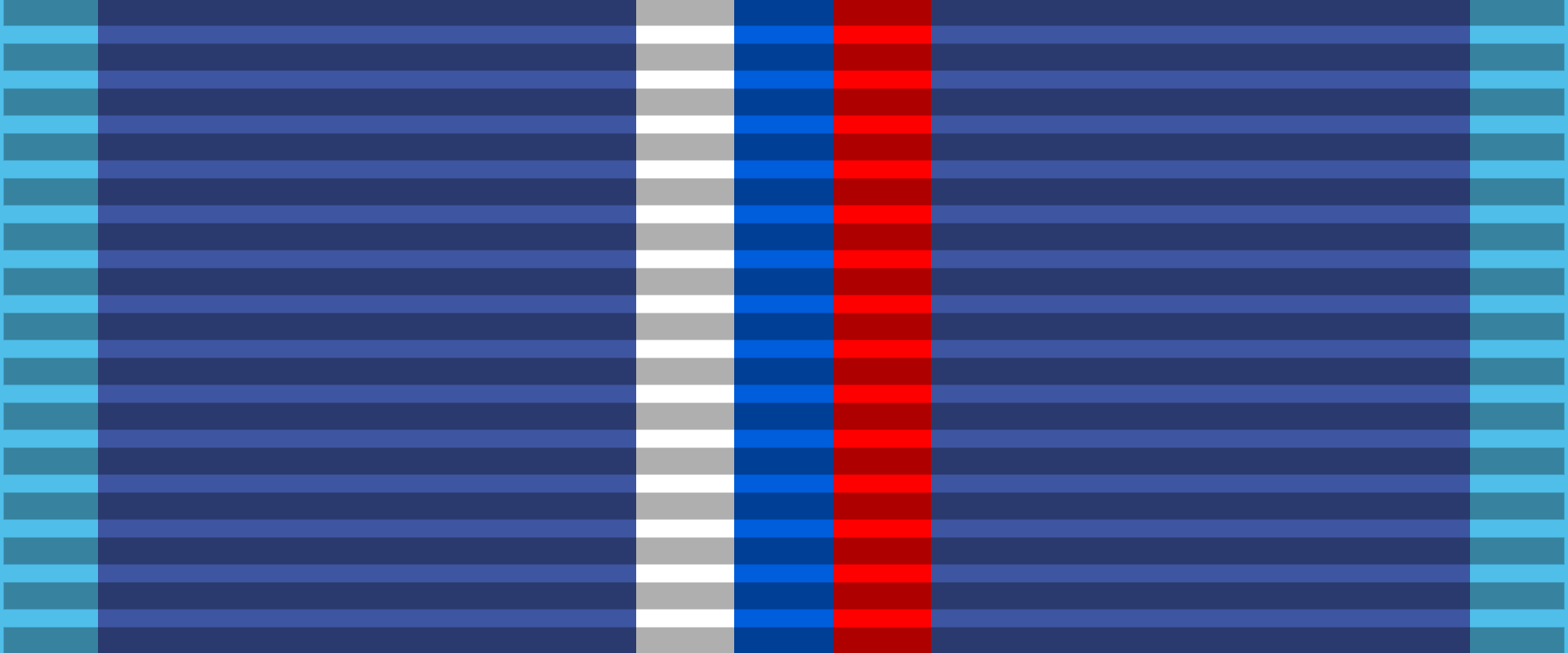
- Ribbon

Precedence
- Next (higher): Order of Saint Catherine the Great Martyr
- Next (lower): Order of Alexander Nevsky

The Order of Gagarin is a high-ranking Russian award established to recognize outstanding contributions to the advancement of the Russian and Soviet space program. Named after the Soviet cosmonaut Yuri Gagarin, who became the first human to journey into space in 1961, the Order of Gagarin was created in 2023 in honor of the 60th anniversary of Valentina Tereshkova's solo mission on the Vostok 6 on 16 June 1963 and the 62nd anniversary of Yuri Gagarin's historic spaceflight aboard the Vostok 1 spacecraft.

== History ==
On April 12, 2023, Yuri Borisov, the Director General of Roscosmos, announced that Russian President Vladimir Putin had approved the proposal by Roscosmos to establish the order in the name of Gagarin. According to the statute approved by the Decree of the President of the Russian Federation on May 27, 2023, No. 385, the Order of Gagarin is awarded to Russian citizens primarily for successful crewed spaceflight, crewed spaceflight programs for exploration, development, and utilization of space. The primary objective of the Order of Gagarin is to acknowledge individuals and organizations that have significantly contributed to the field of space exploration and related scientific disciplines.

The order is worn on the left side of the chest, and if other orders of the Russian Federation are present, it is placed after the Order of Saint Catherine the Great Martyr.

== Notable recipients ==
- Valentina Tereshkova, Hero of the Soviet Union and member of the State Duma.

== See also ==
- Orders, decorations, and medals of Russia
- Medal "For Merit in Space Exploration"
