= YMCA Press =

Publishing house in Paris, France

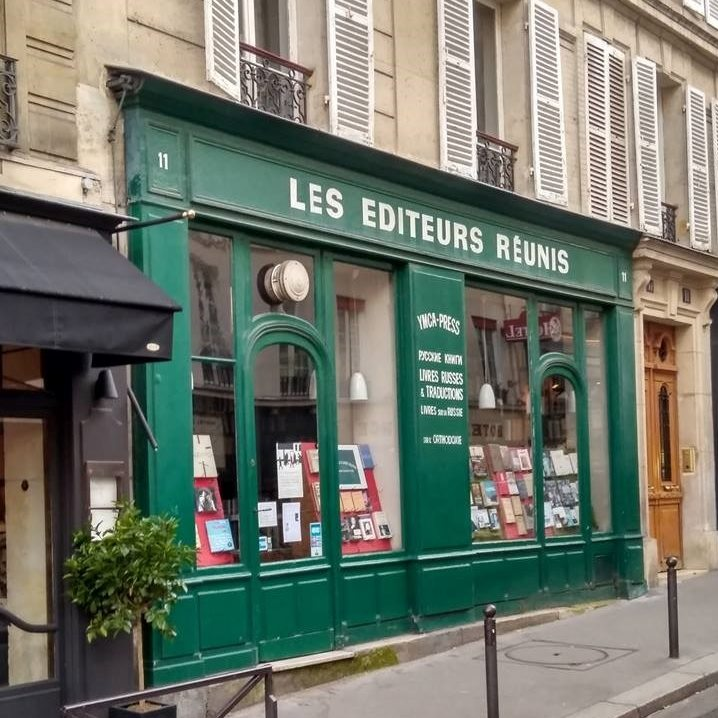
- Trade name: Editions YMCA-Press, Les Editeurs Réunis, Centre culturel Alexandre Soljenitsyne
- Type: Publishing house and bookstore
- Genre: Philosophical or theological essays, Russian literature, novels, art books.
- Founded: 1921 in Prague, 1925 in Paris
- Headquarters: France, Paris, 11 rue de la montage Sainte-Geneviève 75005
- Subsidiaries: Les Editeurs Réunis, Centre culturel Alexandre Soljenitsyne
- Website: https://www.editeurs-reunis.fr

YMCA-Press is a publishing house originally established by the YMCA and located in Paris, also known as Librairie des Editeurs Réunis (bookstore) or Centre culturel Alexandre Soljenitsyne (cultural centre).

It has published many great Russian authors throughout its history, such as Aleksandr Solzhenitsyn, Mikhail Bulgakov, Anna Akhmatova, Marina Tsvetaeva, Ivan Bunin and Osip Mandelstam.

The YMCA had originally formed itself in Russia in 1900 in order to provide "education, religious and philanthropic programs" through Bible classes and the provision of a new gym. YMCA-Press moved to Paris in 1925. Since the 60's, headquarters of the publishing house and the bookstore are located in 11 rue de la Montagne Sainte-Geneviève 75005 Paris.

A cultural centre by the name of Aleksander Solzhenitsyn was founded in 2016 by YMCA-Press and the author's widow. It organizes various exhibitions and conferences on Russian literary heritage.

== History ==
=== First years ===
The original function of the YMCA Press was to provide textbooks and other literature (often on religious subjects) for prisoners of war in Europe, amongst whom it was felt there was a thirst for education. The increase of Russian immigration into the continent after the Russian Revolution appeared to create a market for reproducing similar texts that Russians would easily have found at home, particularly technical and scientific works. However, this plan has been described by one modern commentator as "too grandly conceived and poorly administered" to succeed, whilst the original strategy of concentrating on selling textbooks failed to make an entry into the new market as the émigrés "did not buy that kind of literature." Further, hopes of the YMCA Press entering the Russian domestic market itself were dashed when their production of Russian-language versions of Göschen's until then ever-popular series of scientific pamphlets failed to make an impact in the 1920s. Likewise, the press found itself financially encumbered by its large stock of unsold textbooks.

=== The shift towards orthodoxy and management by Russian emigrants ===
The Press moved its base to Paris in 1925, and began to concentrate on philosophical and religious works, as well as printing the journals of the St. Sergius Orthodox Theological Institute, Pravoslavnaia mysl (Orthodox Way) and the Spiritual Philosophical Academy, Put (The Way). The latter became "an integral element" of the company's output. One of the first books to actually carry the imprint of the YMCA Press was Aleksandr Semonovich Iashchenko's anthology of contemporary Russian religion, and this marked the first shift from publishing textbooks to religious pieces. A combination of entering the market for publishing fiction, as well as the subsidy provided the press by its parent company, enabled it to establish itself as the primary source of intellectual literature for European Russians in the longer term. Indeed, many of the works published by the YMCA Press were written by members of the émigré community, which gave the Press a "sense of unity and coherence." As a result, it has been said, "Russian philosophy flourished in the émigré community for decades" after 1917. Although as a result of the revolution, the Press and its authors were hardly known in Russia at all, it was later described as being responsible for preserving the memories of the émigrés.

During these first years, YMCA-Press published : Vasilij Zenkovsky, Nicolas Troubetskoï, Konstantin Motchulski, Semyon Frank, Ivan Iljin, Nikolay Lossky, Father Sergei Bulgakov, Lev Karsavin, Gueorgy Fedotov ...

Between 1900 and 1940 the YMCA Press was led by Julius Hecker, Paul B. Anderson, and Nikolai Berdyaev; they were followed, at the end of World War II, by Donald Lowrie, Ivan Morozov and Nikita Struve. The latter two weren't Americans, and did not, it has been suggested, "share the perspective and experience" of their predecessors. Moreover, they saw the religious-philiosophical strategy of the Press as "alien and irrelevant." As a result, Paul Anderson managed to transfer ownership of the Press into the hands of the Russian Student Christian Association.

Before the Second World War, YMCA-Press also published exiled Russian writers such as Marc Aldanov, Nina Berberova, Ivan Bunin, Vladislav Khodassevich, Dmitry Merezhkovsky, Aleksey Remizov, Mikhaïl Ossorguine, Boris Zaytsev ...

=== Post-war years and soviet dissent ===
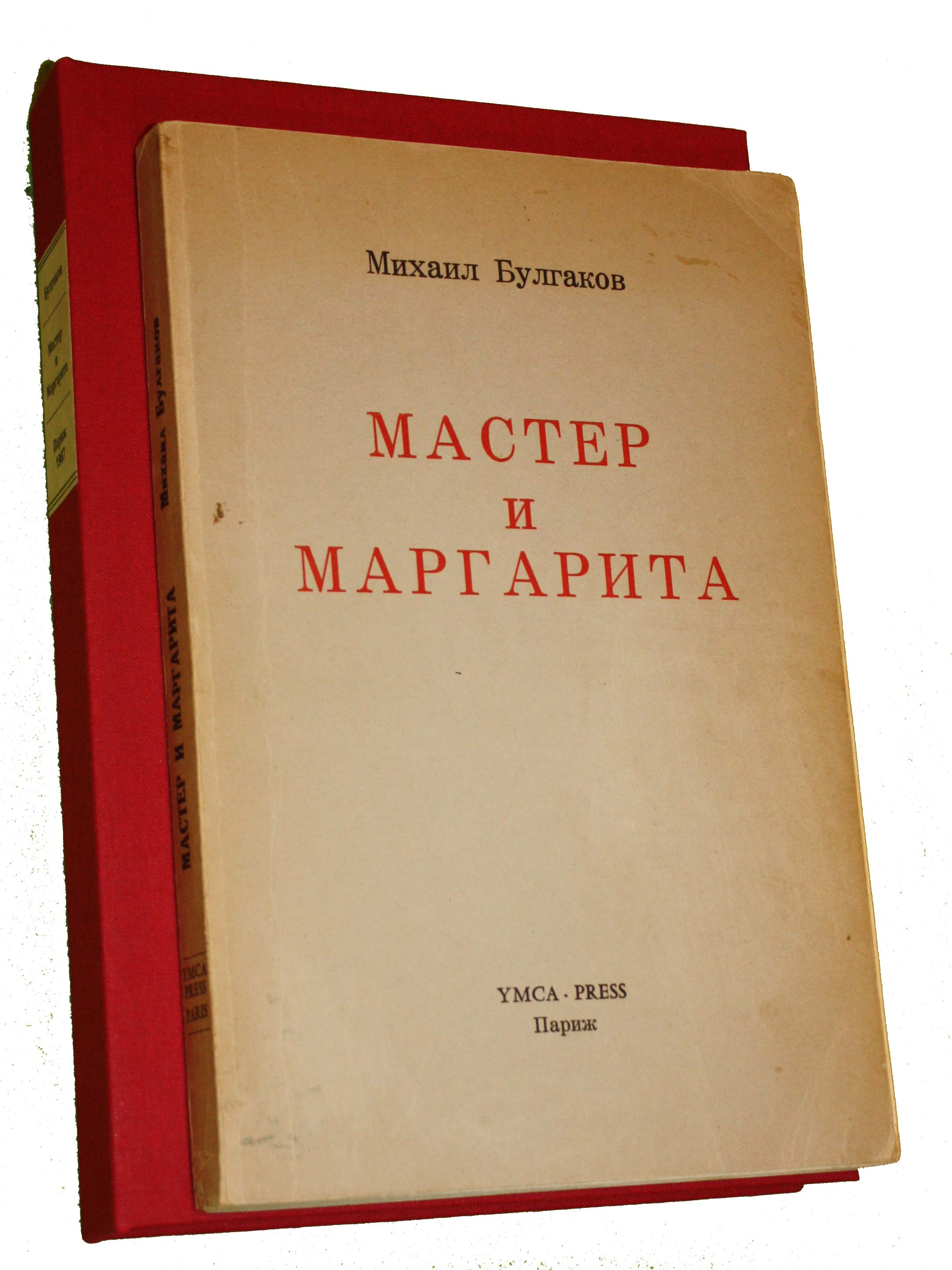
The first book edition of the Master and Marguerita, YMCA-Press 1967.

The YMCA Press now operated with a "different financial basis and with a more openly religious orientation." In the 60s, YMCA-Press published the authors banned or persecuted in the Soviet Union: Anna Akhmatova, Varlam Chalamov, Marina Tsetaeva, Osip Mandelstam, Nadejda Mandelstam, Yury Dombrovsky, Andrei Platonov, Lydia Chukovskaya.

Mikhail Bulgakov's famous "The Heart Of A Dog" will be published for the first time by YMCA-Press in Paris in 1969, with a cover by Yuri Annenkov, artist-painter who emigrated in 1924 to Paris, who will also make many other covers for the publishing house. The "Master and Margarita", his most famous novel, will also be published by YMCA-Press in 1967, 20 years before its publication in the Soviet Union.

==== The Gulag Archipelago ====
One of YMCA-Press most famous publications was in 1968. This was the first unabridged version of Aleksandr Solzhenitsyn's Cancer Ward, and was followed in 1973 (for which it received "worldwide attention") by his three-volume of The Gulag Archipelago, 1918–1956, which sold 50,000 copies in its first few weeks of sale.

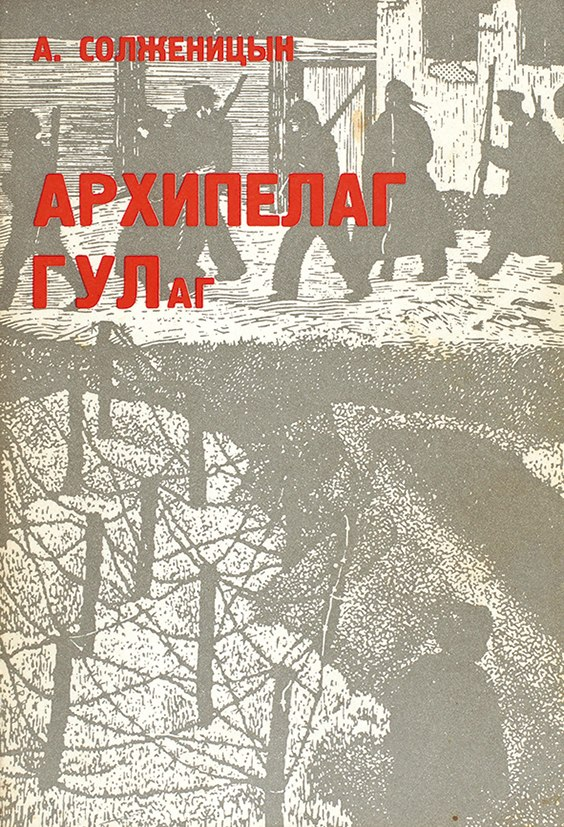
Cover of the first edition of the Gulag Archipelago published by YMCA-Press in 1973.

Back in 1971, Alexandre Solzhenitsyn, then behind the Iron Curtain, entrusted the publishing house YMCA-Press with the edition of his August 14, the first part of his monumental historical work The Red Wheel. The manuscript was sent in great secrecy to the West, thanks to an "invisible", Assia Durova, employee of the French Embassy in Moscow. The work carried out by the publishing house fully met the author's requirements, who then decided to entrust the publishing house with an even more important and secretive work, his Gulag Archipelago. In great clandestineness, in Serge Béresniak's Yiddish and eastern-languages parisian printing press, the typographer Léonid Lifar, brother of the ballet dancer Serguei Lifar, composed the first volume of the book.

By the end of 1973, the book was completed and published: it received "worldwide attention". The YMCA-Press Russian version of the book was published in 50,000 copies. The draw quickly ran out.

As a consequence of the book's publication, Solzhenitsyn was arrested in February 1974, and expelled from the Soviet Union. He settled in Zurich, where he met his publisher Nikita Struve for the first time. It was there that he wrote the chapters devoted to Lenin in The Red Wheel.

In 1975, Solzhenitsyn visited the company's Parisian office, where he met the former head of YMCA-Press, Nikita Struve and the staff, received an invitation to the United States by Anderson, and presented the latter with a book. This Solzhenitsyn had inscribed, thanking Anderson for "how much he ha[d] done for Russian culture." The Nobel Laureate, in his memoirs later, described YMCA-Press as "selfless."

==== Post-Archipelago years ====
The years of forced exile were the fruitful years of collaboration between Solzhenitsyn and YMCA-Press. Solzhenitsyn not only publishes his new books there, but he also directs from Vermont, where he settles, two collections of books :

- ИНРИ (Исследования новейшей русской истории) which offers unpublished works on contemporary Russian history.
- ВМБ (Всероссийская мемуарная библиотека) which includes unpublished memoirs on the period of the Russian Revolution and Soviet Russia.

=== Post Soviet Years ===
In the 1990s, as the Iron Curtain fell, YMCA-Press's editorial activity slowed down.

In 1990, a first exhibition of the YMCA-Press edition was held in Moscow, at the Library of Foreign Literature. Muscovites can learn about the history of the publishing house and acquire its books, delivered from Paris. This exhibition was presented in Kyiv and Saint Petersburg.

In 1991 Russkiy Put Publishing House was founded by YMCA-Press in Moscow, first as a Russian subsidiary, then as an independent company to take over the work of publishing and promoting Russian literary heritage.

In 1995 the House of Russian Abroad was founded by YMCA-Press and Russkiy Put director Nikita Struve, Aleksandr Solzhenitsyn and Viktor Moskvin to preserve and promote archives from Russian diasporas and emigrations history. It is located in the Tagansky district in Moscow.

== YMCA-Press today ==
YMCA-Press is still active in Paris, it acts as a bridge between Russian and French cultures and wishes to promote a certain approach to Russian culture faithful to the heritage of emigration. For this, a cultural center named after Alexandr Solzhenitsyn was created, it is located on the second floor of the Parisian headquarters. The bookstore still operates in the heart of the Latin Quarter and welcomes many students and scholars of Russian literature.

The publishing house, after a few years at half mast after the fall of the Soviet Union, is now publishing again.

Since 2016 and the relaunch of its publishing activities by Nikita Struve, Melanie Struve-Rakovitch, Victor Moskvin and Natalia Solzhenitsyna, YMCA-Press has published :

- Les Douze - Alexandre Blok, translated and foreword by Georges Nivat, 2016, co-published with Russkyi Put'.
- La vie de Tourgueniev - Boris Zaïtsev, translated by Anne Kichilov, foreword by Tatiana Victoroff, 2018.
- Études & Miniatures - Alexandr Solzhenitsyn, foreword by Georges Nivat, 2019.
- Anthologie de la poésie russe du début du XXIe siècle, foreword by Tatiana Victoroff, 2020.
- Poèmes de Iouri Jivago - Boris Pasternak, translated by Hélène Péras, foreword by Hélène Henry, 2020.
- Vivre pleinement - Ivan Bunin, translated by Anne-Marie Tatsis-Botton, Anna Lushenkova-Foscolo and Hélène Henry, 2020.
- Anthologie de la poésie russe - XIXe siècle by Nikita Struve, reprint in 2021.
- Anthologie de la poésie russe, la renaissance du XXe siècle, by Nikita Struve, reprint in 2021
- Cinq essais sur Pouchkine - Semyon Frank, translation by Anne Kichilov, avertissement by Georges Nivat, posface of Father Ignace Krekchine, critical dossier by Jean-Louis Backès and Olga Sedakova, 2021
- Dostoïevski et la logique - Jean-Louis Backès, foreword by Michel Eltchaninoff, 2021
