= Nicolas Miletitch =

French former editor-in-chief of Agence France-Presse

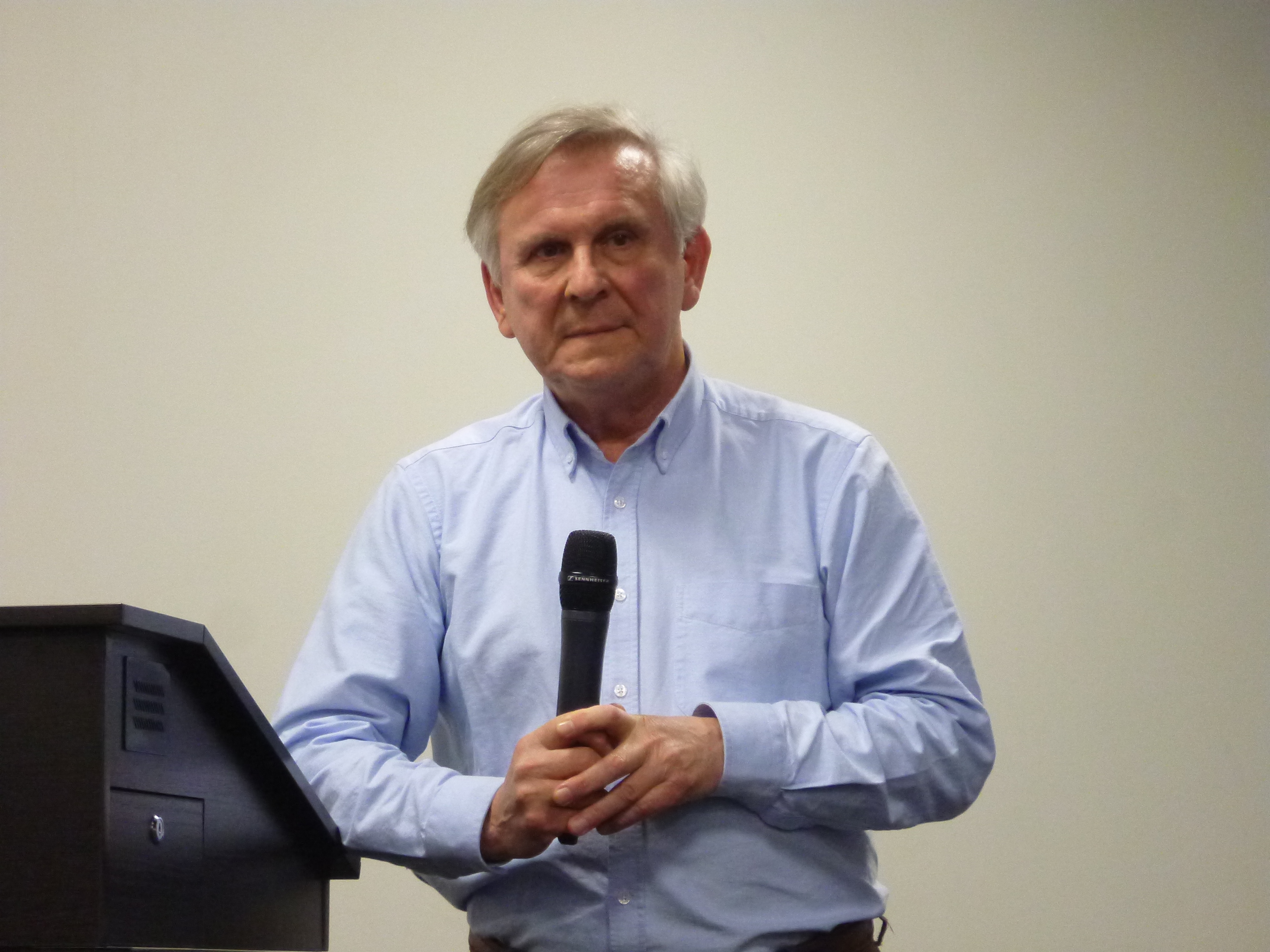
Portrait of Nicolas Miletitch

Nicolas Miletitch was the editor-in-chief of the Agence France-Presse (AFP) from 2006 to June 2009.

== Career ==
He joined the AFP in 1977. In 1978–81, he served as a correspondent in Moscow from where he was expelled owing to his connections with dissidents. Later, he was a head of the AFP bureau in Belgrade (1988–94) and Moscow (1998–2001). In 2003, Miletitch became editor-in-chief for Europe & Africa, and from 2006 to 2009 was the editor-in-chief of the AFP. He has been appointed Moscow bureau chief in 2010.

In 1998, in his book Trafics et crimes dans les Balkans, he published his study of organized crime in the Balkans.

In 2008, he, along with Jean Crépu, made the television documentary L'Histoire Secrète de l'Archipel du Goulag. The documentary covers events related to creation and publication of The Gulag Archipelago by Aleksandr Solzhenitsyn. Thanks to his reputation as a man risking danger to help what was arguably a genuine resistance movement in the USSR while posted there as a journalist, Nicolas Miletitch received precious help in the making of his documentary from Solzhenitsyn himself and the "invisibles" – members of an underground network that provided precious data on the history of the camps and also helped Solzhenitsyn escape police surveillance, secretly write, make copies, conceal and smuggle the monumental manuscript of The Gulag Archipelago. These "invisibles" are the subject of the documentary. The extensive interview granted by Aleksandr Solzhenitsyn for L'Histoire Secrète de l'Archipel du Goulag is his last filmed appearance.

An English language version of L'Histoire Secrète de l'Archipel du Goulag was projected during a premiere at the American University of Paris in 2010, but it has never been shown or broadcast since then.

== TV documentary ==
- L'Histoire Secrète de l'Archipel du Goulag (online in Russian)
