= Karl Ernst Claus =

Russian chemist and naturalist (1796–1864)

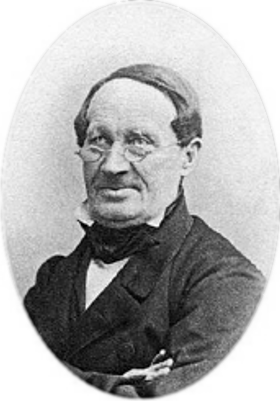
- Born: 22 January 1796; Dorpat, Livonia Governorate, Russian Empire
- Died: 24 March 1864 (aged 68); Dorpat, Livonia Governorate, Russian Empire
- Education: University of Dorpat
- Known for: Discovery of ruthenium
- Awards: Demidov Prize
- Scientific career
- Fields: Chemistry; pharmacy; botany
- Workplaces: University of Dorpat; Kazan University

Karl Ernst Claus, also known as Karl Klaus or Carl Claus (Russian: Карл Ка́рлович Кла́ус, romanized: Karl Karlovich Klaus; 22 January 1796 – 24 March 1864), was a Russian chemist and naturalist. Claus was a professor at Kazan University and a member of the Russian Academy of Sciences. He was primarily known as a chemist and discoverer of the chemical element ruthenium, which he named after his homeland of Russia, but also as one of the first scientists who applied quantitative methods in botany.

== Early life and education ==
Karl Claus was born in 1796 in Dorpat, Livonia Governorate, Russian Empire, as the son of a painter. At the age of four, he lost his father and two years later became an orphan. In 1810, he moved to Saint Petersburg and started working as an assistant in a pharmacy. Although he had not received formal education, at age 21, Claus managed to pass the State exam in the pharmacy at the Military Medical Academy of St. Petersburg, becoming the youngest pharmacist in Russia at that time. Later in 1826, he established his own pharmacy in Kazan.

In 1821, Claus married Ernestine Bate whom he knew since his youth. They had three daughters born in Kazan and later a son, when they moved back to Dorpat.

== Botany ==
In 1827, Claus became involved, as an assistant of Eduard Friedrich Eversmann, in the botanical research of the steppes of the rivers Ural and Volga. He later used the collected data in his work Flora der Wolgagegenden (Flora of the Volga Region).

In 1834, while still studying at the University of Dorpat, Claus went into another botanic trip to the trans-Volga steppes – this time with chemistry professor Gebel. The results of this expeditions were published in 1837–1838.

== Chemistry ==
In 1828, when he already turned 32, Claus decided to continue his education at the University of Dorpat. During the course of his studies, in 1831, he started working as an assistant at the chemical laboratory of the university. He graduated in 1835, and in 1837, defended his PhD thesis on analytical phytochemistry ("Grundzüge der Analytischen Phytochemie") at the University of Dorpat. In the same year, he applied at the St. Petersburg Medical-Surgical Academy for an academic position and obtained a post of the head of chemical laboratory at Kazan State University. In 1839, he defended habilitation thesis on separation of minerals in mineral waters and was appointed an assistant professor. He became full professor in chemistry in 1844.

== Ruthenium ==
In 1840, Claus, received a substantial amount of platinum ore samples for his studies from the Ural Mountains and the St Petersburg Mint and started working on chemistry and isolation of noble metals, in particular rhodium, iridium, osmium, and to a lesser extent, palladium and platinum. In 1844, he discovered a new chemical element, which he named ruthenium after Russia using the Latin name Ruthenia. Choosing the name for the new element, he stated: "I named the new body, in honour of my Motherland, ruthenium. I had every right to call it by this name because Mr. Osann relinquished his ruthenium and the word does not yet exist in chemistry."

Claus managed not only to isolate ruthenium, but also determine its atomic weight and chemical properties. He noted the similarity of the chemical properties of ruthenium, rhodium, palladium and platinum and meticulously documented his results. For this discovery, he was awarded the Demidov Prize of 5,000 rubles (which was of much financial help to his large family). He sent samples of new element for analysis to Jöns Jakob Berzelius, who was one of the most renowned scientists in the field of new elements, and thereby became known to European scientists.

== Health and late years ==
Claus was known for his negligent attitude towards his health. In particular, he often tasted his chemicals and new compounds and tested the strength of the acids by dipping a finger in them and touching his tongue with it. Once he severely burned his mouth while tasting one of the new ruthenium compounds that he had synthesized. When he isolated osmium tetroxide – a rather toxic chemical – he described its taste as astringent and pepper-like. In April 1845, he was poisoned by osmium tetroxide vapors and had to stop working for two weeks. In 1852, Klaus moved from Kazan back to the University of Dorpat and assumed position of professor in pharmacy. He died in Dorpat in 1864.

== See also ==
- List of Baltic German scientists
- List of Russian chemists
