= Clare Kitson =

British film programmer, animation commissioner and writer

Clare Kitson is a British film programmer and writer on animation. She was Channel 4's commissioning editor for animation from 1989 to 1999. She wrote British Animation: The Channel 4 Factor (2008), an account of the channel's animation commissioning, and a study of Yuri Norstein's Tale of Tales. In 2018, she was chosen for the Lotte Reiniger Lifetime Achievement Award at the European Animation Awards.

== Education ==
Kitson studied French and German at St Anne's College, Oxford, and came to animation through John Halas, helping him with letters for ASIFA, the International Animated Film Association. She later wrote that this work "set me on my course, programming, commissioning and writing about animation".

== Career ==
She programmed animation for the Los Angeles County Museum in 1970 and 1971, was US west coast coordinator for the Zagreb animation festival in 1972, and then worked as a programme officer at the National Film Theatre and editor of the London Film Festival booklet.

She succeeded Paul Madden as Channel 4's commissioner for animation in 1989. In a statement published in 1990 she wrote that "those without a track record have to start somewhere", and set out two schemes for new directors: one with the Arts Council and one at the Museum of the Moving Image. Irene Kotlarz writes that Kitson's main aim was to preserve auteur films, "the kind that are expensive, one-off, short, and hard to fund elsewhere", and that she packaged short films for the schedule under the title Fourmations. When her budget rose in 1994 she added adult series, commissioning Sarah Ann Kennedy's Crapston Villas and Candy Guard's Pond Life; Jill McGreal noted that much of the work she commissioned was directed by women. Channel 4 also part-funded Father Christmas and commissioned The Bear during her tenure.

== Writing ==
British Animation: The Channel 4 Factor (2008) is Kitson's account of animation at Channel 4 in the 1980s and 1990s. After a history of how the channel came to fund animation, it looks at 30 films and series, from The Snowman and Creature Comforts to Street of Crocodiles and The Black Dog, setting out for each how it was funded, what it cost, how it was made and what it did for its maker's career; it ends with how that support was lost. Kitson also asks whether television is the right home for animation as an art form, recording the slot each film was given and why a good one could not always be found. Reviewing the book for Skwigly, the filmmaker Lucy Lee called it "a 'How To' if you like, for creating the conditions for developing a great art form". In a 2011 essay Kitson asked whether broadcasting's withdrawal from short animation had cost the wider industry its creativity.

Kitson also wrote Yuri Norstein and Tale of Tales: An Animator's Journey (2005), a study of the Russian animator Yuri Norstein's film, which A. S. Byatt called "an exemplary book".

== Translation ==
Kitson turned to literary translation from Russian after forty years in cinema and television. In 2012 she joined Robert Chandler's Russian group at a literary translation summer school in London, and through it was given two interviews with Aleksandr Solzhenitsyn to translate, which led to her translating a volume of his cycle The Red Wheel. She has translated full-time since 2014. With Melanie Moore she translated Between Two Millstones, Book 2 (2020), the second part of Solzhenitsyn's memoir of his years in the West, and Dina Yafasova's novel Don't Call Me a Victim! (2014); reviewing the novel in World Literature Today, Anastasia Lakhtikova wrote that Moore and Kitson "continue to raise awareness in the West about women and torture through translation". Her translation of April 1917: The Red Wheel, Node IV, Book 1 was published in 2025.

== Selected works ==
=== Books ===
- British Animation: The Channel 4 Factor. Parliament Hill Publishing, 2008.
- Yuri Norstein and Tale of Tales: An Animator's Journey. John Libbey, 2005.

=== Translations ===
- Dina Yafasova, Don't Call Me a Victim! (with Melanie Moore). Glagoslav, 2014.
- Aleksandr Solzhenitsyn, Between Two Millstones, Book 2: Exile in America, 1978–1994 (with Melanie Moore). University of Notre Dame Press, 2020.
- Aleksandr Solzhenitsyn, April 1917: The Red Wheel, Node IV, Book 1. University of Notre Dame Press, 2025.
