= Alla Potapova =

Soviet and Ukrainian writer (1933–2021)

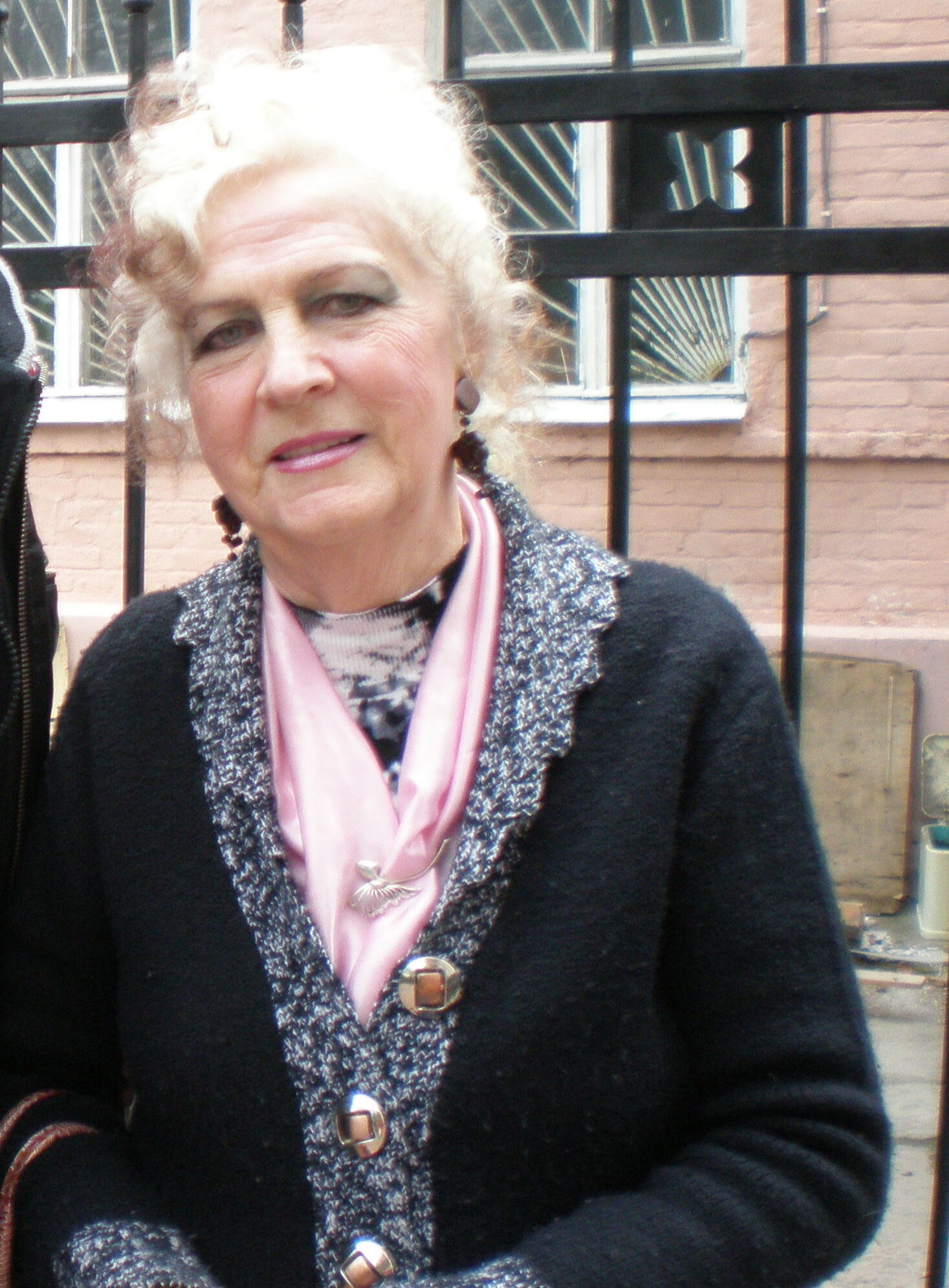
- Alla Potapova
- Born: Alla Vyacheslavivna Popova; 7 August 1933
- Died: July 14, 2021 (aged 87); Kyiv, Ukraine
- Education: Taras Shevchenko National University of Kyiv (1967)

Alla Vyacheslavivna Potapova (born Popova) (7 August 1933 – 14 July 2021) was a Soviet and Ukrainian children's writer and public figure.

== Early life and education ==
Alla Potapova was born on 7 August 1933 in a family of engineers. In 1967, she graduated from the philological faculty of Taras Shevchenko National University of Kyiv.

== Career ==
From 1961 to 67, Potapova worked as a correspondent for the newspapers Komsomolsky Prapor, Robitnycha Gazeta, and the radio Ostanni Novyny. In 1964, she joined the Union of Journalists of the USSR. In 1967–83, Potapova worked as a deputy editor and an editor of the newspaper Robitnyche Slovo. In 1982, she joined the Union of Writers of the USSR.

Since 1983, Potapova has been a deputy chairman of the Union of Writers of Ukraine trade union committee. In 1991, she joined the National Union of Writers of Ukraine. The same year, Potapova founded and headed the All-Ukrainian National Cultural and Educational Society Russian Assembly. In 1997, she became a member of the Kyiv organization of the Union of Writers of Ukraine and a member of the board of the Literary Foundation of the Union of Writers of Ukraine.

From 1983 to 1986, Potapova was an author and a presenter of the program for teenagers Me and You on the children's radio station (Program 1).

Since 1996, Potapova has been the editor-in-chief of the Russkoe Sobranie newspaper. Since 1998, she has been the editor-in-chief of the Novoe Literaturnoe Slovo newspaper. In 2000, Potapova founded the Russian-language literary magazine Russkoe Slovo (Ruslo). In 2001, she became the president of the All-Ukrainian National Cultural and Educational Society "Russkoe Sobranie".

In 1997–2001, Potapova was a member of the Council on Language Policy under the President of Ukraine. She was a co-chairman of the Commonwealth of Ukrainian, Russian, and Belarusian Writers and a chairman of the Jury of the Russian Literary Poetry Prize named after Mykola Ushakov of the National Union of Writers of Ukraine.

Since 2001, Potapova has been a member of the Society of Children's and Youth Writers of Russia and a deputy chairman of the Slavic Committee of Ukraine. She was also a chairman of the executive committee of the Congress of Russian Organizations of Ukraine and a chairman of the Russian Chamber of the Public Council of Ukraine. Potapova is the author of 40 books for children and adults.

Alla Potapova died on 14 July 2021 in Kyiv, Ukraine, at the age of 88.

== Awards and honors ==
- The Diploma of the Presidium of the Verkhovna Rada of Ukrainian SSR (1982)
- The "Golden Pen" Journalism Diploma (1982)
- International Journalism Award "Chennai Nuclear Power Plant: Yesterday, Today, Tomorrow" (1996)
- Laureate of the Volodymyr Korolenko Literary Prize for children's books (1996, 2006)
- Honorary award of the Ministry of Culture and Arts of Ukraine "For Achievements in the Development of Culture and Art" (1998)
- Honored Worker of Culture of Ukraine (2001)
- Honorary Certificate and Medal of the I degree of the International Union of Slavic Journalists (2003)
- Badge of Honor by the mayor of Kyiv (2003)
- Order of Princess Olga III class (2004)
- Order of Friendship of Peoples (2004)
- Order of Venerable Nestor the Chronicler awarded by the Ukrainian Orthodox Church of the Moscow Patriarchate (2006)
- Order of Saint Catherine the Great Martyr, I class (2008)
- Yuriy Dolgoruky Literary Prize (2009)
- "Woman-writer" award in the "Woman of the Year" category awarded by the international public organization "Federation of Women for World Peace" (2010)
- Oleksiy Tolstoy Literary Prize (2011)
