= Nikolai Trifonov =

Soviet chemist

Nikolai Aleksandrovich Trifonov
- Born: Nikolai Aleksandrovich Trifonov; Николай Александрович Трифонов; 23 February 1891; Saint Petersburg
- Died: 9 December 1958 (aged 67); Kazan
- Occupation: Chemist
- Known for: Chemistry professor, mentioned in The Gulag Archipelago

Nikolai Aleksandrovich Trifonov (Russian: Николай Александрович Трифонов; 23 February 1891 – 9 December 1958) was a Soviet chemist and founder of the Scientific School of Chemistry. His expertise primarily consisted of the physical and chemical analysis of concentrated solutions.

== Life ==
Nikolai Aleksandrovich Trifonov was born in Saint Petersburg into a family of government officials on February 23, 1891. In her youth, his mother, Alexandra Vasilievna, was the maid of honor for the Russian Empress.

He died in Kazan on 9 December 1958.

== Education ==
In 1909, Trifonov graduated from a secondary school in Novgorod, and soon after enrolled in the metallurgical department at St. Petersburg Polytechnic Institute. Trifonov continued his studies and research under Russian chemists Nikolai Kurnakov, Vladimir Kistyakovskii, Pavel Fedotov, Abram Ioffe, and Aleksandr Baykov.

== Career ==
Upon graduating from university in 1918, Trifonov was appointed by the Petrograd regional committee for the supply of the Red Army to oversee its laboratory. A year later, Trifonov undertook research at the department of inorganic and physical chemistry. Four years after, he was admitted as a member of the faculty in the physics department at Saratov University.

Trifonov was the head of the department of inorganic and physical chemistry as part of the medical faculty at Perm University from 1927 to 1932. Trifonov was invited in 1932 to work along with Viktor Ust-Kachkintsev and Roman Merzlin at the Institute of Chemical Defence.

Trifonov defended his doctoral dissertation, Physical and chemical analysis of binary liquid systems in the form of surface tension isotherms, in 1940 in Rostov-on-Don. Following this, in 1941, Trifonov became a Doctor of Chemical Sciences.

From 1939 to 1945, he was the head of the department of physical and colloid chemistry at Rostov State University, and from 1945 to 1948, he headed the department of physical and colloid chemistry of Kazan University. Concurrently with these positions, Trifonov led the physical chemistry department at the Kazan branch of the USSR Academy of Sciences.

== Conviction ==
In 1935, Trifonov was convicted of espionage and briefly imprisoned. Aleksandr Solzhenitsyn, who was a student at Rostov University from 1936 to 1941, described in his seminal work, The Gulag Archipelago, how the conviction impacted Trifonov's personality.

"In Rostov University, when I was still a student, there was Professor Nikolkay Trifonov, a strange professor: his head was constantly tucked into his shoulders, he was always strained, fearful, never responded when you called him out in a corridor. Later we learned: he had already been imprisoned—and every hail in the corridor could be from NKVD agents, he thought."
