= November 1916 (novel) =

1985 novel by Aleksandr Solzhenitsyn

November 1916 (Russian: Ноябрь шестнадцатого) is a novel by famed Russian author Aleksandr Solzhenitsyn. It is the sequel to August 1914, which concerned Russia's role in World War I. The novel picks up on the brink of the Russian Revolution, depicting characters from all walks of life — from soldiers and peasants to Tsar Nicholas II, Tsarina Alexandra Feodorovna, and Lenin. Unlike the first novel, the book does not revolve around any specific historical events. Instead, the book portrays everyday lives and politics as they were in the period between Imperial Russia's peak and the February Revolution.

The novel's original Russian title is Oktyabr Shestnadtsatogo — October 1916; during the period in which the novel is set, Russia had not yet adopted the Gregorian calendar, and so its dates were somewhat out of step with the rest of the world. (And the February Revolution, mentioned above, occurred in late February 1917 according to the calendar then in use, but early March according to the Gregorian calendar.)

In November 1916, the literary form of the novel is used as a device to link together what are best described as a series of essays and polemics. Solzhenitsyn uses long and detailed dialogues between characters to present political and philosophical arguments. Several of the fictional characters, especially those engaged in the dialogues, are very thinly disguised historical personages. The dialogue device explores many important controversies in pre-revolutionary Russia. Although Solzhenitysn himself is openly contemptuous of the leftist tendency in Russian political thought and public life in this period, he gives these views full airing along with others more in sympathy with his own views.

== See also ==
- The Red Wheel
