= Ignat Solzhenitsyn =

Russian-American conductor and pianist (born 1972)

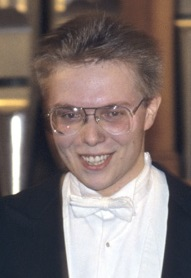
- Ignat Solzhenitsyn, 1993
- Born: 23 September 1972 (age 53); Moscow, Russian SFSR, Soviet Union
- Occupations: Composer, conductor, lecturer, pianist
- Children: 3
- Parent(s): Aleksandr Solzhenitsyn and Natalia Solzhenitsyna
- Website: www.ignatsolzhenitsyn.com

Ignat Aleksandrovich Solzhenitsyn (Russian: Игнат Александрович Солженицын; born September 23, 1972) is a Russian American conductor and pianist. He is the conductor laureate of the Chamber Orchestra of Philadelphia and the principal guest conductor of the Moscow Symphony Orchestra. He is the son of Russian author Aleksandr Solzhenitsyn.

== Early life and education ==
Ignat Solzhenitsyn was born in Moscow in 1972, the middle son of the author Aleksandr Solzhenitsyn who was 53 at the time of his birth. He began serious piano study in Marlboro, Vermont with Luis Batlle, and then in London with Maria Curcio, the last and favourite pupil of Artur Schnabel, and then with Gary Graffman at the Curtis Institute, where he also majored in conducting under Otto-Werner Mueller.

== Career ==
As conductor, Solzhenitsyn has led the symphonies of Baltimore, Buffalo, Dallas, Indianapolis, Nashville, New Jersey, North Carolina, Seattle, Toledo, and Toronto, the Nordwestdeutsche Philharmonie, as well as many of the major orchestras in Russia including the Mariinsky Orchestra, the St. Petersburg Philharmonic, the Moscow Philharmonic, the Moscow Symphony, and the Ural Philharmonic. He has partnered with such world-renowned soloists as Richard Goode, Gary Graffman, Steven Isserlis, Leila Josefowicz, Sylvia McNair, Garrick Ohlsson, Mstislav Rostropovich, and Mitsuko Uchida.

His extensive touring schedule in the United States and Europe has included concerto performances with numerous major orchestras, including those of Boston, Chicago, Philadelphia, St. Louis, Los Angeles, Seattle, Baltimore, Washington, Montreal, Toronto, London, Paris, St. Petersburg, Israel, and Sydney, and collaborations with such distinguished conductors as Herbert Blomstedt, James Conlon, James DePreist, Charles Dutoit, Lawrence Foster, Valery Gergiev, Krzysztof Penderecki, André Previn, Mstislav Rostropovich, Gerard Schwarz, Wolfgang Sawallisch, Jerzy Semkow, Maxim Shostakovich, Yuri Temirkanov, and David Zinman.

An avid chamber musician, Solzhenitsyn has collaborated with the Emerson, Borodin, Brentano, St. Petersburg and Lydian String Quartets, and in four-hand recital with Mitsuko Uchida. He has frequently appeared at international festivals, including Salzburg, Évian, Ludwigsburg, Caramoor, Ojai, Marlboro, Nizhny Novgorod, and Moscow's famed December Evenings.

A winner of the Avery Fisher Career Grant, Ignat Solzhenitsyn serves on the piano faculty of the Curtis Institute of Music. He has been featured on many radio and television specials, including CBS Sunday Morning and ABC's Nightline.

== Personal life ==
Solzhenitsyn resides in New York City with his wife and three children.
