= Yésica Sánchez Maya =

Mexican lawyer (born 1977)

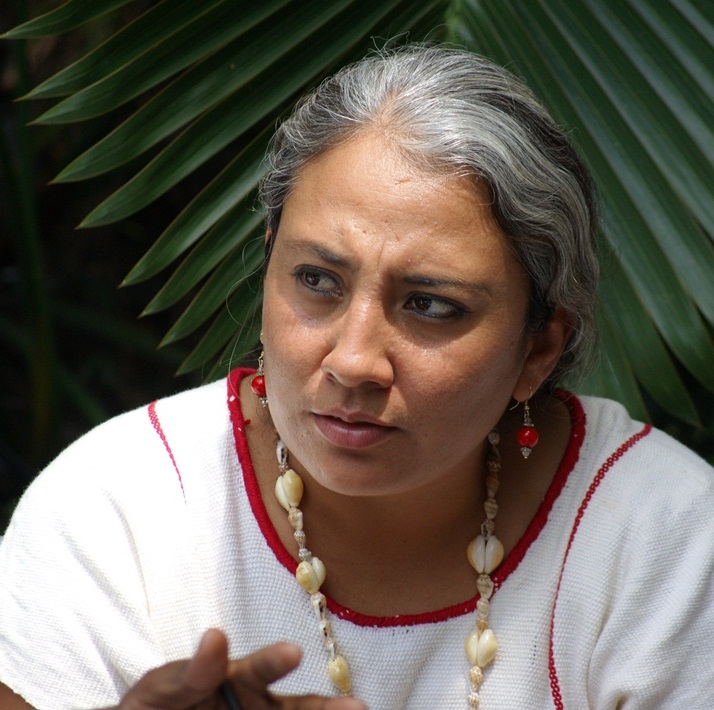
- Born: 13 November 1977 (age 47); Mexico City, Mexico
- Occupation(s): lawyer, feminist, human rights activist
- Years active: 1993-present

Yésica Sánchez Maya (born 13 November 1977 in Mexico City, Mexico) is a human rights attorney who works in Oaxaca, Mexico. In 2003, she began serving as president of the Mexican League for the Defense of Human Rights (LIMEDDH) in Oaxaca. In 2006, when a teacher's strike erupted in Oaxaca she was threatened for defending clients and an arrest warrant was issued when she spoke out about the violence and human rights abuses the state was engaging in. In 2008, she left LIMEDDH and founded the Consortium for Parliamentary Dialogue and Equality, for which she serves as deputy director, and works on a wide variety of issues including economic and politic inequality, femicide, education, and other human rights issues. She has testified at a hearing by the Inter-American Commission on Human Rights about violence against women in the region, sexual minorities, and indigenous women, including the Mixe and has attended hearings and presented reports to both the United Nations and the Organization of American States regarding forced disappearances, torture, and violence against women. In 2011, Sánchez Maya and other human rights activists were able to pressure Oaxacan legislators to pass Law for the Defense of Human Rights to limit state intimidation and protect citizen's rights. In 2012, she sought the office of state Ombudsman for the Defence of Human Rights of the People of Oaxaca (DDHPO) and had the support of NGOs and citizens, but the appointment went to Arturo Peimbert. Sánchez Maya has been vocal in criticism of the ombudsman for failure to implement the Victims Act and convene the Committee of Victims. In 2015, Sánchez Maya was advocating for laws to protect journalists and human rights defenders from threats and violence. She stated that this year, the number of incidents has risen markedly.
