= Anton Dumansky =

Soviet-Ukrainian chemist (1880–1967)

- Антон Думанський
- Born: 20 July 1880; Ivanovo, Vladimir Governorate, Russian Empire
- Died: 14 April 1967 (aged 86); Kyiv, Ukrainian Soviet Socialist Republic, Soviet Union
- Education: Kyiv Polytechnic Institute
- Known for: Colloidal chemistry
- Awards: Order of Lenin
- Scientific career
- Fields: Chemistry
- Workplaces: Kyiv Polytechnic Institute; Voronezh State University; Taras Shevchenko National University of Kyiv

Anton Vladimirovich Dumansky (Ukrainian: Антон Володимирович Думанськи; 20 June 1880 - 14 May 1967) was a Soviet-Ukrainian chemist who pioneered colloidal chemistry in the Soviet Union. He is best known for his early work on ultracentrifugation, which was later expanded by Theodor Svedberg, and for his studies on hydrophilic colloids, bound water in colloidal systems, and the general principles of lyophilization for colloids. For his works, he was awarded the Great Mendeleev Prize, two Order of Lenin, and the Red Banner of Labour.

After receiving his bachelor's in 1903 from the Kyiv Polytechnic Institute, Dumansky later graduated from Kyiv University in 1913 with a master's degree on colloidal solutions, receiving the title of professor. Afterwards, he worked at the Voronezh Agricultural Institute and later the Voronezh Institute of Chemical Technology after they were newly founded, and in 1932 became the inaugural head of the State Research Institute of Colloid Chemistry of the USSR. In 1935, he helped found the "Colloid Journal", which he became an editor of. After working within the Kazakh SSR and later the Ministry of Food Industry during World War II, he moved back to Kyiv in 1945 and became the Director of the Institute of General and Inorganic Chemistry of the Academy of Sciences of the Ukrainian SSR. He worked within the institute until his death in 1967, and also briefly served as a professor from 1946 to 1952 at Kyiv University and the Kyiv Technological Institute of the Food Industry.

== Early life ==
Dumansky was born on 20 June 1880 in the village of Ivanovo, which was then part of the Vladimir Governorate in the Russian Empire. The Dumansky family were originally from Transcarpathia, with Anton himself calling his origins "Rusyn" in private conversations. However, the family had fled the region during its Austro-Hungarian rule due to the increase in Magyarization, where the family then settled in Ivanovo. His father was a teacher in a gymnasium, and in 1898 he graduated from the real school there in Ivanovo. He then attended the Chemical-Technological Faculty of the Kyiv Polytechnic Institute, graduating in 1903 with the diploma work called "Colloidal Silver". He became interested in the topic due to attending the "Chemical Circle" led by M. I. Konovalov, who had proposed topics on colloidal solutions, and at first published a scientific article regarding the chemistry of colloidal silver in the Bulletin of the Kyiv Polytechnic Institute before expanding on this in his graduation diploma. Dmitri Mendeleev, a famous chemist who was present at the graduation exams, stated that his diploma promised a lot in the future for the Motherland.

== Career ==
After graduating, Dumansky remained at the Kyiv Polytechnic Institute as a laboratory assistant, and then later on became an assistant in the Department of Inorganic Chemistry, organising a lab regarding colloid chemistry there, where he conducted studies on the colloidal state of substances in media. He also briefly trained abroad, working in the laboratory of Herbert Freundlich in Leipzig, studying the influence of colloids on the electrical conductivity of electrolytes and how electrolytes diffuse in sols and gelatin gels. In 1907, he reported on the results of his study on the effect of colloids on the electrical conductivity of electrolytes at the first Mendeleev Congress in St. Petersburg. He then proposed a new way of understanding gels, calling gels a spatial network and the structural elements are non-conductive and between the elements lies the dispersion medium. He also invented practical methods to study sols by introducing the collodion membrane for laboratory use, being the first to apply centrifugation to measure colloidal particle size in order to analyse dispersity, a process known as ultracentrifugation. The centrifugation method was further developed by Theodor Svedberg and J.B. Nichols, who constructed the first centrifuge with an optical system in 1923. Svedberg later noted the decrease in absorbance at the top of the cell during centrifugation and made the first measurements of protein molecular weights by sedimentation equilibrium. In 1926, Svedberg was awarded the Nobel Prize in Chemistry, with ultracentrifugation being cited as a major reason he won the award.

Eventually, Dumansky returned to the Russian Empire in 1912 to deliver lectures on colloid chemistry at Kyiv University. In 1913, he defended his master's thesis on colloidal solutions, which was the first master's thesis on colloids in Russia, thus receiving the title of professor. His master's thesis and later works were later used as a framework for colloidal solutions in textbooks. After defending his thesis, he was invited to, in that same year, be the inaugural head of the Department of Inorganic Chemistry at the newly established Voronezh Agricultural Institute. During these years, in the 1920s, most of his work focused on the synthesis and study of the properties of various inorganic materials, and he also developed what he called the method of polyatomic oxycompounds to synthesize hydrosols. In addition, he introduced a graphical method using triangular diagrams to represent systems with dispersed phase, dispersion medium, and a stabilizer to analyze colloidal systems. In 1930, he became the Head of the Department of Physical and Colloid Chemistry at the Voronezh Institute of Chemical Technology after it was newly formed as a split off form the Voronezh Agricultural Institute. By decree of the Council of People's Commissars of the RSFSR in May 1932 the State Research Institute of Colloid Chemistry was founded, which Dumansky was appointed as director of in addition to his teaching position. The following year, in 1933, he was elected a corresponding member of the Academy of Sciences of the USSR. Early efforts of the institute led by Dumansky focused on bound water and the properties of hydrophilic colloids.

By 1935, in part due to the effort of Dumansky, the "Colloid Journal" was founded which he became an editor of. During the start of World War II, in 1941, Voronezh became occupied by German troops, which led Dumansky to eventually creating a method for producing combustible liquids for anti-tank weapons from the products of synthetic rubber production in order to help with the resistance. However, he soon after left the city during its occupation, and went to Almaty to head the Department of Physical and Colloid Chemistry at the Kazakh University. He again moved institutes in 1943 to head the colloid-chemistry lab of the All-Union Scientific Research Institute of the Baking Industry under the Ministry of Food Industry of the USSR, during which time most of his work was dedicated colloidal-chemical phenomena in baking. Two years later, he was invited to be the Director of the Institute of General and Inorganic Chemistry of the Academy of Sciences of the Ukrainian SSR. His main focus during this time was on rebuilding the institute after it suffered heavy wartime destruction World War II, and his research was in thermochemical and adsorption studies of hydrophilic colloids. He also established how colloids could be freeze-dried, or lyophilized, and invented precise methods to measure the bound water that gave these systems unique properties. He was also part-time from 1946 to 1952 the Head of the Department of Colloid Chemistry at Kyiv University and at the Kyiv Technological Institute of the Food Industry. He stayed in this position until 1960, when he became Head of Laboratory, and then in 1965 he became a Senior Research Fellow there which he served as until his death. Dumansky died on 14 May 1967 at the age of 87 in Kyiv, where he had been working.

== Awards and honours ==
His name was given to the Institute of Colloid Chemistry and Water Chemistry of the Academy of Sciences of Ukraine. In addition, he was awarded the following honours:

- 1932 - Great Mendeleev Prize (awarded by the Academy of Sciences of the USSR)
- Honored Scientist of the Ukrainian SSR
- Honored Worker of Science and Technology of the Kazakh SSR
- Order of Lenin (twice)
- Red Banner of Labour
