= The Gulag Archipelago =

1973 non-fiction book by Aleksandr Solzhenitsyn

The Gulag Archipelago: An Experiment in Literary Investigation
- Author: Aleksandr Solzhenitsyn
- Original title: Архипелаг ГУЛАГ
- Translator: Geneviève Johannet, José Johannet, Nikita Struve (French); Thomas P. Whitney (English); Tian Dawei (Chinese); Francisco Augusto Ferreira, Maria Llistó, and José Augusto Seabra (Portuguese)
- Language: Russian
- Publisher: YMCA Press
- Publication date: 1973
- Publication place: France
- English publication date: 1974
- Media type: Print (hardback and paperback)
- ISBN: 0-06-013914-5
- OCLC: 802879
- Dewey Decimal: 365/.45/0947
- LC Class: HV9713 .S6413 1974

The Gulag Archipelago: An Experiment in Literary Investigation (Russian: Архипелаг ГУЛАГ, romanized: Arkhipelag GULAG) is a three-volume nonfiction series written between 1958 and 1968 by Russian writer Aleksandr Solzhenitsyn, a Soviet dissident. It was first published in Russian in 1973 by the Parisian publisher YMCA-Press, and it was translated into English and French the following year. It explores a vision of life in what is often known as the Gulag, (Note: In Russian, the term GULAG (ГУЛАГ) is an acronym for Main Directorate of Camps (Главное управление лагерей) the Soviet labour camp system. Solzhenitsyn constructed his highly detailed narrative from various sources including reports, interviews, statements, diaries, legal documents, and his own experience as a Gulag prisoner.

Following its publication, the book was initially circulated in the Soviet Union by samizdat underground publication. It was not widely published there until 1989. It appeared that year in the literary journal Novy Mir; a third of the work was published in three issues. Since the dissolution of the Soviet Union, The Gulag Archipelago has been officially published in Russia.

== Structure ==
As structured in most printed editions, the text comprises seven sections divided into three volumes: parts 1 and 2, parts 3 and 4, and parts 5 to 7. At one level, the Gulag Archipelago traces the history of the system of forced labor camps that operated in the Soviet Union from 1918 to 1956. Solzhenitsyn begins with Vladimir Lenin's original decrees that were made shortly after the October Revolution; they established the legal and practical framework for a series of camps where political prisoners and ordinary criminals would be sentenced to forced labor. (Note: A similar (but on vastly smaller scale) network of forced labour camps, known as katorga, existed in the Russian Empire since the early 18th century. It was abolished by the Russian Provisional Government in 1917.)

The book describes and discusses the waves of purges and the assembling of show trials by Stalin through the 1930s in the context of the development of the greater Gulag system; Solzhenitsyn closely examines its purposive legal and bureaucratic development. The narrative ends in 1956 at the time of Nikita Khrushchev's Secret Speech ("On the Personality Cult and its Consequences"). Khrushchev gave the speech at the 20th Congress of the Communist Party of the Soviet Union, denouncing Joseph Stalin's personality cult, his autocratic power, and the widespread surveillance of all classes of people that pervaded the Stalin era.

Parallel to this historical and legal narrative, Solzhenitsyn follows the typical course of a zek through the Gulag. This was a slang term for an inmate, derived from the widely used abbreviation z/k for zakliuchenny ("prisoner"). He started with arrest, show trial, and initial internment, continuing with the transport to the Gulag. In that setting, he explored the treatment of prisoners and their general living conditions, slave labor gangs and the technical prison camp system, camp rebellions and strikes, such as the Kengir uprising; the practice of continued internal exile following the completion of the original prison sentence, and the ultimate but not guaranteed release of the prisoner, if one survived. Solzhenitsyn's examination details the trivial and commonplace events of an average prisoner's life, as well as specific and noteworthy events during the history of the Gulag system, including revolts and uprisings.

== Thesis ==
In Chapter 4, Solzhenitsyn writes: "Macbeth’s self-justifications were feeble – and his conscience devoured him. Yes, even Iago was a little lamb, too. The imagination and spiritual strength of Shakespeare's evildoers stopped short at a dozen corpses. Because they had no ideology. Ideology – that is what gives evildoing its long-sought justification and gives the evildoer the necessary steadfastness and determination. That is the social theory which helps to make his acts seem good instead of bad in his own and others' eyes.... That was how the agents of the Inquisition fortified their wills: by invoking Christianity; the conquerors of foreign lands, by extolling the grandeur of their Motherland; the colonizers, by civilization; the Nazis, by race; and the Jacobins (early and late), by equality, brotherhood, and the happiness of future generations... Without evildoers there would have been no Archipelago."

Solzhenitsyn painstakingly laid the theoretical, legal, and practical origins of the Gulag system at Lenin's feet, not Stalin's. According to Solzhenitsyn's testimony, Stalin amplified a concentration camp system that was already in place and this was significant because he said many Western intellectuals considered the Soviet prison camp system to be a Stalinist aberration.

Solzhenitsyn claims that although many practices had been stopped, the basic structure of the system had survived and it could be revived and expanded by future leaders. While Khrushchev, the Communist Party, and the Soviet Union's supporters in the West viewed the Gulag as a deviation of Stalin, Solzhenitsyn and others among the opposition tended to view it as a systemic fault of Soviet political culture, and an inevitable outcome of the Bolshevik political project.

== Publication ==
After the KGB had confiscated Solzhenitsyn's materials in Moscow, during 1965–1967, he worked to develop his preparatory drafts of The Gulag Archipelago into finished typescript. He accomplished some of this while in hiding at his friends' homes in the Moscow region and elsewhere.

While held at the KGB's Lubyanka Prison in 1945, Solzhenitsyn had befriended Arnold Susi, a lawyer and former Estonian Minister of Education, who had been taken captive after the Soviet Union occupied Estonia in 1944. Solzhenitsyn entrusted Susi with the original typed and proofread manuscript of the finished work, after copies had been made of it both on paper and on microfilm. Susi got the manuscript to his daughter, Heli Susi, who kept the "master copy" hidden from the KGB in Estonia until the dissolution of the Soviet Union in 1991.

In 1973, the KGB seized one of only three existing copies of the text still on Soviet soil. This was achieved by interrogating Elizaveta Voronyanskaya, one of Solzhenitsyn's trusted typists who knew where the typed copy was hidden. Within days of her release by the KGB she was found hanged in the stairwell of her apartment on the 3rd of August 1973. She had apparently either hanged herself or been murdered. Solzhenitsyn had wanted the manuscript to be first published in Russia, but knew this was impossible under conditions then extant. After Solzhenitsyn learned of Voronyanskaya's death he decided to allow its publication in Paris. The first edition of the work was published in Russian by the Parisian publishing house YMCA-Press (founded by Russian immigrants) a few days after Christmas 1973. They had received a go-ahead from Solzhenitsyn but had decided to release the work about ten days earlier than he had expected. News of the nature of the work immediately caused a stir, and translations into many other languages followed within the next few months, sometimes produced in a race against time. American Thomas P. Whitney produced the English version. The English and French translations of Volume I appeared in the spring and summer of 1974.

The work had a profound effect internationally. Not only did it provoke energetic debate in the West; a mere six weeks after the work had left Parisian presses Solzhenitsyn himself was forced into exile. Because possession of the manuscript incurred the risk of a long prison sentence for "anti-Soviet activities", Solzhenitsyn never worked on the manuscript in complete form. Since he was under constant KGB surveillance, Solzhenitsyn worked on only parts of the manuscript at any one time, so as not to put the full book into jeopardy if he happened to be arrested.

For this reason, he secreted the various parts of the work throughout Moscow and the surrounding suburbs, in the care of trusted friends. Sometimes when he was purportedly visiting them on social calls he actually worked on the manuscript in their homes. During much of this time, Solzhenitsyn lived at the dacha of the world-famous cellist Mstislav Rostropovich, and due to the reputation and standing of the musician, despite the elevated scrutiny of the Soviet authorities, Solzhenitsyn was reasonably safe from KGB searches there.

With the possible exception of One Day in the Life of Ivan Denisovich, it is his best-known and most popular work, at least in the West. Finished in 1968, The Gulag Archipelago was microfilmed and smuggled out to Solzhenitsyn's main legal representative, Fritz Heeb of Zürich, to await publication; a later paper copy, also smuggled out, was signed by Heinrich Böll at the foot of each page to prove against possible accusations of a falsified work. Solzhenitsyn was aware that there was a wealth of material and perspectives about Gulag to be continued in the future, but he considered the book finished for his part. The royalties and sales income for the book were transferred to the Solzhenitsyn Aid Fund for aid to former camp prisoners. His fund, (The Russian Social Fund), which had to work in secret in its native country, managed to transfer substantial amounts of money towards helping former gulag prisoners in the 1970s and 1980s.

== Reception and impact ==
Beginning in 2009, Russian schools issued the book as required reading. Russian president Vladimir Putin called the book "much-needed", while the Russian Ministry of Education said that the book showed "vital historical and cultural heritage on the course of 20th-century domestic history." Arseny Roginsky, the then head of the human-rights organization Memorial, welcomed Putin's backing for the Solzhenitsyn textbook. Solzhenitsyn's widow created the abridged version for Russian high-school students, including an introduction about the nature of Solzhenitsyn's "experiment in literary investigation."

The author's first wife Natalya Reshetovskaya described her ex-husband's book as "folklore", telling a newspaper in 1974 that she felt the book was "not in fact the life of the country and not even the life of the camps but the folklore of the camps." In her 1974 memoir, Reshetovskaya wrote that Solzhenitsyn did not consider the book to be "historical research, or scientific research", and stated that the significance of the book had been "overestimated and wrongly appraised." Her books were published by the Novosti Press, a state-run media founded by the USSR Council of People's Commissars and the Communist Party Central Committee. Her editor there was Konstantin Semyonov, and he became her third husband.

=== Academic ===
Historian and archival researcher Stephen G. Wheatcroft described the book as "a fine literary masterpiece, a sharp political indictment against the Soviet regime, and has had tremendous importance in raising the issue of Soviet repression in the Russian consciousness." Wheatcroft wrote that the book was essentially a "literary and political work", and "never claimed to place the camps in a historical or social-scientific quantitative perspective" but that in the case of qualitative estimates, Solzhenitsyn gave his inaccurately high estimate as he wanted to challenge the Soviet authorities to show that "the scale of the camps was less than this." Wheatcroft stated that historians relied on Solzhenitsyn to support their estimates of deaths under Stalin in the tens of millions but research in the state archives vindicated the lower estimates, while adding that the popular press has continued to include serious errors that should not be cited, or relied on, in academia."

UCLA historian J. Arch Getty wrote of Solzhenitsyn's methodology that "such documentation is methodologically unacceptable in other fields of history" and that "the work is of limited value to the serious student of the 1930s for it provides no important new information or original analytical framework. Gabor Rittersporn shared Getty's criticism, saying that "he is inclined to give priority to vague reminiscences and hearsay ... [and] inevitably [leads] towards selective bias", adding that "one might dwell at length on the inaccuracies discernible in Solzhenitsyn’s work". Vadim Rogovin writes of the eyewitness accounts that Solzhenitsyn had read, saying he "took plenty of license in outlining their contents and interpreting them". Both Rogovin and Walter Laquer argue that the book belongs to the genre of 'oral history'.

In an interview with the German weekly newspaper Die Zeit, British historian Orlando Figes stated that many Gulag inmates he interviewed for his research identified so strongly with the book's contents that they became unable to distinguish between their own experiences and what they read: "The Gulag Archipelago spoke for a whole nation and was the voice of all those who suffered." Soviet dissident and historian Roy Medvedev referred to the book as "extremely contradictory". In a review for the book, Medvedev described it as without parallel for its impact, saying: "I believe there are few who will get up from their desks after reading this book the same as when they opened its first page. In this regard I have nothing with which to compare Solzhenitsyn's book either in Russian or world literature." In the same review, he also writes that "This book is full of thoughts and observations, some profound and true, others perhaps not always true but born in the monstrous sufferings of tens of millions of persons."

=== Popular press ===
Novelist Doris Lessing said that the book "brought down an empire", while author Michael Scammell described the book as a gesture that "amounted to a head-on challenge to the Soviet state, calling its very legitimacy into question and demanding revolutionary change." About its impact, philosopher Isaiah Berlin wrote: "Until the Gulag, the Communists and their allies had persuaded their followers that denunciations of the regime were largely bourgeois propaganda." United States diplomat George F. Kennan said that the book was "the most powerful single indictment of a political regime ever to be levied in modern times."

Author Tom Butler-Bowdon has described the book as a "Solzhenitsyn's monument to the millions tortured and murdered in Soviet Russia between the Bolshevik Revolution and the 1950s." An edition of The Book Show said that the book helped expose the brutality of the Soviet system. Psychologist Jordan Peterson, who wrote the foreword of an abridged fiftieth anniversary edition released on 1 November 2018, described The Gulag Archipelago as the most important book of the twentieth century.

Parallels have been drawn between the book and the treatment of Liao Yiwu, a dissident who is dubbed "the Chinese Solzhenitsyn" according to the Agence France-Presse. Author David Aikman stated that Liao is the first Chinese dissident writer to "come up with a very detailed account of prison conditions including torture in China in the same way that [Soviet dissident Aleksandr] Solzhenitsyn did in The Gulag Archipelago."

== Television documentary ==
In December 2009, the Russian channel Rossiya K showed the French television documentary L'Histoire Secrète de l'Archipel du Goulag made by Jean Crépu and Nicolas Miletitch, and translated it into Russian under the title Taynaya Istoriya "Arkhipelaga GULAG" (Secret History: The Gulag Archipelago). The documentary covers events related to the writing and publication of The Gulag Archipelago.

== See also ==
- Art and culture in the Gulag labor camps
- Article 58 (RSFSR Penal Code)
- The Black Book of Communism
- Black site
- Crimes against humanity under communist regimes
- Criticism of communist party rule
- Human rights in the Soviet Union
- Le Monde's 100 Books of the Century
- Julius Margolin
- Mass killings under communist regimes
- Nikolai Trifonov
- The Stalinist Legacy
