= Natalia Solzhenitsyna =

Russian philanthropist (born 1939)

- Наталья Солженицына
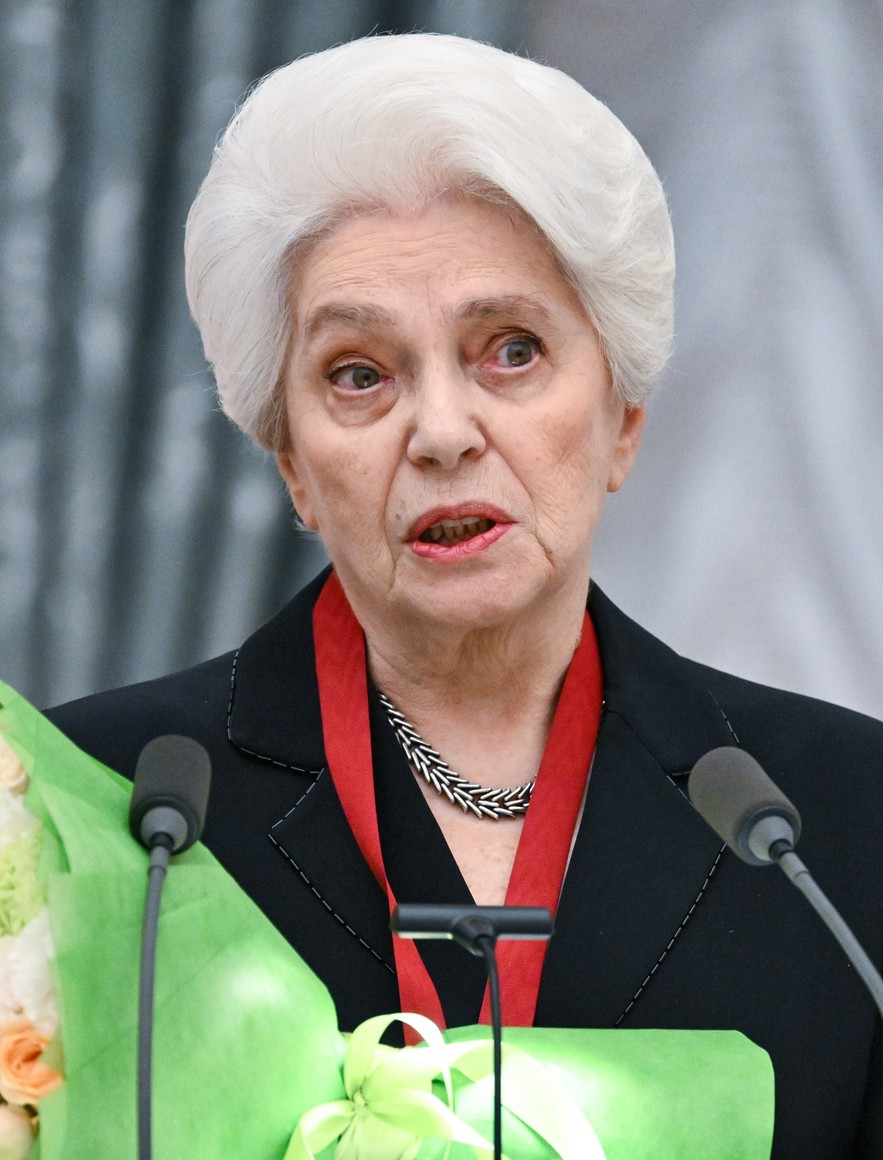
- Solzhenitsyna in 2025
- Born: Natalia Dmitrievna Svetlova; 22 July 1939 (age 87); Moscow, Soviet Union
- Citizenship: Soviet (1939–1976, 1990-1991); Russian (1991–present)
- Education: Moscow State University
- Occupations: Philanthropist, mathematician
- Known for: President of the Solzhenitsyn Aid Fund
- Spouse(s): Andrey Turin (1960s) Aleksandr Solzhenitsyn (m. 1973; died 2008)
- Children: 4, including Ignat
- Awards: Order "For Merit to the Fatherland", 3rd, 4th class Order of Saint Catherine the Great Martyr; Yasnaya Polyana Literary Award

Natalia Dmitrievna Solzhenitsyna (née Svetlova, Russian: Наталия Дмитриевна Солженицына née Светлова; born 22 July 1939) is a Russian philanthropist, former Soviet mathematician, and the widow of Nobel Prize-winning author Aleksandr Solzhenitsyn. She currently serves as president of the Solzhenitsyn Aid Fund, which was founded in 1974 by her late husband and dissident journalist Alexander Ginzburg.

== Biography ==
Natalia Svetlova was born in Moscow in 1939. Her father, Dmitry Velikorodny, a graduate of the Institute of Red Professors, went missing in action two years later during the Battle of Vyazma–Bryansk. Her mother, Yekaterina Svetlova, was a graduate of the Moscow Aviation Institute. Natalia's maternal grandfather, Ferdinand Svetlov, a member of the Socialist Revolutionary Party who worked for the Izvestia newspaper, was arrested a year and a half before her birth and was sent to the Gulag.

In 1962, Natalia graduated from the MSU Faculty of Mechanics and Mathematics and later worked in the mathematical statistics laboratory led by the renowned mathematician Andrey Kolmogorov.

In 1968, she met Aleksandr Solzhenitsyn, becoming his personal assistant, editor, and secretary. The couple had three sons together, Yermolai (born 1970), Ignat (born 1972), and Stepan (born 1973), before marrying officially in 1973.

Natalia left the Soviet Union with her mother and four sons following her husband's exile. Her Soviet citizenship was revoked by a decree of the Presidium of the Supreme Soviet of the Soviet Union in October 1976. It was later restored by a decree of the president of the Soviet Union in August 1990.

The Solzhenitsyns returned to Russia in 1994.

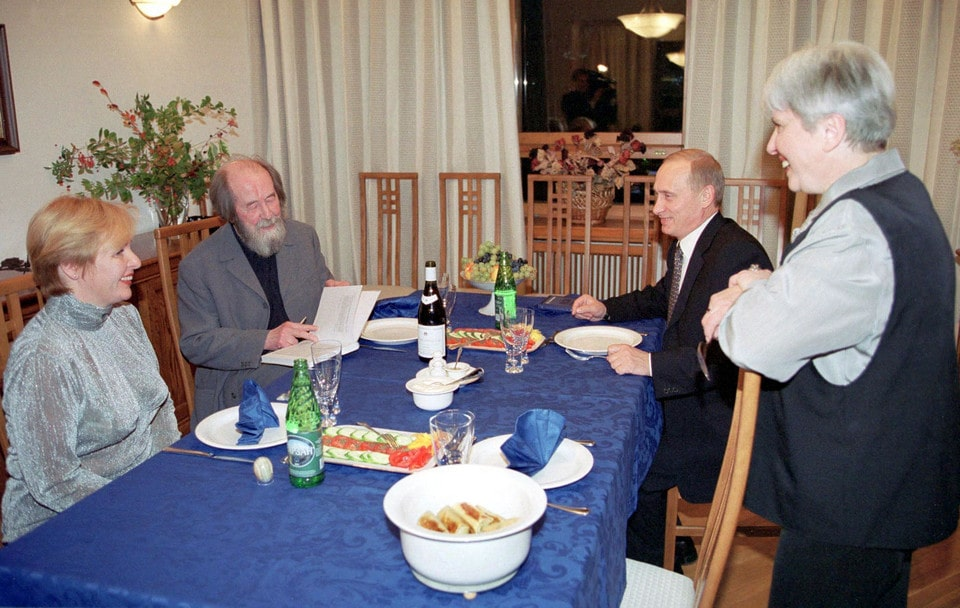
Natalia and Aleksandr Solzhenitsyn welcoming Vladimir Putin and his wife Lyudmila at their dacha in west Moscow, September 2000

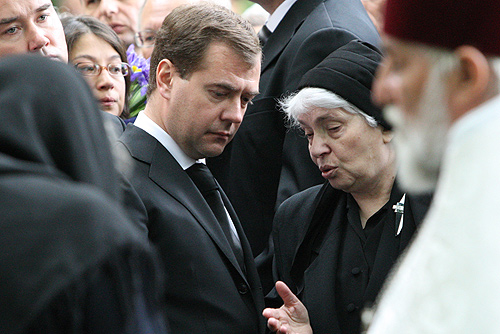
Solzhenitsyna with Dmitry Medvedev at her husband's funeral, August 2008

After her husband's death in 2008, Natalia Solzhenitsyna became the primary custodian and executor of his literary, historical, and documentary legacy.

She has publicly supported the Russian annexation of Crimea and called for dialogue with the incumbent authorities to avoid what she termed a "new disastrous confrontation", drawing parallels to the events of 1917. She has been awarded several medals by Putin, including the 2024 Order for Merit to the Fatherland.

== Awards ==
- Yasnaya Polyana Literary Award (2025)
- Order "For Merit to the Fatherland"
  - 3rd class (2024)
  - 4th class (2015)
- Order of Saint Catherine the Great Martyr (2019)
