= Order of Saint Catherine the Great Martyr =

Russian state decoration

Order of Saint Catherine
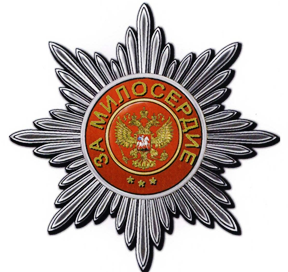
- Star of the Order of Saint Catherine
- Type: Single-grade order
- Awarded for: High moral values and compassion for their outstanding contribution to peacekeeping, charity, humanitarian activities and the preservation of cultural heritage.
- Presented by: Russian Federation
- Eligibility: Russian and foreign nationals
- Status: Active
- Established: 3 May 2012
- Sash and badge of the order

Precedence
- Next (higher): Order For Merit to the Fatherland 4th class
- Next (lower): Order of Alexander Nevsky

The Order of St. Catherine the Great Martyr (Russian: Орден Святой великомученицы Екатерины), is a State decoration of Russia established on 3 May 2012. President Dmitry Medvedev issued a presidential decree establishing an Order of St. Catherine to honour Russians and foreigners for outstanding contributions toward peacekeeping, charity, humanitarian efforts, and the preservation of cultural heritage.

== Recipients ==
- (Russia) Abbess Nikolai (3 May 2012)
- (Russia) Nina Perekhozhikh (3 May 2012)
- (Liechtenstein) Eduard von Falz-Fein (30 September 2012)
- (Russia) Natalia Sarganova (11 February 2012)
- (Russia) Naina Yeltsina (14 March 2017)
- (Russia) Natalia Solzhenitsyna (17 July 2019)
- (Russia) Abbess Varvara (3 March 2022)
- (Ukraine) Alla Potapova
