= Yurii Matros =

Yurii Sh. Matros
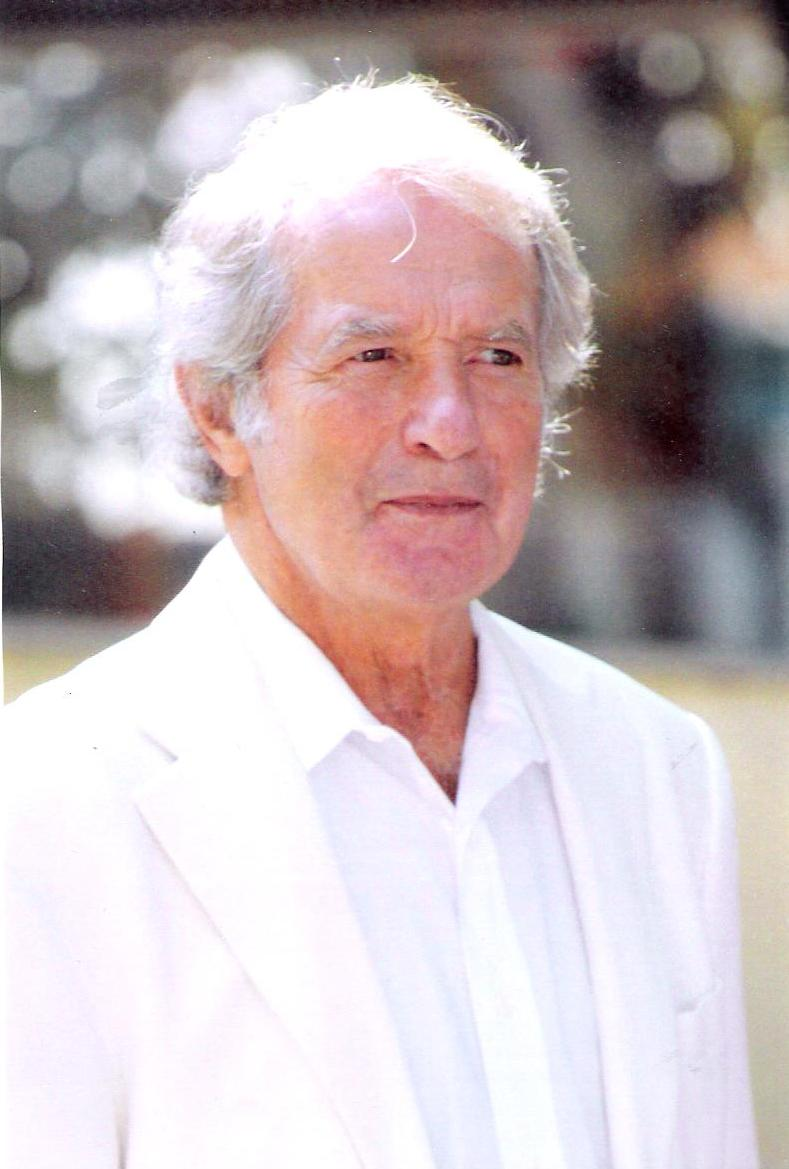
- Yu Matros
- Born: September 16, 1937; Odesa, Ukraine
- Died: July 21, 2020 (aged 82); Boca Raton, Florida, U.S.

Yurii Shaevich Matros (Юрий Шаевич Матрос; September 16, 1937 – July 21, 2020) was a Soviet and American scientist in the field of chemical engineering, known for his achievement in the theory and practice of heterogeneous catalytic processes. He is acknowledged as a “Godfather” of realization of catalytic processes in forced unsteady state conditions. Matros developed a catalytic reactor with periodic changes of direction of flow rate in packed bed of catalyst (named in literature as “reverse process” or “Matros Reactor”). This reactor is widely known in scientific and applied literature as an example of an application of developed theory of forced unsteady processes. Yurii Matros possessed a full doctoral degree of science and was a professor.

== Life and career ==
Matros was born in Odesa, Ukraine in 1937. As an overachieving student, he graduated from Odesa National Polytechnic University in 1959 with a red diploma (highest academic distinction). After four years of research at this university, while simultaneously working at the Novosibirsk chemical plant, he received his PhD degree in 1964. His science career was developed at the Boreskov Institute of Catalysis in its world-famous science center in the academic city of Novosibirsk (Akademgorodok), where in 1974 he received the degree of full doctor of chemical engineering and the official academic title of professor. Afterwards he became the head of the department which studied unsteady state processes in catalysis.

His more than thirty years of academic and applied research has been focused on the gas-solid fixed and fluidized bed reactors. In the 1960s and 1970s, he analyzed various levels of mathematical modeling of catalytic reactors, beginning with the reaction process over the catalyst surface and ending with the processes in catalyst pellet and catalytic reactor itself. As one of the first researchers in the field, he described non-standard patterns of fixed bed reactor behavior, such as wrong way behavior and multiplicity of steady-state solutions. He contributed greatly to the theory of formation and movement of creeping fronts through the packed bed.

His main scientific results, however, were developed from the 1970s to 1995. These results showed a new direction in theory and practice of forced unsteady-state processes in heterogeneous catalytic reactors as a way to significantly increase the efficiency of catalytic processes as a whole. Matros faced criticism by his opponents who claimed that he wants to construct a "perpetuum mobile". In reality, however, his theory was proven to be true, and now most chemical engineering science teams of universities and industry use it. The most frequently encountered example of unsteady-state operation is the reverse flow system (Matros reactor) in which the flow through reactor with fixed bed of catalysts is periodically reversed in order to store heat and/or mass, to regenerate heat/catalysts in situ, or to avoid kinetic limitation of a system at equilibrium.

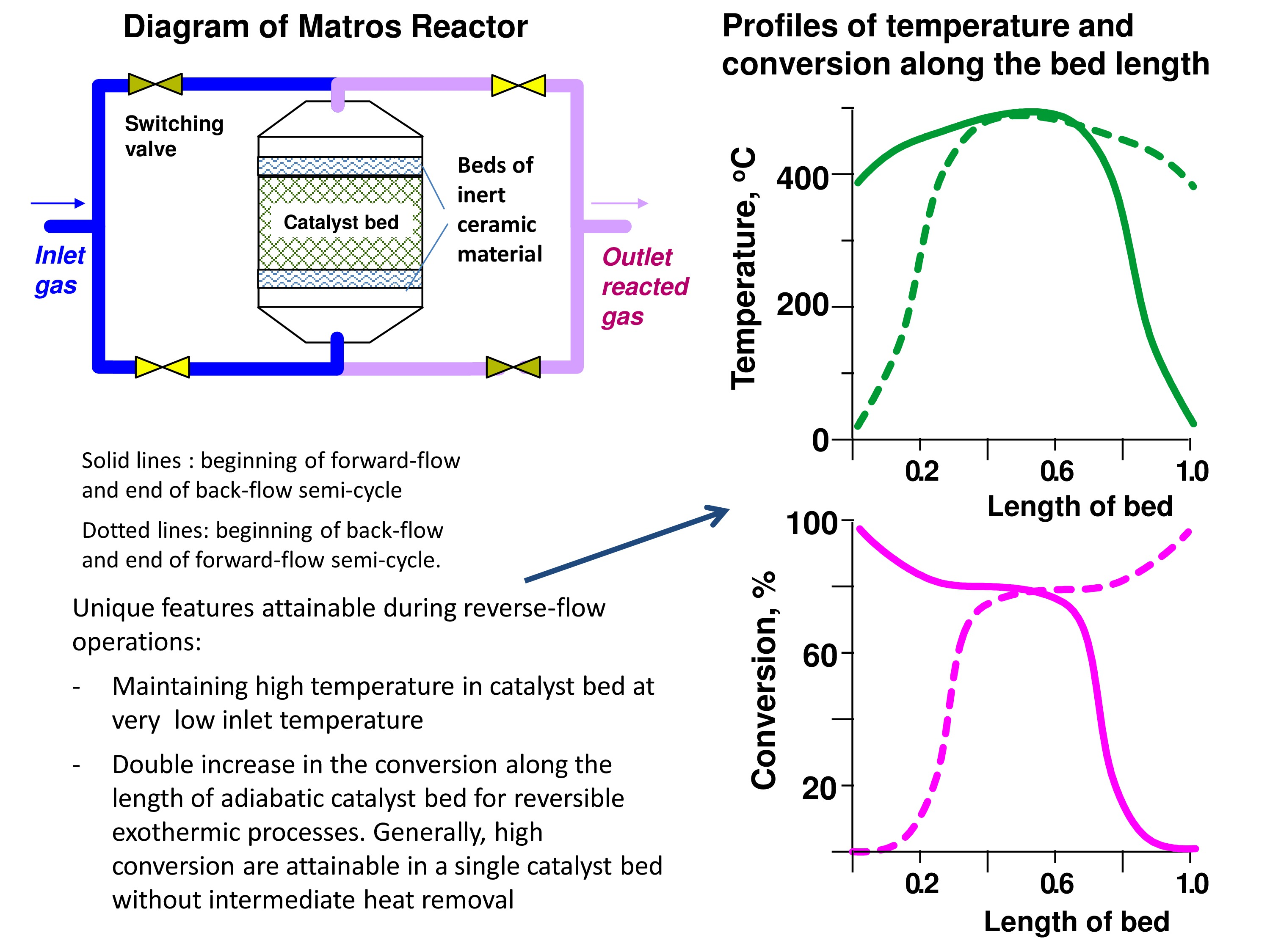

Former president of the Siberian Branch of Academy of Sciences of USSR (1925–2013) (now Russian Academy of Sciences), Gury Marchuk remarked that this was the most influential idea in chemistry during last 50 years.

Matros is one of the scientists of the Academy of Sciences who consistently brought his scientific achievements directly to industrial practice. His more than forty patents indicate his great interest in realizing, and he realized, his scientific basic knowledge in different industrial applications. Most of the current commercial applications are encountered in environmental cleanup, especially in the catalytic elimination of VOCs from industrial and commercial exhausts, SO_{2} oxidation in sulfuric acid production, NOx reduction. Matros has been directly involved in the development, design and startup of dozens of industrial units. Potential applications include a number of partial oxidation processes and treatment of vehicular exhaust.

Matros died in Boca Raton, Florida on July 21, 2020, at the age of 82.

== Scientific achievements ==
His achievements have become the basis for a scientific school, which focuses on unsteady state processes in catalysis and which attracts post graduate students and collaboration among scientists from the former Soviet Union and other countries, such as Bulgaria, Hungary, India, Belgium, France, Switzerland, Poland, Germany, China, Italy and the United States. His books were published in Russian, English and Chinese, and they have now become reference books in most chemical engineering university departments across the world. Matros is the organizer and chairman of the traditional International Conference of Unsteady State Process in Catalysis which takes place periodically in Russia, Canada, Japan or the United States, every 3 to 4 years on average. Matros is often invited to give plenary lectures (PL) at prestigious international conferences. There are only two examples: 1. XIX International Conference on Chemical Reactors CHEMREACTOR-19, September 5–9, 2010, Vienna, Austria; PL by Matros was "How to Design Optimal Catalytic Reactor." The lecture was dedicated to Professor Mikhail Slin'ko. 2. International Conference took place in Novosibirsk, Russia in June 2007. It was dedicated to the 100-year anniversary of academician Boreskov's birthday. The PL was about a new type of catalytic processes based on forced unsteady state conditions, was presented by Matros. It was written: “An excellent lecture delivered by Prof. J. Matros, ... to create a fundamentally new type of catalytic processes based on non-stationary mode. ... The lecture was summarized the application of this technology in the industry around the world over the last several decades.”

Matros’ role in international conferences reflects recognition in this field of science. In 1992, as a famous scientist, Matros received a green card on the basis of recommendations given by about 25 world authorities in chemical engineering: James Wei (dean, Pomeroy and Betty Perry Smith Professor, school of engineering and applied science, Princeton, NJ, US); Larry D. Schmidt (professor, University of Minnesota, Minneapolis, MN, US); W. Harmon Ray (Steenbock Professor of Engineering, University of Wisconsin, Madison, WI, US); Dan Luss (Cullen Professor and chairman, University of Houston, TX, US); Gilbert F. Froment (Directeur: professor, Dr. Ir., Universiteit Gent, België); Gerhart Eigenberger (professor. Dr. Ing., Universitat Stuttgart, head of Institut f. Chemische Verfahrenstechnik, Germany); Dr. Blumenberg, BASF (vice president, process chemistry, Ludwigshafen, Germany); professor, Dr. Ir. von Dierendock (senior research fellow, prof. of RUG, DSM; Dr. Jan J. Lerou (Du Pont, Wilmington, Delaware, director of research) and others. All of them reflected their own experience of scientific collaboration with Y. Matros.

One example of a recommendation includes the following fragment from BASF, on April 27, 1992: “He is one of the most famous chemical engineers, who are concerned with reactor technology ... BASF as one of the largest and most experienced chemical companies worldwide has acknowledged this by inviting Prof. Matros as a speaker on the occasion of its 125th anniversary in 1990 ... Prof. Matros has, besides his excellent research work, emphasized sharing of his knowledge with the scientific community. Excellent textbooks and numerous publications have contributed to the spread of scientific progress around the world.” Another example of a recommendation includes the following fragment from the Head of Institute of Chemishe Verfahrenstechick of the University Stuttgart, Prof. Gerhat Eigenberger from April 23, 1992: “This letter attests to academic and experimental credentials of Dr. Y. Sh. Matros ... Dr. Matros is director on leave of the Department of Unsteady State Catalysis Processes in Novosibirsk, Russia. The institute of Catalysis is the best known and the highly respected institution on Catalysis in the whole former Soviet Union, and Dr. Matros is certainly one of its internationally best known researchers and representatives. Among his many achievements in the field of catalytic reaction engineering, I consider as highest his contributions to the dynamic operation of fixed bed reactors with periodic flow reversal, which is now referred to as the «Matros reactor» concept ...”

Here are a few references on publications concerning Matros’ scientific and applied significance:

- “The use of heat regeneration in chemical reactors has enjoyed a renaissance since the 1980s largely due to the pioneering work of Matros and Boreskov. The insight of Matros and associates was to couple the principle of heat regeneration and the catalytic fixed bed in the reverse flow reactor and to recognize that the efficacy of this technique was tailor-made for dilute gaseous reaction systems exhibiting adiabatic temperature rises in the range 10-100°C.”
- "The recent review by Kolios et al. (2000) gives the credit to Matros and his co-workers, who in the 1980s elaborated its scientific understanding, demonstrated its potential up to the industrial scale and communicated its principle all around the world (see, e.g., Matros, 1989). Based on their pioneering work a number of applications have been investigated by other researchers, e.g., (i) the oxidation of SO_{2} (e.g., Hong et al., 1997; Xiao et al., 1999), (ii) the treatment of waste air (e.g., Eigenberger and Nieken, 1988; Sapundzhiev et al., 1993; Chaouki et al., 1994; van de Beld et al., 1994; van de Beld and Westerterp, 1996, 1997; Züfle and Turek, 1997a, b; Nijdam and van der Geld, 1997, 1999; Cittadini et al., 2001; Salomons et al., 2004; Kushwaha et al., 2004), (iii) the synthesis of methanol (e.g., Vanden Bussche et al., 1993) and (iv) the oxidation of o-xylene for the production of phthalic anhydride (Quinta Ferreira et al., 1999)."
- “Among the several techniques of FUSO, special attention has been devoted to the periodic alternation of feed introduction between the ends of the packed-bed catalytic reactor, denominated by reverse-flow operation (RFO), whose advantages were enumerated by Matros (1990).”
- “Switching of flow direction was proposed a decade ago by Matros for the oxidation of SO_{2} (Matros, 1986). Reverse-flow reactors have been increasingly used in practice, especially in catalytic oxidation of the various compounds that produce too little heat to sustain autothermicity in a traditional stationary reactor, and also, in processes in which the efficient recovery of the heat of exothermal reactions is of crucial importance. The relevant literature is abundant; we shall mention here the fundamental monograph of Matros (1989), which provides both the description, and theoretical background of the concept of flow-reversal reactors.”
- “Recently, stemming from the pioneering work of Matros and coworkers there has been considerable interest in the cyclic operation of catalytic reactors by periodic flow reversal.”
- “RFR have been extensively investigated in the last 30 years. The group of Matros was the pioneer in the study of RFR, applied first to SO_{2} oxidation, exploring also other reactions...”

In 1993 Matros founded a scientific consulting company called Matros Technologies, Inc. (MT) which gained recognition and became well known in the development different catalytic processes based on reversed-flow reactor conception. In 2008 MT received two awards:

- from the Environmental Protection Agency 2007 Clean Air Excellence Award: Use of Catalytic Materials for Improved Operation in Abatement of VOCs in the Semiconductor Industry;
- Texas Environmental Excellence Award for Innovative Clean-Air Partnership with Texas Instruments to Reduce Air Emissions. Texas Instruments (TI) and Matros Technologies found new ways to reduce air emissions from volatile organic compounds (VOCs) while also reducing fuel use and the resulting emissions of nitrogen oxides. VOCs and nitrogen oxides contribute to the formation of ground-level ozone, an air pollutant with potentially harmful respiratory effects.

== Biography ==
"80th anniversary of Yurii Matros" Boreskov Institute of Catalysis SB RAS. September 16, 2017. http://en.catalysis.ru/news/detail.php?ID=32213

"Honest Fight. The life and fate of Yurii Matros. 1st episode." November 12, 2023. https://www.youtube.com/watch?v=dzXvkDkjcA4

"Honest Fight. The life and fate of Yurii Matros. 2nd episode." November 12, 2023. https://www.youtube.com/watch?v=ly79vPmMGG0

== Major publications ==
Matros’ achievements and scientific activity is reflected in more than 40 patents, 300 publications of which he is the author or coauthor, 5 books of which he is the author, 7 books of which he is the editor-in-chief with and without coauthors.

=== Books ===
- Yu. Sh. Matros, Nestatsionarnye Protsessy v Kataliticheskikh Reaktorakh [Unsteady Processes in Catalytic Reactors], Novosibirsk: “Nauka,” 1982 (in Russian and Chinese languages (1984) )
- Yu. Sh. Matros, Kataliticheskie Prochessy v Nestatsionarnykh Usloviiakh [Catalytic Processes Under Unsteady Conditions], Novosibirsk: “Nauka,” 1987 (in Russian)
- Yu. Sh. Matros, Unsteady Processes in Catalytic Reactors, Elsevier, Amsterdam-Oxford-New York-Tokyo, 1985.
- Yu. Sh. Matros, Catalytic Processes under Unsteady State Conditions, Elsevier, Amsterdam-Oxford- New York-Tokyo, 1989.
- Yu. Sh. Matros, A. S. Noskov, V. A. Chumachenko, Kataliticheskoe Obezvrezhivanie Otkhodiashchikh Gazov Promyshlennykh Proizvodstv [Catalytic Neutralization of Waste Gases in Industrial Production], Novosibirsk: “Nauka,” 1991 (in Russian).

=== Editor-in-chief of scientific work collections (selected list) ===
- Unsteady State Processes in Catalysis: Proceedings of International Conference, 5–8 June 1990, Utrecht: VSP.-, the Netherlands, and Tokyo, Japan.
- Ekologiia I Kataliz [Ecology and Catalysis], Novosibirsk: “Nauka,” 1990.
- Matematicheskoe Modelirovanie Kataliticheskikh Reaktorov [Mathematical Modeling of Catalytic Reactors], Novosibirsk: “Nauka,” 1989.
- Rasprostranenie Teplovykh Voln v Geterogennykh Sredakh [Propagation of Thermal Waves in Heterogeneous Environments], Novosibirsk: “Nauka,” 1988.
- Proceedings of the Third International Conference on Unsteady State Processes in Catalysis. Saint Petersburg, Russia, # 28 June–July 1998. Chemical Engineering Science. Pergamon, Vol. 54, # 20, 1999.

=== Selected list of articles ===
==== General ====
- Yurii Sh. Matros, Grigori A. Bunimovich, and Katherine Fry, Using a Catalyst for Energy Reduction in a Regenerative Thermal Oxidizer, a Case Study, Proceedings of AWMA annual conference, Portland, OR, 2008.
- K. Gosiewski, Yu. Sh. Matros, K. Warmuzinski, M. Jaschikc, and M. Tanczykc, 2008. Homogeneous vs. catalytic combustion of lean methane—air mixtures in reverse-flow reactors, Checmial Engineering Science, 63, 5010 – 5019
- G. A. Bunimovich and Yu. Sh. Matros, 2010, Saving Energy in Regenerative Oxidizers, Chemical Engineering, March 2010, 26-32
- Yu. Sh. Matros and G. A. Bunimovich, 1997. Unsteady-State Reactor Operation. Chapter 4.2. in Handbook of Heterogeneous Catalysis, G. Ertl, H Knözinger, and J. Weitkamp, Editors.
- Yu. Sh. Matros, 1996. Forced Unsteady-State Processes in Heterogeneous Catalysis. Can. J. Chem. Eng., 74 (5), 566-579.
- Yu. Sh. Matros and G. A. Bunimovich, 1996. Reverse-flow operation in fixed bed catalytic reactors. Catal. Rev. - Sci. Eng., 38 (1), 1-68.
- Yu. Sh. Matros, A.S. Noskov, and V.A. Chumachenko, 1991. Catalytic Purification of Industrial Off-Gases, Nauka, Novosibirsk (in Russ.)
- Yu. Sh. Matros, 1990. Mathematical Modeling of Chemical Reactors – Development and Implementation of Novel Technologies, Angew. Chem. Int. Ed. Engl., 29, 1235-1244.
- Yu. Sh. Matros, 1990. Performance of Catalytic Processes under Unsteady-State Conditions, Chem. Eng. Sci., 45, 2097-2102.
- G. K. Boreskov and Yu. Sh. Matros, 1983. Flow Reversal of Reaction Mixture in a Fixed Catalyst Bed, A Way to Increase the Efficiency of Chemical Processes, Appl. Catal., 5, 337-342.
- G. K. Boreskov and Yu. Sh. Matros, 1983. Unsteady-State Performance of Heterogeneous Catalytic Reactions, Cat. Rev.-Sci. Eng., 25 (4), 551-590.
- G. K. Boreskov, G. A. Bunimovich, Yu. Sh. Matros, I. A. Zolotarski, and O. V. Kiselev, 1983. Cyclic Steady-States in Fixed Catalyst Bed Operated at Periodic Flow Reversals, Doklady Akademii Nauk SSSR, 268, 647-650.
- Yu. Sh. Matros, 1981. Reactors with a Fixed Bed of Catalyst, Kinet. and Catal., 22, 501-512 (Russ. Ed.).
- Yu. Sh. Matros, and N. A. Chumakova, 1980. Multiplicity of Steady States in an Adiabatic Catalyst Bed, Doklady Akademii Nauk SSSR, 250, 1421-1424.
- G. K. Boreskov, Yu. Sh. Matros, O. V. Kiselev, and G. A. Bunimovich, 1977. Performance of Heterogeneous Catalytic Process in Unsteady State, Doklady Akademii Nauk SSSR, 237, 160-163.

==== VOC control ====
- J. D. Miller, T. Gilliland, G. A. Bunimovich, and Yu. Sh. Matros, Reducing the Cost of VOC Control in Semiconductor Industry, Pollution Engineering, November 2009, p. 30-33.
- M. L. Hunt, Y. S. Matros, V. O. Strots, G. A. Bunimovich, and M. J. Hoye, 2001. Performance of Manganese Oxide Catalyst in Electronics Industry. A Case Study. Proc. of AW&MA 94th Annual Conference & Exhibition (Orlando, FL, US, Jun. 24 - 28, 2001), CD-ROM, AW&MA.
- Yu. S. Matros, V. O. Strots, G. A. Bunimovich, and M. S. McGrath, 2000. Application of Base Metal Catalysts for VOC Control. Proc. of AW&MA 93rd Annual Conference & Exhibition (Salt Lake City, UT, US, Jun. 18 - 22, 2000), CD-ROM, AW&MA.
- Yu. Sh. Matros, G. A. Bunimovich, V. O. Strots, C. R. Roach, C. M. Lorensen, and M. R. Wherrett, 1999. Retrofitting a Thermal Regenerative Oxidizer in an Automotive Assembly Plant. Emerging Solutions to VOC & Air Toxics Control. Proc. of an AWMA Specialty Conference.
- Yu. Sh. Matros, G. A. Bunimovich, V. O. Strots, S. Stewart, C. R. Roach, and Q. V. Jackson, 1998, Development of an RCO for Treatment of Aluminum Foil Production Emissions (Case Study). Emerging Solutions to VOC & Air Toxics Control. Proc. of an AWMA Specialty Conference (March 4–6, 1998, Clearwater Beach, FL, US) 211-219.
- Yu. Sh. Matros, G. A. Bunimovich, V. O. Strots, D. J. Denne, J. J. Garmaker, R. W. Uhr, B Bullough, C. R. Roach, and C. F. Kovarik, 1997. Conversion of a Regenerative Oxidizer into Catalytic Unit. Emerging Solutions to VOC & Air Toxics Control. Proc. of an AWMA Specialty Conference (Feb. 26 - 28, 1997, San Diego, CA, US), 3 - 13.
- Yu. Sh. Matros, D. E. McCombs, V. O. Strots, G. A. Bunimovich and C. Roach, 1994. Catalytic Reverse-Process for VOC Control: Experimental Data and Reactor Simulation. Environmental Issues and Solutions in Petroleum Exploration, Production and Refining. Proc. of Int. Petroleum Environmental Conf. (2–4 March 1994, Houston, TX), PennWell Books, 44 - 53.
- Yu. Sh. Matros, A. S. Noskov, and V. A. Chumachenko, 1993. Progress in Reverse-Process Application to Catalytic Incineration Problems. Chem. Eng. Proc., 32, 89-98.
- Yu. Sh. Matros, and V. A. Chumachenko, 1986. Unsteady Method of Catalytic Detoxication of Industrial Off-Gases, Khim. Technol. (Russian), 4, 66-73.
- G. K. Boreskov, Yu. Sh. Matros, V. I. Lugovskoy, G. A. Bunimovich and V. I. Puzhilova, 1984. Unsteady-State Process of Complete Oxidation in a Fixed Bed Catalytic Reactor, Teor. Osnovy Khim. Tekhnol. (Theoretical Fundamentals of Chemical Technology), 18, 328-334.

==== SO_{2} oxidation ====
- V. O. Strots, Yu. Sh. Matros and G. A. Bunimovich, 1992. Periodically Forced SO2 Oxidation in CSTR. Chem.Eng.Sci., 47, No. 9 - 11, 2701-2706.
- Matros, Yu. Sh., and G. A. Bunumovich, 1990. Reverse-Process of SO2 Oxidation in Sulfuric Acid Production. Sulphur 1990. Proc. of Int. Conf. (Cancun, Mexico, 1-4 Apr., 1990), 249-265.
- Matros, Yu. Sh., 1987. Unsteady-State Oxidation of Sulfur Dioxide in Production of Sulfuric Acid. Experience in Industry and Outlook. Sulphur 87, Proc. of Int. Conf. (Houston, TX, 1987), 361-377.
- Yu. Sh. Matros, 1986. Unsteady-State Oxidation of Sulfur Dioxide in Sulfuric Acid Production. Sulfur, 183, 23-29.
- Yu. Sh. Matros, G. A. Bunimovich, and G. K. Boreskov, 1984. Unsteady-State Performance of Sulfur Dioxide Oxidation in Production of Sulfuric Acid. In: Frontiers in Chemical Engineering, Vol. 2, L. K. Doraiswami and R. A. Machelkar, Eds., WileyEastern, New Delhi, India.
- G. K. Boreskov, G. A. Bunimovich, Yu. Sh. Matros, and A. A. Ivanov, 1982. Catalytic Process under Non-Steady Conditions. 2. Switching the Direction for the Feed of the Reaction Mixture to the Catalyst Bed. Experimental Results, Int. Chem. Eng., 335-342.

==== NO_{x} reduction ====
- G. Braswell, Yu. Sh. Matros, and G. A. Bunimovich, 2001. NOx in Non-Utility Industries, Parts I and II. Environmental Protection, 6, 50-55; 7, 38-41.
- Yu. Sh. Matros, V. O. Strots, G. A. Bunimovich, I. Kracik, W. Spreutels, D. A. Berkel and A. Vavere, 1999. Sulfuric Acid Production from Viscose Production Plant Effluents. Sulphur 99. Proc. of Int. Conf. (Calgary, Canada, 17-20 Oct., 1999), 249-265.
- A. S. Noskov, L. N. Bobrova, and Yu. Sh. Matros, 1993. Reverse-Process for NOx Off-Gases Decontamination, Catalysis Today, 17, 293-300.
- Yu. Sh. Matros, and A. N. Zagoruiko, 1987. Unsteady-State Catalytic Process of Sulfur Generation by the Claus Reaction, Doklady Akademii Nauk SSSR, 294, 1424-1428.
- Yu. Sh. Matros, A. I. Ivanov, and L. L. Gogin, 1988. Generation of High Potential Energy from Low-Grade Gases and Fuels in the Unsteady-State Operated Catalytic Reactor. Theor. Osnovy Khim. Tekhnologii (Theoretical Fundamentals of Chemical Technology), 22, 481-487.
- G. K. Boreskov, Yu. Sh. Matros, and A.I. Ivanov, 1986. Heat Utilization after Catalytic Combustion of Low Grade Gaseous Fuels in the Reactor with Period Flow Reversals, Doklady Akademii Nauk SSSR, 288, 2, 429-434.

== Videos ==
- Yurii Matros: Unsteady state catalytic processes in industry
- Conference on Unsteady-State Processes in Catalysis, "USPC-3", St. Petersburg, 1998.
- Honest Fight. The life and fate of Yurii Matros. 1st episode.
- Honest Fight. The life and fate of Yurii Matros. 2nd episode.

== Obituary (in Russian) ==
- Yurii Shaevich Matros Died
