= Solzhenitsyn Aid Fund =

Russian non-profit organization

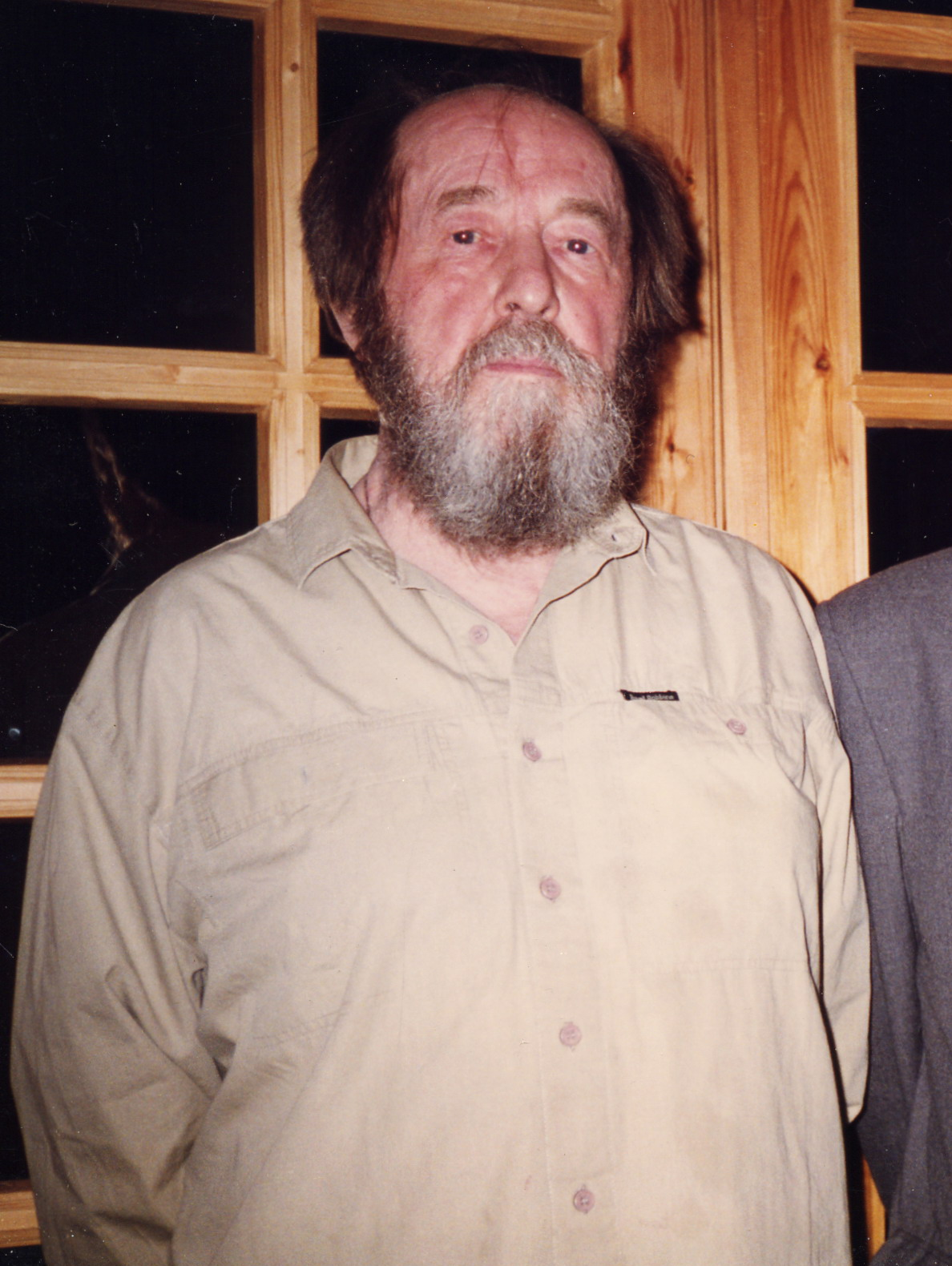
Aleksandr Solzhenitsyn

The Solzhenitsyn Aid Fund (officially Russian Public Fund to Aid Political Prisoners and their Families, also Fund for the Aid of Political Prisoners, Public Aid Fund) was a charity foundation and support network set up by Aleksandr Solzhenitsyn and Alexander Ginzburg that distributed funds and material support to political and religious prisoners across the Soviet Union throughout the 1970s and 1980s.

== Founding ==
The fund was formed on the initiative of writer and political prisoner Alexander Ginzburg. Families of arrested dissidents often suffered repercussions such as the loss of jobs and opportunities to study. During his time in labor camps, Ginzburg managed to coordinate relatives and friends to help other inmates and their families. This included support such as donating household goods for those in exile, helping relatives who faced expulsion from work, or offering places to stay in Moscow for wives who journeyed to visit their husbands in remote Siberian camps.

After his release in 1972, Ginzburg consulted with Aleksandr Solzhenitsyn on how to continue this informal support. Solzhenitsyn offered a quarter of his Nobel Prize award for the cause. After Solzhenitsyn was expelled from the USSR in 1974 following the publication of The Gulag Archipelago, he set up a fund in Switzerland, donating all present and future international royalties for the book to it. The funds were from then on brought into the USSR and distributed through a network of volunteers.

== Activities ==
A first goal of the fund was to help gulag inmates and their families to survive. For this, groups of people, unknown to one another, collected information on the existence and whereabouts of political prisoners across the Soviet Union and distributed funds and other material support to them and their families. Other charitable organizations, such as Christian Orthodox organizations that collected clothing and other items, passed those donations onto the Aid Fund for redistribution. The Aid Fund also contributed funds for the support of political prisoners who were sent to psychiatric imprisonment. It paid for the travel expenses of those who traveled to distant trials to support the political dissenters. A second goal of the fund was the support of cultural initiatives, such as a series of memoirs of emigrants.

The administrators of the fund ensured that the money was sent legally to banks in Moscow; after the state had taken one third in tax, what remained was distributed in roubles. When the authorities found out about the fund, the receiving of the money was blocked. Instead, donations were sent to friends and sympathisers. The KGB then attempted to halt its distribution by telling the families of political prisoners that, if money were accepted, their loved ones would endure even worse conditions in the camps.

According to Solzhenitsyn's wife Natalya, the fund counted up to 120 volunteers.

== Post-Soviet Russia ==
The Aid Fund was revived in the 1990s. It supports impoverished former dissenters. It also instituted a support program for Russian libraries.

== See also ==
- Political Red Cross

== Bibliography ==
- Lim, Jie-Hyun; Walker, Barbara; Lambert, Peter; Walker, Barbara (2014). "Accomplices of Violence: Guilt and Purification through Altruism among the Moscow Human Rights Activists of the 1960s and 1970s". Mass Dictatorship and Memory as Ever Present Past. Springer. pp. 180–203. ISBN 9781137289834.
