= The Oak and the Calf =

1975 memoir by Aleksandr Solzhenitsyn

- Front cover of the Harper Colophon English translation.
- Author: Aleksandr Solzhenitsyn
- Original title: Бодался телёнок с дубом
- Translator: Harry Willetts
- Language: Russian
- Genre: Memoir
- Publication date: 1975
- Publication place: Russia

The Oak and the Calf, subtitled Sketches of Literary Life in the Soviet Union, is a memoir by Russian writer Aleksandr Solzhenitsyn, about his attempts to publish work in his own country. Solzhenitsyn began writing the memoir in April 1967, when he was 48 years old, and added supplements in 1971, 1973, and 1974. The work was first published in Russian in 1975 under the title Бодался телёнок с дубом (lit. "A Calf Head-butting with an Oak", an ironic phrase). It has been translated into English by Harry Willetts.

A second, considerably expanded edition of the Russian text was produced in 1996, by the Moscow publishing house Soglasie. This edition includes new material on the people who helped Solzhenitsyn in his literary tasks before his exile. The writer had previously called these anonymous helpers Nevidimki (the invisible ones). The new material has been translated and published in English as a separate book called Invisible Allies.

The memoir contains a detailed account of the publication of One Day in the Life of Ivan Denisovich and the author's often complex relationship with the editor-in-chief Aleksandr Tvardovsky. It also describes Solzhenitsyn's failed attempts to publish his other early novels, Cancer Ward and The First Circle, the political storm caused by his 1970 Nobel Prize for literature and his subsequent exile from the Soviet Union.

Among Solzhenitsyn's more accessible works, the memoir's reception by critics was mixed. By the time of its publication, outside the Soviet Union much has already been known about the author's struggles. Consequently, some critics questioned the accuracy of Solzhenitsyn's account. Nevertheless, the book remains an essential source on the life and times of the author.

== Background ==
Solzhenitsyn was born in 1918 in Kislovodsk following the death of his father. In 1921, his mother moved to Rostov-on-Don and Solzhenitsyn joined her there in 1926. He attended school and studied physics and mathematics at Rostov State University. At the same time, he studied literature and history by correspondence courses run by the Moscow University Institute of Philosophy. He began to write at this time and spent the first three months of 1937 intensively studying in the Rostov libraries,

During World War II, Solzhenitsyn served as the commander of a sound-ranging battery in the Red Army and was involved in major action at the front, for which he was twice-decorated. In 1945, he was arrested for criticizing Joseph Stalin's conduct of the war in letters to a friend. He was sentenced to eight years in the Gulag. He was released in 1953 and pardoned in 1957.

He later moved to Ryazan, near Moscow, to work as a mathematics teacher. There he wrote his early novels and novellas: One Day in the Life of Ivan Denisovich and The First Circle, based on his time in the Gulag; and Matryona's Place and Cancer Ward, based on his experiences in "internal" exile in rural Russia and Tashkent between 1953 and 1957.

In 1961, he sent the manuscript of One Day in the Life of Ivan Denisovich to Alexander Tvardovsky, poet and chief editor of Novy Mir (Новый Мир - "New World") literary magazine. It was published in edited form in 1962 with the explicit approval of Nikita Khrushchev. Following Khrushchev's fall from power, the political climate in the Soviet Union hardened and the "thaw" in literary censorship ended under Leonid Brezhnev.

In 1963, Solzhenitsyn published three more novellas, the last of his works to be published in the Soviet Union until 1990. The Oak and the Calf covers the period from the publication of One Day to Solzhenitsyn's expulsion from the Soviet Union in 1974.
