= Aleksandr Solzhenitsyn bibliography =

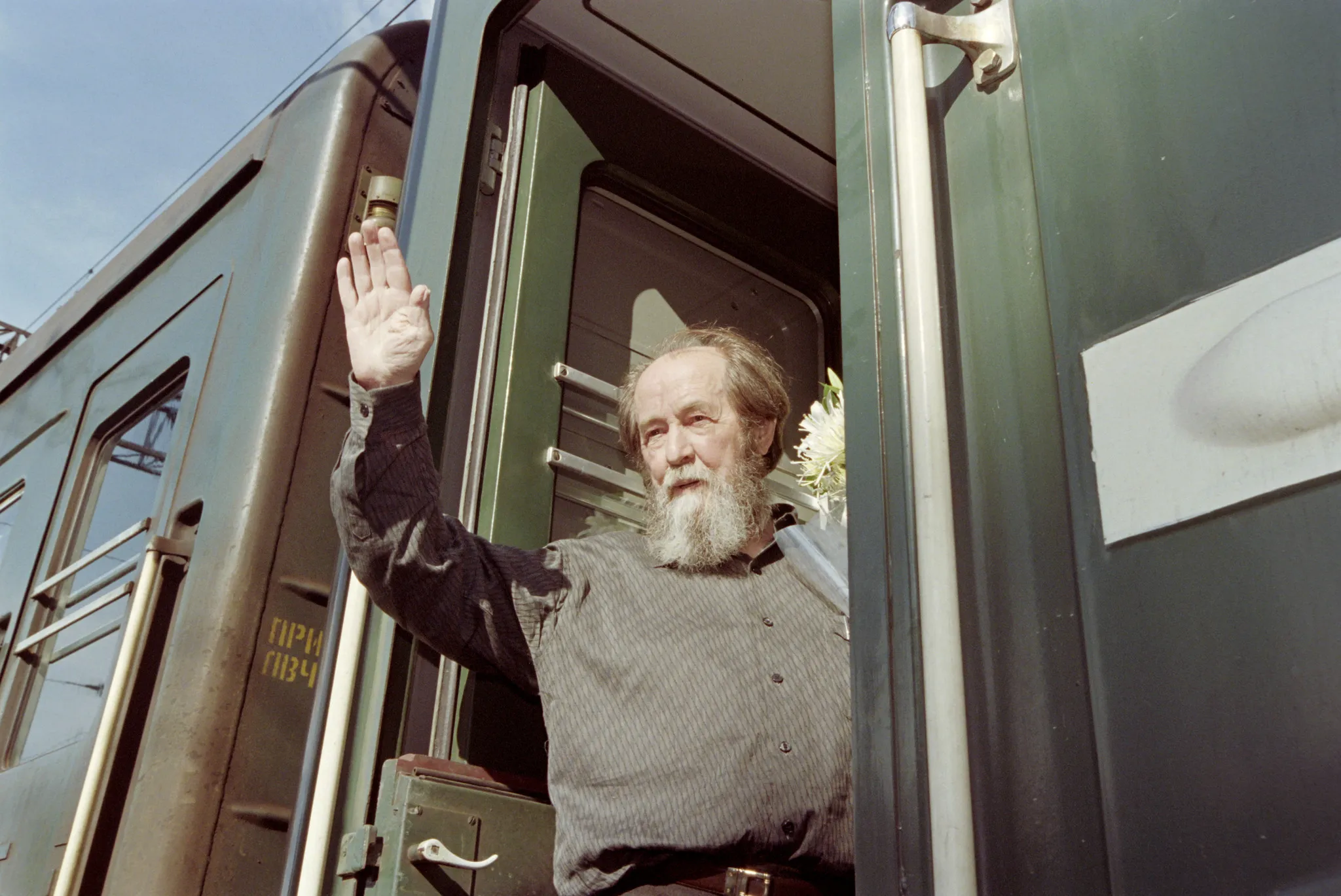
Aleksandr Solzhenitsyn in 1994

This is a bibliography of Aleksandr Solzhenitsyn's works.

== Books ==
- Odin den' Ivana Denisovicha. Moscow: Sovetskii pisatel’. 1963.
  - Odin den' Ivana Denisovicha. Matrenin dvor (authorized, unexpurgated edition — includes “Matrenin dvor”). Paris: YMCA-Press. 1973.
- Izbrannoe. Chicago: Russian Language Specialties. 1965.
- Rakovyi korpus. Milan: Mondadori. 1968.
  - Rakovyi korpus (enlarged edition). Frankfurt: Posev. 1968. (Cancer Ward)
- V kruge pervom. New York: Harper & Row. 1968. (The First Circle)
  - V kruge pervom (enlarged edition). Moscow: Khudozhestvannaia literatura. 1990. ISBN 5-280-01807-4.
- Sobranie sochinenii (6 volumes). Frankfurt: Posev. 1970 [1969]. (Collected Works)
- Avgust chetyrnadtsatogo. Paris: YMCA-Press. 1971. (August 1914)
- Nobelevskaia lektsiia po literature 1970 goda. Paris: YMCA-Press. 1972.
- Arkhipelag Gulag, 1918–1956: Opyt knudozhestvennego issledovaniia (3 volumes). Paris: YMCA-Press. 1973–1975.
- Pis'mo vozhdiam Sovetskogo Soiuza. Paris: YMCA-Press. 1974.
- Solzhenitsyn: A Pictorial Autobiography. New York: Noonday. 1974.
- Prusskie nochi. Paris: YMCA-Press. 1974.
- Lenin v Tsiurikhe. Paris: YMCA-Press. 1975.
- Bodalsia telenok s dubom: Ocherki literaturnoi zhizni. Paris: YMCA-Press. 1975. (The Oak and the Calf, autobiography)
  - Bodalsia telenok s dubom: Ocherki literaturnoi zhizni (enlarged edition — includes "Nevidimki"). Moscow: Soglasie. 1996. ISBN 5-86884-039-9.
- A World Split Apart (bilingual edition). translated by Irina Alberti. New York: Harper & Row. 1978. ISBN 978-0-06-014007-6.
- Sobranie sochinenii (20 volumes). Vermont & Paris: YMCA-Press. 1978–1991.
- Rasskazy. Moscow: Sovremennik. 1989. ISBN 5-270-01089-5.
- Kak nam obustroit' Rossiiu? Posil'nye soobrazheniia. Paris: YMCA-Press. 1990.
- "Russkii vopros" k kontsu XX veka. Moscow: Golos. 1995. ISBN 5-7117-0218-1.
- Po minute v den'. Moscow: Argumenty i fakty. 1995. ISBN 5-85272-019-4.
- Publitsistika (3 volumes). Yaroslavl’: Verkhne-Volzhskoe knizhnoe izdatel’stvo. 1995–1997. ISBN 5-7415-0459-0, 5-7415-0462-0, 5-7415-0478-7.
- Na izlomakh: Malaia proza. Yaroslavl’: Verkhniaia Volga. 1998. ISBN 5-7415-0488-4.
- Rossiia v obvale. Moscow: Russkii put’. 1998. ISBN 5-85887-030-7.
- Proterevshi glaza. Moscow: Nash dom—L’Age d’Homme. 1999. ISBN 5-89136-013-6.
- Dvesti let vmeste, 1795–1995 (volume 1). Moscow: Russkii put’. 2001. ISBN 5-85887-110-0, 5-85887-151-8.
- Armeiskie rasskazy. Moscow: Russkii put’. 2001. ISBN 5-85887-116-X.
- Stolypin i Tsar'. Yekaterinburg: U-FAKTORIIA. 2001. ISBN 5-94176-124-4.
- Lenin. Tsiurikh — Petrograd. Yekaterinburg: U-FAKTORIIA. 2001. ISBN 5-94176-125-2. (Lenin in Zurich - Petrograd)
- Nakonets-to revoliutsiia (2 volumes). Yekaterinburg: U-FAKTORIIA. 2001. ISBN 5-94176-126-0, 5-94176-127-9, 5-94176-128-7.
- Na vozvrate dykhania. Moscow: Vagrius. 2004. ISBN 5-475-00092-1.

== Editions and collections ==
- Arkhipelag GULag (3 volumes). Moscow: Sovetskii pisatel’. 1989. ISBN 5-265-01557-4.
- Rakovyi korpus. Moscow: Khudozhestvennaia literatura. 1990. ISBN 5-280-01870-8.
- V kruge pervom. Moscow: Khudozhestvennaia literatura. 1990. ISBN 5-280-01807-4.
- Krasnoe koleso. Povestvovanie v otmerennykh srokakh (10 volumes). Moscow: Voenizdat. 1993–1997. ISBN 5-203-01576-7, 5203015775, 5203015783, 5-203-01579-1, 5203015805, 5203015813, 5203015821, 5-203-01583-X, 5-203-01584-8, 5-203-01585-6.
- Izbrannoe. Moscow: Molodaia gvardiia. 1993.
- Sobranie sochinenii (9 volumes). Moscow: Terra. 1999–2000. ISBN 5-300-02753-7.
- Na kraiakh. Moscow: Vagrius. 2000.
- Kolokol Uglicha. Moscow: Vagrius. 2003.
- Rakovyi korpus. Moscow: Vagrius. 2003.
- V kruge pervom. Moscow: Vagrius. 2004.
- Dorozhenka. Moscow: Vagrius. 2004.
- Izbrannoe: Proza, literaturnaia kritika, publitsistika. Moscow: Zhizn I Mysl and Moskovskie Uchebniki. 2004. ISBN 5-8455-0059-1.
- Voennoye. St. Petersburg: Amphora. 2005.

== English editions ==
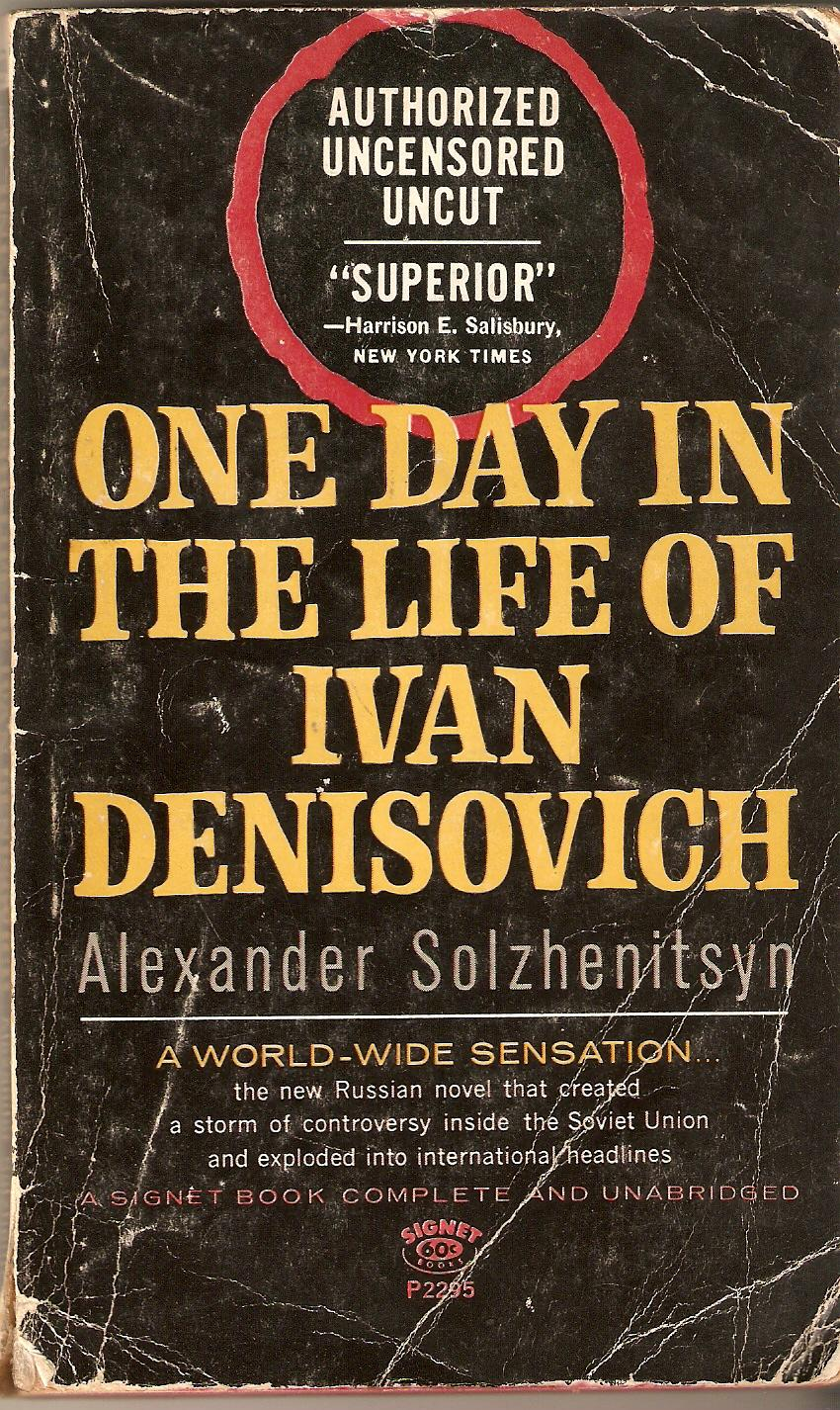

- One Day in the Life of Ivan Denisovich. translated by Ralph Parker. New York: Dutton. 1963. ISBN 978-0-451-52310-5.
  - One Day in the Life of Ivan Denisovich. translated by Ronald Hingley and Max Hayward. New York: Bantam. 1963.
  - One Day in the Life of Ivan Denisovich (authorized translation). translated by H. T. Willetts. New York: Farrar, Straus & Giroux. 1991.
- We Never Make Mistakes: Two Short Novels. translated by Paul W. Blackstock. Columbia: University of South Carolina Press. 1963. (contains An Incident at Krechetovka Station and Matryona's Place)
- The First Circle. translated by Michael Guybon. London: Collins-Harvill. 1968.
  - The First Circle. translated by Thomas P. Whitney. New York: Harper & Row. 1968.
- Cancer Ward. translated by Rebecca Frank. New York: Dial Press. 1968.
  - Cancer Ward. translated by Nicholas Bethell and David Burg. New York: Farrar, Straus & Giroux. 1969. ISBN 978-0-446-36058-6.
- Stories and Prose Poems. translated by Michael Glenny. New York: Farrar, Straus & Giroux. 1971. ISBN 978-0-374-27033-9.
- The Nobel Lecture on Literature. translated by Whitney. New York: Harper & Row. 1972. ISBN 978-0-06-013943-8.
  - Nobel Lecture (bilingual edition). translated by F. D. Reeve. New York: Farrar, Straus & Giroux. 1972. ISBN 978-0-374-22300-7.
- Candle in the Wind. translated by Keith Armes with Arthur G. Hudgins. Minneapolis: University of Minnesota Press. 1973. ISBN 978-0-8166-0681-8.
- Letter to the Soviet Leaders. translated by Hilary Sternberg. New York: Index on Censorship in association with Harper & Row. 1974. ISBN 978-0-06-013913-1.
- The Gulag Archipelago, 1918–1956: An Experiment in Literary Investigation (3 volumes). translated by Thomas P. Whitney and H. T. Willetts. London: Collins-Harvill. 1974–1978.
- August 1914. translated by Michael Glenny. New York: Farrar, Straus & Giroux. 1972. ISBN 978-0-374-10684-3.
  - August 1914. translated by H.T. Willetts. New York: Farrar, Straus & Giroux. 1989.
- Warning to the West. translated by Harris L. Coulter and Nataly Martin. New York: Farrar, Straus & Giroux. 1976.
- Lenin in Zurich. translated by H.T. Willetts. New York: Farrar, Straus & Giroux. 1976.
- Prussian Nights. translated by Robert Conquest. New York: Farrar, Straus & Giroux. 1977.
- East & West: The Nobel Lecture on Literature, A World Split Apart, Letter to Soviet Leaders, and an Interview with Aleksandr Solzhenitsyn by Janis Sapiets. translated by Alexis Klimoff, Irina Alberti, and Hilary Sternberg. New York: Harper & Row. 1980.
- The Oak and the Calf: Sketches of Literary Life in the Soviet Union. translated by H.T. Willetts. New York: Harper & Row. 1980. ISBN 978-0-06-014014-4.
- The Mortal Danger: How Misconceptions About Russia Imperil America. translated by Michael Nicholson and Alexis Klimoff. New York: Harper & Row. 1981. ISBN 978-0-06-090882-9.
- Edward E. Ericson Jr., ed. (1985). The Gulag Archipelago, 1918-1956 [authorized abridgment]. translated by Whitney and H. T. Willetts. New York: Harper & Row.
- Three Plays: Victory Celebrations, Prisoners, The Love-Girl and the Innocent. translated by Bethell, Burg, Hele Rapp, and Nancy Thomas. New York: Farrar, Straus & Giroux. 1986.
- Rebuilding Russia: Reflections and Tentative Proposals. translated by Alexis Klimoff. New York: Farrar, Straus & Giroux. 1991. ISBN 978-0-374-17342-5.
- Invisible Allies. translated by Klimoff and Nicholson. Washington, D.C.: Counterpoint. 1995.
- The Russian Question at the End of the Twentieth Century (includes “Address to the International Academy of Philosophy”). translated by Yermolai Aleksandrovich Solzhenitsyn. New York?: Farrar, Straus & Giroux. 1995. ISBN 978-0-374-25291-5.
- November 1916. translated by Willetts. New York: Farrar, Straus & Giroux. 1999. ISBN 978-0-374-22314-4.
- Russia in Collapse. translated by Olga Cooke. Intercollegiate Studies Institute. May 2006.
- Apricot Jam: And Other Stories. translated by Kenneth Lantz and Stephan Solzhenitsyn. Counterpoint. August 2011.
- The Red Wheel. Node Three. Book 1. March 1917. translated by Marian Schwartz. Indiana: University of Notre Dame Press. 2017. ISBN 978-0-268-10265-4.
- The Red Wheel. Node Three. Book 2. March 1917. translated by Marian Schwartz. Indiana: University of Notre Dame Press. 2019. ISBN 978-0-268-10685-0.
- The Red Wheel. Node Three. Book 3. March 1917. translated by Marian Schwartz. Indiana: University of Notre Dame Press. 2021. ISBN 978-0-268-20170-8.
- The Red Wheel. Node Three. Book 4. March 1917. translated by Marian Schwartz. Indiana: University of Notre Dame Press. 2024. ISBN 978-0-268-20879-0.
- Between Two Millstones, Book 1: Sketches of Exile, 1974–1978. translated by Peter Constantine. Indiana: University of Notre Dame Press. 2018. ISBN 978-0-268-10501-3.
- Between Two Millstones, Book 2: Exile in America, 1978-1994. translated by Peter Constantine. Indiana: University of Notre Dame Press. 2020. ISBN 978-0-268-10900-4.
- 200 Years Together I: The Jews Before the Revolution. Omnia Veritas Ltd. 2024. ISBN 978-1-805-40188-9.
- 200 Years Together II: The Jews in the Soviet Union. Omnia Veritas Ltd. 2024. ISBN 978-1-805-40189-6.
- We Have Ceased to See the Purpose: Essential Speeches of Aleksandr Solzhenitsyn. Indiana: University of Notre Dame Press. April 2025. ISBN 978-0-268-20858-5.
- The Red Wheel. Node Four. Book 1. April 1917. translated by Clare Kitson. Indiana: University of Notre Dame Press. 2025. ISBN 978-0-268-21052-6.
- The Calf Who Butted the Oak: Sketches of a Literary Life. translated by Ignat Solzhenitsyn & Harry Willetts. Indiana: University of Notre Dame Press. 2027. ISBN 978-0-268-21153-0. - forthcoming reworking of 'The Oak and the Calf'

== Uncollected periodical publications ==
- "Golyi god Borisa Pil'niaka". Novyi Mir (January): 195–203. 1997.
- "Smert' Vazir-Mukhtara Iuriia Tynianova". Novyi Mir (April): 191–199. 1997.
- "Peterburg Andreia Belogo". Novyi Mir (July): 191–196. 1997.
- "Iz Evgeniia Zamiatina". Novyi Mir (October): 186–201. 1997.
- "Priemy epopei". Novyi Mir (January): 172–190. 1998.
- "Chetyre sovremennykh poeta". Novyi Mir (April): 184–195. 1998.
- "Ivan Shmelev i ego Solntse mertvykh". Novyi Mir (July): 184–193. 1998.
- "Ugodilo zernyshko promezh dvukh zhernovov: Ocherki izgnaniia". Novyi Mir (9): 47–125. 1998.
  - "Ugodilo zernyshko promezh dvukh zhernovov: Ocherki izgnaniia". Novyi Mir (11): 93–153. 1998.
  - "Ugodilo zernyshko promezh dvukh zhernovov: Ocherki izgnaniia". Novyi Mir (2): 67–140. 1999.
  - "Ugodilo zernyshko promezh dvukh zhernovov: Ocherki izgnaniia". Novyi Mir (9): 112–183. 2000.
  - "Ugodilo zernyshko promezh dvukh zhernovov: Ocherki izgnaniia". Novyi Mir (12): 97–156. 2000.
  - "Ugodilo zernyshko promezh dvukh zhernovov: Ocherki izgnaniia". Novyi Mir (4): 80–141. 2001.
  - "Ugodilo zernyshko promezh dvukh zhernovov: Ocherki izgnaniia". Novyi Mir (11): 31–97. 2003.
- "Okunaias' v Chekhova". Novyi Mir (October): 161–182. 1998.
- "Feliks Svetov — Otverzi mi dveri". Novyi Mir (January): 166–173. 1999.
- "Panteleimon Romanov — rasskazy sovetskikh let". Novyi Mir (July): 197–204. 1999.
- "Aleksandr Malyshkin". Novyi Mir (October): 180–192. 1999.
- "Iosif Brodskii — izbrannye stikhi". Novyi Mir (December): 180–193. 1999.
- "Evgenii Nosov". Novyi Mir (July): 195–199. 2000.
- "Dvoen'e Iuriia Nagibina". Novyi Mir (4): 164–171. 2003.
- "David Samoilov". Novyi Mir (6): 171–178. 2003.
- "Dilogiia Vasiliia Grossmana". Novyi Mir (8): 154–169. 2003.
- "Leonid Leonov—'Vor.'". Novyi Mir (10): 165–171. 2003.
- "Vasilii Belov". Novyi Mir (12): 154–169. 2003.
- "Georgii Vladimov—'General i ego armiia'". Novyi Mir (2): 144–151. 2004.

== Other works ==
- Aleksandr Solzhenitsyn, ed. (1974). Iz-pod glyb. Paris: YMCA.

Translation: Michael Scammell, ed. (1975). From Under the Rubble. Boston: Little, Brown.

- Russkiy slovar yazykovogo rasshireniya. compiled by Aleksandr Solzhenitsyn. Moscow: Nauka. 1990. ISBN 5-02-011076-0.
- The Smatterers, a 1974 essay
