= For the Good of the Cause =

Book by Aleksandr Solzjenitsyn

For the Good of the Cause (Russian: Для пользы дела) is a novella by Russian writer Aleksandr Solzhenitsyn, published in the Russian magazine Novy Mir in 1963. The story is unusual in Solzhenitsyn's canon in that it is set contemporary time, the early 1960s. The action takes place in a provincial town like Ryazan where the author lived after his release from the Gulag and his return from exile in the 1950s. In the town, the students of the local college help to build new college premises by doing most of the work themselves. On completion, the Soviet authorities order that the building should be handed over to a research institute and the students are told that this is "for the good of the cause".

The story is an overt criticism of the lack of democracy that prevailed at the time and the lack of integrity of political leaders. The novella is longer and less successful than the author's others, such as An Incident at Krechetovka Station and Matryona's Place and in 1973, the critic Christopher Moody – a former lecturer in Russian at the University of the Witwatersrand – wrote, "For the Good of the Cause is...a political polemic and was treated as such by the Soviet press".
