= Candle in the Wind (disambiguation) =

"Candle in the Wind" is a 1973 song by Elton John, as a tribute to Marilyn Monroe, also covered by several artists.

Candle in the Wind may also refer to:

- Candle in the Wind (play), a 1941 Broadway drama
- A Candle in the Wind, an alternate title for the 1957 film Danger Stalks Near
- The Candle in the Wind, a 1958 novel by T. H. White
- Annuzza, a Girl of Romania or Candle in the Wind, a 1961 children's novel by Hertha Seuberlich
- Candle in the Wind, a play by Aleksandr Solzhenitsyn
- "Candle in the Wind 1997", by Elton John, as a tribute to Diana, Princess of Wales
