= Prussian Nights =

1947 long poem by Aleksandr Solzhenitsyn

Prussian Nights (Russian: Прусские ночи) is a long poem by Aleksandr Solzhenitsyn, who served as a captain in the Soviet Red Army during the Second World War. Prussian Nights describes the Red Army's march across East Prussia, and focuses on the traumatic acts of rape and murder that Solzhenitsyn witnessed as a participant in that march.

Originally it was Chapter 8 of his huge autobiographic poem Dorozhen'ka (The Road), that he wrote in 1947 as a sharashka (scientific research camp) inmate. The original poem did not survive, but in 1950–1951, working in a hard labour camp near Ekibastuz, Solzhenitsyn restored Chapter 8 and Chapter 9 (The Feast of the Victors) as separate poems. The poem is in trochaic tetrameter, "in imitation of, and argument with the most famous Russian war poem, Aleksandr Tvardovsky's Vasili Tyorkin."

The poem is based on Solzhenitsyn's own experiences – he was a captain of an artillery battery which formed a part of the Second Belorussian Front, which invaded East Prussia from south-east in January 1945. The Soviet offensive followed the path of the disastrous offensive by the Russian Second Army under Alexander Samsonov during World War I; the comparison with the Soviet victorious offensive is one of the underlying themes of the poem.

Solzhenitsyn was arrested soon afterwards, in early February, three weeks after the offensive had started. His arrest was partly due to his critique of the treatment of civilians. In the poem he recalls the pillages, rapes and murders committed by the Soviet troops taking their revenge on German civilians, the events which later resulted in the first part of the German exodus from Eastern Europe.

Дом не жжен, но трепан, граблен.
Чей-то стон стеной ослаблен :
Мать – не на смерть. На матрасе,
Рота, взвод ли побывал –
Дочь-девчонка наповал.
Сведено к словам простым :
НЕ ЗАБУДЕМ ! НЕ ПРОСТИМ !
КРОВЬ ЗА КРОВЬ и зуб за зуб !

— Aleksandr Solzhenitsyn: from Prussian Nights (1974)
Translation:

The little daughter’s on the mattress,
Dead. How many have been on it
A platoon, a company perhaps?
A girl's been turned into a woman,
A woman turned into a corpse.
It's all come down to simple phrases:
Do not forget! Do not forgive!
Blood for blood! A tooth for a tooth!

— Translated by Robert Conquest (1977)

Solzhenitsyn composed the poem—about twelve hundred lines and over fifty pages long—while he was serving a sentence of hard labor in Gulag camps. He wrote a few lines of the poem each day on a bar of soap and memorized them while using it in his daily shower. He also wrote about how composing this poem helped him to survive his imprisonment: "I needed a clear head, because for two years I had been writing a poem—a most rewarding poem that helped me not to notice what was being done to my body. Sometimes, while standing in a column of dejected prisoners, amidst the shouts of guards with machine guns, I felt such a rush of rhymes and images that I seemed to be wafted overhead . . . At such moments I was both free and happy . . . Some prisoners tried to escape by smashing a car through the barbed wire. For me there was no barbed wire. The head count of prisoners remained unchanged, but I was actually away on a distant flight."

He wrote down the poem between the 1950s and 1970s. He made a recording of it in 1969; it was not published in Russian until 1974 when it was published in Paris, France. A German translation was done by Nikolaus Ehlert in 1976, and it was officially first translated into English by Robert Conquest in 1977.

Critical reaction was mixed. The New York Times reviewed it thus: "a clumsy and disjointed 1,400-line narrative which can be called poetry only because it is written in meter and rhyme. Sent to any publishing house of émigré Russian journal bearing any name but Solzhenitsyn's, it would be rejected unhesitatingly." A reviewer in New York Review of Books called Prussian Nights, "for all its shortcomings, a powerful and moving work." The literary critic, author and poet Clive James took a more positive view:

Even in his prose, Solzhenitsyn combines any amount of modern idiom with the whole heritage of literary Russian. Packed into tetrameters, such a vocabulary can yield a daunting variety of effects. [...] The pictorial quality of the whole poem is an eye-opener. There is always a tendency, on the part of his detractors, to make of Solzhenitsyn something less than he is, but here is further evidence that he is something more than even his admirers thought. At the very least, this poem should help to give us an adequate idea of the creative power which the young Solzhenitsyn brought to the task of re-establishing objective truth in a country whose government had devoted so much murderous energy to proving that there can be no such thing.

— Clive James, "The Road to Berlin", New Statesman (1977)

A famous part of the poem describes the phenomenon of Soviet looting:

The conquerors of Europe swarm,

Russians scurrying everywhere... In their trucks they stuff their loot:
Vacuum cleaners, wine, and candles,
Skirts, and picture frames, and pipes,
Brooches, and medallions, blouses, buckles,
Typewriters (not with Russian type),
Rings of sausages and cheeses, small domestic ware and veils,
Combs, and forks, and wineglasses,
Samplers, and shoes, and scales...

== See also ==
- Evacuation of East Prussia
- Lev Kopelev
