= Natalya Reshetovskaya =

Russian chemist and pianist (1919–2003)

Natalya Alekseevna Reshetovskaya (26 February 1919 – 28 May 2003) was a Russian chemist, a pianist and a writer of several memoirs about her life and two marriages to Aleksandr Solzhenitsyn.

== Early life and education ==
Natalya Alekseevna Reshetovskaya was born in Novocherkassk, Russia, on 26 February 1919 before moving with her family to Rostov-on-Don, where she later studied chemistry.

== Personal life and publications ==
Reshetovskaya wrote of several memoirs about her life and marriage to Aleksandr Solzhenitsyn, including Sanya: My Life with Aleksandr Solzhenitsyn, which presented her perspective on their relationship. They were married twice: from 1940 to 1952, and from 1957 until their second divorce in 1972.
