= An Incident at Krechetovka Station =

Novella by Aleksandr Solzhenitsyn

- Cover of the 1972 Sphere Books English translation of the novella and Matryona's Place
- Author: Aleksandr Solzhenitsyn
- Original title: Случай на станции Кочетовка
- Translator: Paul Blackstock (1963)
- Language: Russian
- Genre: Literary fiction
- Publisher: Novy Mir (in Russian), University of South Carolina Press (in English)
- Publication date: 1963
- Publication place: Soviet Union
- OCLC: 250817

An Incident at Krechetovka Station (Russian: Случай на станции Кречетовка) is a novella by Russian writer Aleksandr Solzhenitsyn, published in the Soviet literary magazine Novyi Mir (New World) in 1963. It is one of the few works of prose written by the author that are set during World War II and is said to have been based upon real life events witnessed by the author.

The novella's original title was "Случай на станции Кочетовка" (An Incident at Kochetovka Station) – this is the authentic name of a small railway town in the general area implied by hints in the course of the story – but a change was forced upon Solzhenitsyn by the Novyi Mir editorial board due to its allegorical association with the name of Vsevolod Kochetov, then editor-in-chief of the conservative Soviet literary magazine Oktiabr' (October). In later editions, the author restored the name of the station back to "Kochetovka".

== Plot ==
The action of the novella takes place only over three or four hours, a night in late October 1941, and is written mostly from the viewpoint (though not from inside the mind) of a somewhat short-sighted character called Lieutenant Vasili Zotov, who is the second in command of the station. The brief incident described involves a soldier and actor, Tveritinov, who has lost contact with his military unit and has spent several days trying to catch up, riding on board freight cars without a ticket or identification papers. Zotov is impressed by the actor's warm personality and is moved when shown photographs of the actor's family. But when Tveritinov asks what was the previous name of Stalingrad, Zotov suspects that he is a spy and has him arrested.

Weeks later, Zotov twice asks about the actor only to be told that he "has been taken care of" and "we never make mistakes" – leaving the reader to guess Tveritinov's fate. Solzhenitsyn uses Zotov's restricted mind and overly suspicious thinking as a symbol of Soviet ideology and the workings of the Stalinist police state, but among those of Solzhenitsyn's characters that are overtly loyal to Joseph Stalin, Zotov is one of the more sympathetically written, and who has qualities that the author admires: he is hardworking, eager to do his best and a man of the people. Still, he becomes a tool of the paranoia of Stalinism.

== Film ==
In 1964 a short film based on the novella was shot by Nikolai Rasheyev and Gleb Panfilov as a school project when at the High Courses for Scriptwriters and Film Directors. The Soviet film studio Lenfilm approached Solzhenitsyn, but he rejected the proposal, explaining later that he didn't want see the story distorted. In 1970 a TV film was shot in Sweden (titled Ett möte på Kretjetovkastationen); the script was written by Solzhenitsyn, with Christian Berling playing Zotov and Ulf Johanson as Tveritinov.
