= Nikolai Rasheyev =

Ukrainian film director (1935–2021)

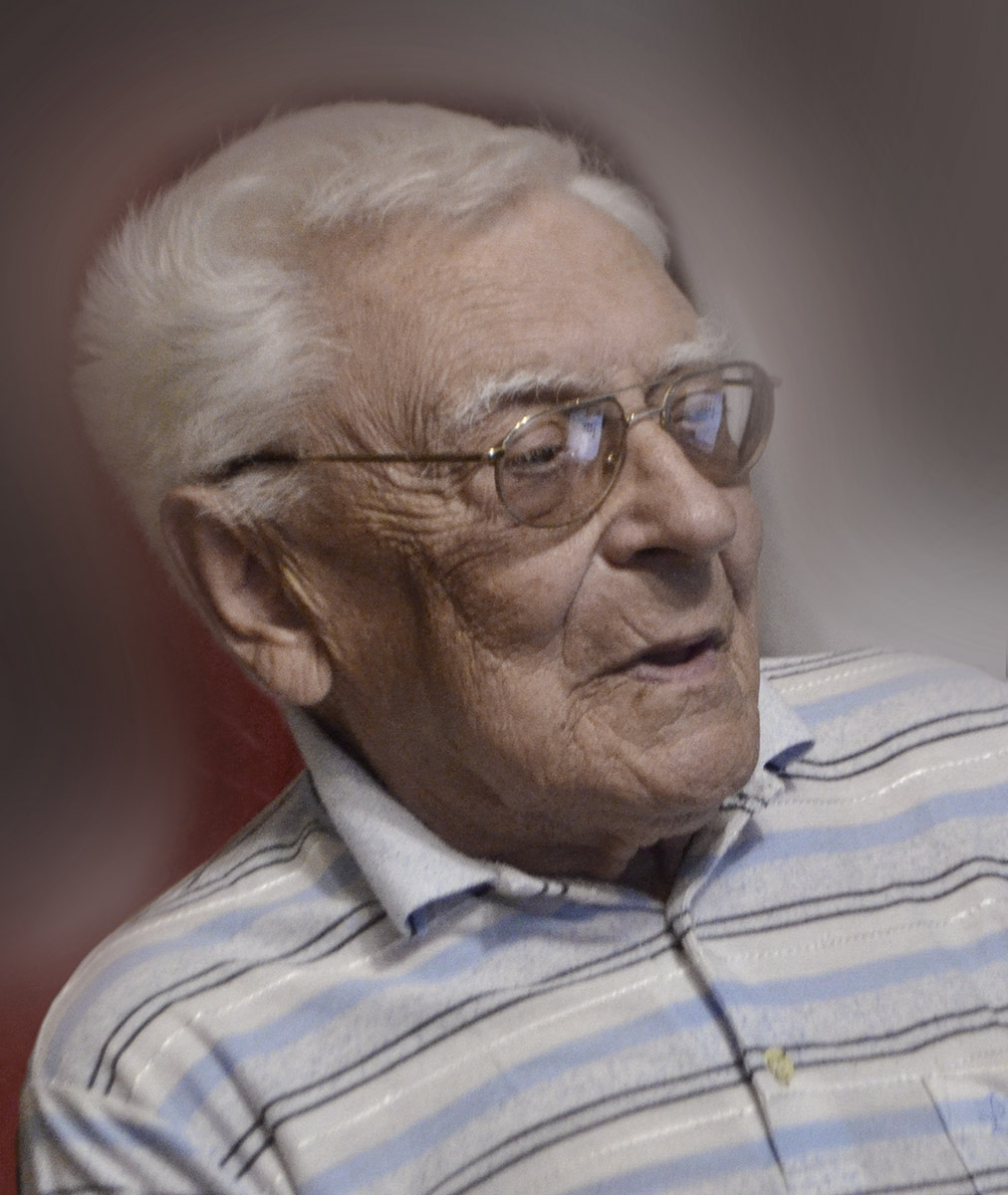
- Born: 8 April 1935
- Died: 5 October 2021 (aged 86)
- Education: Gerasimov Institute of Cinematography
- Occupations: film director and screenwriter

Nikolay Georgievich Rasheyev (Russian: Рашéев Никола́й Геóргиевич; 8 April 1935 – 5 October 2021) was a Soviet and Ukrainian film director and screenwriter.

== Biography ==
Rasheyev was born in Kyiv, Ukraine. His father was a Bulgarian political émigré, who was arrested in 1937. He graduated from the Kyiv Polytechnic Institute in 1957 and enrolled in Gerasimov Institute of Cinematography, from which he was expelled during the campaign against Boris Pasternak's novel Dr. Zhivago. Pasternak was persecuted by the Soviet government until his death and was forced to decline the Nobel Prize. Nikolay Rasheyev, like many of his contemporaries, was expelled from the university after being accused of being "a spiritual brother of Pasternak". He finished his studies at Gerasimov Institute of Cinematography by correspondence. In 1966 he completed advanced coursework in screenwriting and directing.

After being expelled from the Gerasimov Institute, he made use of his earlier engineering education, working in various jobs in northern and eastern Russia, in Tuva, Sakhalin and Chukotka.

In 1964, he graduated from Gerasimov Institute of Cinematography (scriptwriting faculty) and in 1966, the Higher Courses of Scriptwriters and directors.

He worked as an assistant director for TV stations in Chişinău and Kiev and as a director for Perm television and the Moldova-Film studios. He became a director in Dovzhenko Film Studios in 1971. Among his most popular works are Bumbarash and Kings and Cabbage, an adaptation of O. Henry's book of the same name.

== Filmography ==
- 2008 Film about the movie (documentary) / Фильм о фильме (документальный)
- 2008. An almost unbelievable history / Бумбараш. Почти невероятная история
- 2010 My truth (Ukraine, documentary) / Моя правда (Украина, документальный)
- 2010 The Valeriy Zolotukhin´s damnation / Проклятие Валерия Золотухина

== Director ==
- 1964 An Incident at Krechetovka Station (short) / Случай на станции Кречетовка (короткометражный)
- 1965 The Fog (short) / Туман (короткометражный)
- 1968 A small school orchestra / Маленький школьный оркестр
- 1971 Bumbarash / Бумбараш
- 1973 Hare´s reserve/Заячий заповедник
- 1976 The theatre of an unknown actor / Театр неизвестного актера
- 1978 Cabbages and kings/ Короли и капуста
- 1981 Apple on the palm / Яблоко на ладони
- 1984 Make a clown laugh / Рассмешите клоуна
- 1988 Love one's neighbour / Любовь к ближнему
- 1991 Talisman / Оберег

== Screenwriter ==
- 1967 Vertical (dir. Stanislav Govorukhin) / Вертикаль:
- 1968 A small school orchestra / Маленький школьный оркестр
- 1976 The theatre of an unknown actor / Театр неизвестного актера
- 1991 Talisman / Оберег

== Awards ==
- Meritorious Worker of Arts Ukraine (2000).
- Award for leadership in the Tashkent Film Festival for the film Bumbarash.
