= Cancer Ward =

1966 book by Aleksandr Solzhenitsyn

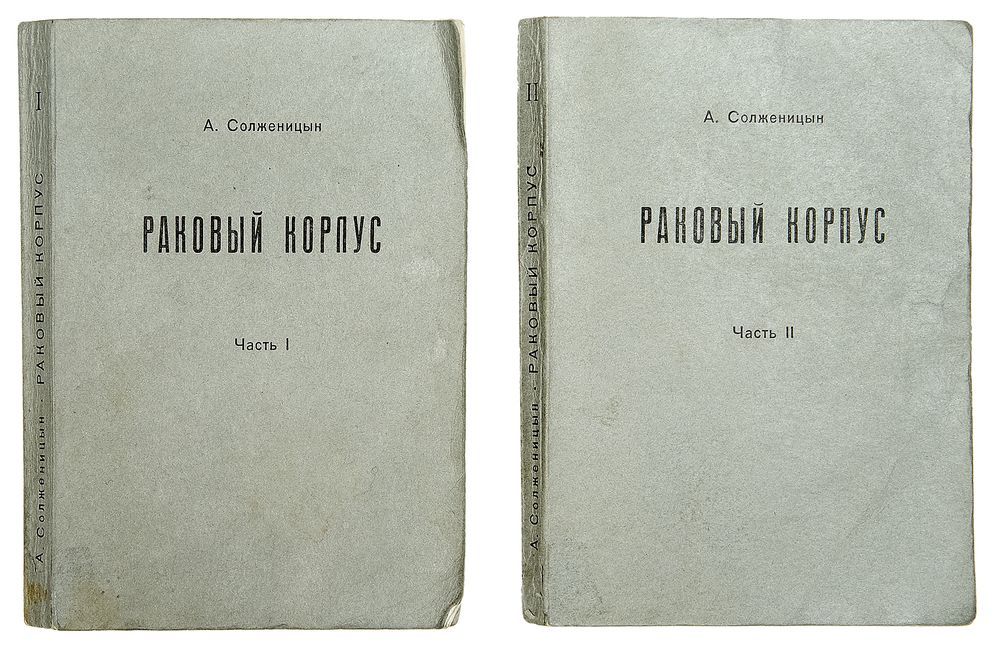
- Cover of the 1st edition, Posev Publishing House, West Germany
- Author: Aleksandr Solzhenitsyn
- Original title: Раковый корпус
- Translators: Nicholas Bethell, David Burg
- Language: Russian
- Genre: Semi-autobiographical novel, political fiction
- Set in: Tashkent, 1955
- Publication place: Soviet Union
- English publication date: The Bodley Head, UK (1968); Dial Press, US (1968)
- Media type: Print (hardback & paperback)
- Pages: 446
- ISBN: 0-394-60499-7
- OCLC: 9576626
- Dewey Decimal: 891.73/44 19
- LC Class: PG3488.O4 R313

Cancer Ward (Russian: Раковый корпус, romanized: Rakovy korpus) is a semi-autobiographical novel by Nobel Prize–winning Russian author Aleksandr Solzhenitsyn. Completed in 1966, the novel was distributed in Russia that year in samizdat, and banned there the following year. In 1968, several European publishers published it in Russian, and in April 1968, excerpts in English appeared in the Times Literary Supplement in the UK without Solzhenitsyn's permission. An unauthorized English translation was published that year, first by The Bodley Head in the UK, then by Dial Press in the US.

Cancer Ward tells the story of a small group of patients in Ward 13, the cancer ward of a hospital in Tashkent, Soviet Uzbekistan, in 1955, two years after Joseph Stalin's death. A range of characters are depicted, including those who benefited from Stalinism, resisted, or acquiesced. Like Solzhenitsyn, the main character, the Russian Oleg Kostoglotov, spent time in a labor camp as a "counter-revolutionary" before he was exiled to Central Asia under Article 58.

The story explores the moral responsibility of those implicated in Stalin's Great Purge (1936–1938), during the murders of millions, sent to camps, or exiled. One patient worries that a man he helped to jail will seek revenge, while others fear that their failure to resist renders them as guilty as any other. "You haven't had to do much lying, do you understand? ..." one patient tells Kostoglotov. "You people were arrested, but we were herded into meetings to 'expose' you. They executed people like you, but they made us stand up and applaud the verdicts ... And not just applaud, they made us demand the firing squad, demand it!"

Toward the end of the novel, Kostoglotov realizes the damage is too great, there will be no healing after Stalin. As with cancer, there may be periods of remission, but no escape. On the day of his release from the hospital, he visits a zoo, seeing in the animals people he knew: "[D]eprived of their home surroundings, they lost the idea of rational freedom. It would only make things harder for them, suddenly to set them free."

== Background ==
Like much of Solzenitsyn's work, the timescale of the novel is brief – a few weeks in the spring of 1955. This places the action after the death of Joseph Stalin and the fall of MVD chief Lavrenti Beria, but before Nikita Khrushchev's 1956 "secret speech" denouncing aspects of Stalinism, one of the heights of the post-Stalin "thaw" in the USSR. A purge of the Supreme Court and the fall of the senior Stalinist Georgy Malenkov take place during the time of the novel's action.

== Plot summary ==
=== Overview ===
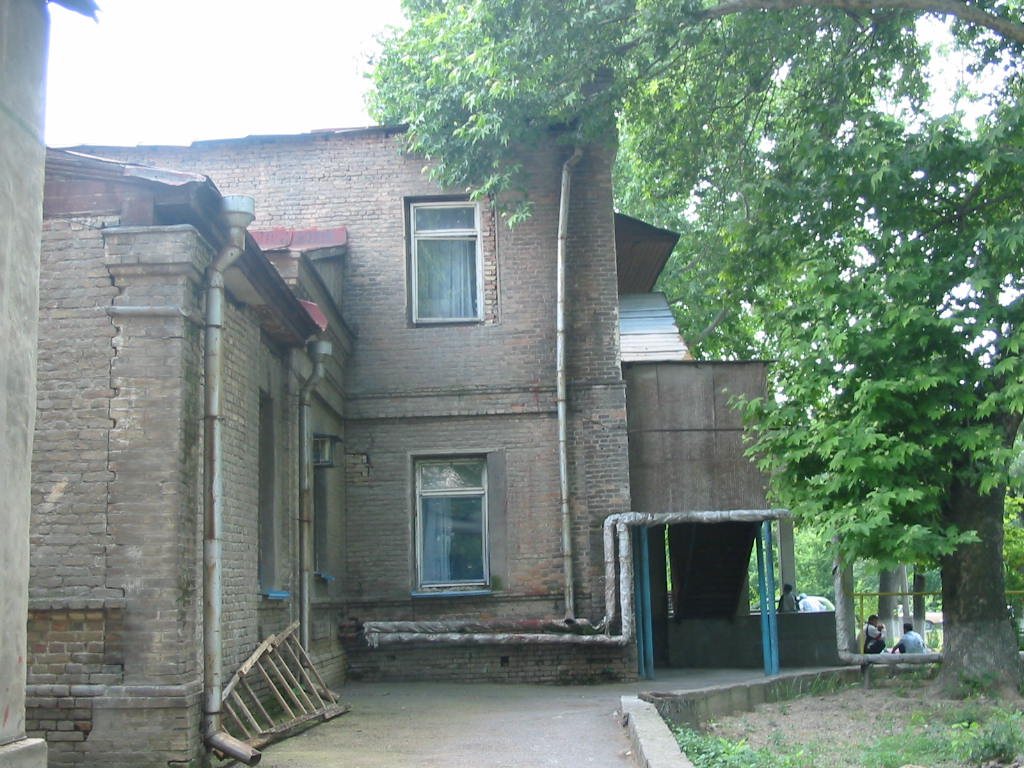
The hospital in Tashkent that inspired Solzhenitsyn, 2005

The plot focuses on a group of patients as they undergo crude and frightening treatment in a squalid hospital. Writer and literary critic Jeffrey Meyers writes that the novel is the "most complete and accurate fictional account of the nature of disease and its relation to love. It describes the characteristics of cancer; the physical, psychological, and moral effects on the victim; the conditions of the hospital; the relations of patients and doctors; the terrifying treatments; the possibility of death." Kostoglotov's central question is what life is worth, and how we know if we pay too much for it.

The novel is partly-autobiographical. Like Solzhenitsyn, Kostoglotov is a former soldier and GULAG prisoner in a hospital for cancer treatment from internal perpetual exile in Kazakhstan. In a chapter called “The Root From Issyk-Kul,” Kostoglotov’s doctor discovers a vial of dark fluid in his bedside table, prompting Kostoglotov to explain the contents are an extract of a root used by natural healers in Russia to cure cancer. Solzhenitsyn ingested the same root extract before his cancer went into remission. Kostoglotov is depicted as born in Leningrad, Solzhenitsyn was born in Kislovodsk.

Bureaucrats and the nature of power in Stalin's State are represented by Pavel Nikolayevich Rusanov, a "personnel officer," bully, and informer. The corrupt power of Stalin's regime is shown through his dual desires to be a "worker", and achieve a "special pension." He is discomfited by signs of a political thaw, and fears a rehabilitated man he denounced 18 years ago (to obtain the whole apartment they shared) will seek revenge. He praises his arrogant daughter, but severely criticizes his son for showing stirrings of humanity. After he is discharged, he believes he is cured, but the staff privately give him less than a year to live; his cancer cannot be rooted any more than the corruption of the 'apparatchik' class to which he belongs. At the end, Rusanov's wife drops rubbish from her car window, symbolizing the carelessness with which the State treated the country. The clinic staff frequently mislead the patients about the severity of their disease and often discharge patients they cannot help, so the number of dead patients is kept to a minimum.

Some local landmarks of Tashkent are mentioned in the novel, such as the trolley line and Chorsu Bazaar. The zoo Kostoglotov visits is now a soccer field near Mirabad Amusement Park.

=== Conclusion ===
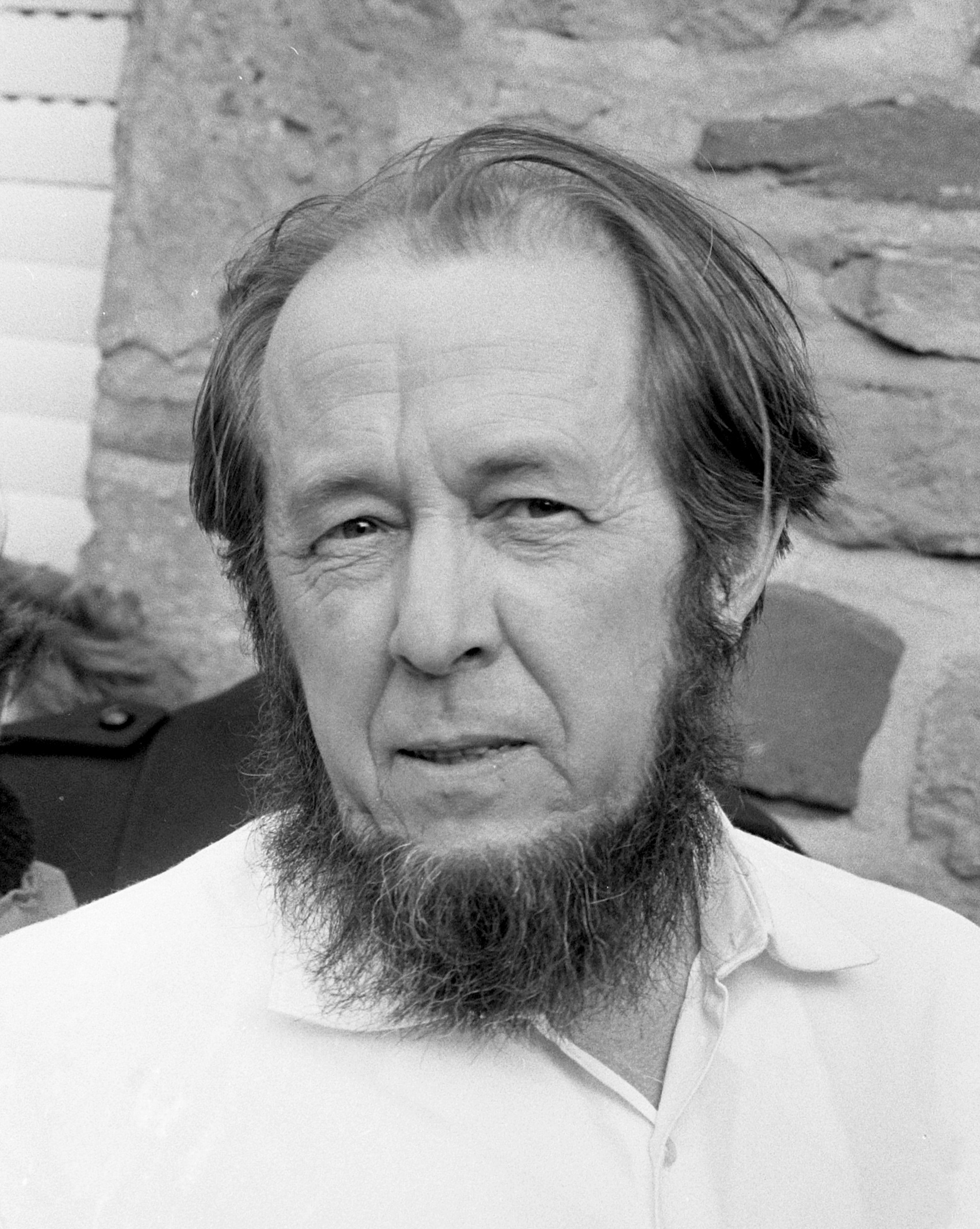
Aleksandr Solzhenitsyn in 1974.

Kostoglotov begins two romances in the hospital, one with Zoya, a nurse and medical student, though the attraction is mostly physical, and a more serious one with Vera Gangart, one of his doctors, a middle-aged woman who has never married, and whom he imagines he might ask to become his wife. Both women invite him to stay overnight in their apartment when he is discharged, ostensibly as a friend, because he has nowhere to sleep; his status as an exile makes finding a place to lodge difficult.

His feelings for Vera are strong and seem to be reciprocated, though neither of them has spoken of it directly:

He could not think of her either with greed or with the fury of passion. His one joy would be to go and lie at her feet like a dog, like a miserable beaten cur, to lie on the floor and breathe on her feet like a cur. That would be a happiness greater than anything he could imagine.

Toward the end of the novel, Kostoglotov realizes that the damage done to him, and to Russia, was too great, and that there will be no healing now that Stalin has gone. He has forgotten how to live a normal life. On the day of his release from hospital he visits a zoo, seeing in the animals people he knew:

The most confusing thing about the imprisoned animals was that even supposing Oleg took their side and had the power, he would still not want to break into the cages and liberate them. This was because, deprived of their home surroundings, they had lost the idea of rational freedom. It would only make things harder for them, suddenly to set them free.

This was the odd way Kostoglotov reasoned. His brain was so twisted that he could no longer see things simply and dispassionately. Whatever he experienced from now on, there would always be this shadow, this grey spectre, this subterranean rumbling from the past.

One of the cages was empty, with a sign nailed to it, "Macaque Rhesus", then: "The little monkey that used to live here was blinded because of the senseless cruelty of one of the visitors. An evil man threw tobacco into Macaque Rhesus's eyes." Kostoglotov was "struck dumb" by this: "Why? It's senseless. Why?" The cruelty apart, he was struck by the absence of propaganda in the note. The attacker was not an agent of American imperialism or an anti-humanist. He was just an evil man.

Kostoglotov leaves the zoo, and after wandering around town decides against going to see Zoya or Vera. He does find the courage to go to Vera's once, but he has left it so late in the day that she is no longer there, and he decides not to try again. He is well aware that the hormone therapy used as part of his cancer treatment may have left him impotent, just as imprisonment and exile have taken all the life out of him. He feels he has nothing left to offer a woman, and that his past means he would always feel out of place in what he sees as normal life. Instead, he decides to accept less from life than he had hoped for, and to face it alone. He heads to the railway station to fight his way onto a train to Ush-Terek, the distant village to which he had been exiled and where he has friends. He writes a goodbye letter to Vera from the station:

You may disagree, but I have a prediction to make: even before you drift into the indifference of old age, you will come to bless this day, the day you did not commit yourself to share my life ... Now that I am going away ... I can tell you quite frankly: even when we were having the most intellectual conversations and I honestly thought and believed everything I said, I still wanted all the time, all the time, to pick you up and kiss you on the lips.

So try to work that out.

And now, without your permission, I kiss them.

== Symbolism ==
The novel makes many symbolical references to the state of Soviet Russia, in particular the quote from Kostoglotov: "A man dies from a tumour, so how can a country survive with growths like labour camps and exiles?"

Solzhenitsyn writes in an appendix to Cancer Ward that the "evil man" who threw tobacco in the macaque's eyes at the zoo represents Stalin, and the monkey the political prisoner. The other zoo animals also have significance, the tiger reminiscent of Stalin and the squirrel running itself to death the proletariat.

== Publishing history ==
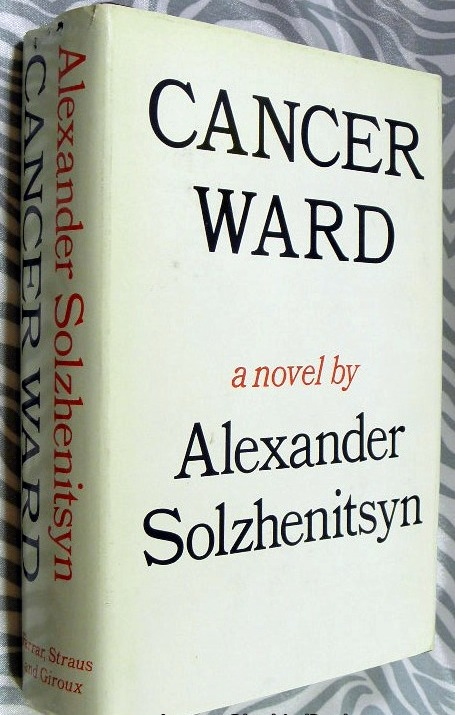
Farrar, Straus and Giroux's 1969 edition

Solzhenitsyn finished Cancer Ward in mid-1966, and by June, sent the manuscript to the Russian literary magazine Novy Mir. The editor, Tvardosky, equivocated and requested cuts, so Solzhenitsyn arranged the novel be distributed as samizdat, then it be discussed at a meeting in Moscow of the Central Writers' Club on 17 November 1966. Joseph Pearce writes attendance was higher than usual. The club resolved to assist Solzhenitsyn in publishing Cancer Ward.

Solzhenitsyn gave an unauthorized interview to a Japanese journalist that month about The First Circle, another novel of his the Soviet bureaucrats blocked, and read from Cancer Ward to six hundred people at the Kurchatov Institute of Physics. In 1968, a Russian edition was published in Europe, and in April, unauthorized excerpts appeared in English in the Times Literary Supplement in the UK. An unauthorized English translation was published in 1968, first by The Bodley Head in the UK, then by Dial Press in the US. The following year Solzhenitsyn was exiled from the Union of Soviet Writers.

== Character list ==
=== Clinic staff ===
- Vera Kornilyevna Gangart, the doctor who treats Kostoglotov with particular kindness. Vera lost her sweetheart in the war, and is dedicated to saving Kostoglotov
- Ludmila Afanasyevna Dontsova, the head of the radiotherapy and fluoroscopy section of the cancer ward who herself falls ill but refuses to be told anything about her treatment
- Zoya, the nurse/student doctor in training who is one of Kostoglotov's love interests
- Lev Leonidovich, the head of the surgeon section, who used to work in a prison camp
- Yevgenia Ustinovna, the gifted surgeon, Lev Leonidovich's colleague, who wears too much lipstick and is an avid smoker
- Nellya, the unreliable orderly who at the end of the book is promoted to food orderly
- Elizaveta Anatolyevna, the reliable orderly who Kostoglotov discovers used to live near him in Leningrad
- Nizamutdin Bahramovich, the head of the clinic, non-competent specialist, absent throughout the book
- Olympiada Vladislavovna, the experienced and competent nurse who is nevertheless taken away to attend an unimportant conference during much of the action

=== Patients ===
- Oleg Filimonovich Kostoglotov, the main protagonist, whose last name means "bone swallower," exiled "in perpetuity" in a village called Ush Terek on the steppe
- Pavel Nikolayevich Rusanov, the 'personnel' official suffering from lymphoma. Married to Kapitolina Matveyevna, and father to Yuri, Maika, Aviette and Lavrenti Pavlovich (named after Lavrentiy Beria)
- Dyomka (Dyoma), the young student with 'a passion for social problems' who has had an unlucky life, culminating in the amputation of his leg in the cancer ward
- Vadim Zatsyrko, the geologist who plans to leave his mark on the world of science after his certain death from melanoblastoma
- Aleksei Filippovich Shulubin, the librarian who regrets his life of not speaking out against the regime, and suffers from rectal cancer
- Asya, the gymnast Dyomka grows fond of while she requires a mastectomy in the clinic
- Sharaf Sibgatov, the mild-mannered Tatar who is a permanent resident on the landing of the cancer ward due to crippling spinal cancer
- Ahmadjan, the Uzbek patient who makes a full recovery, at the end of the novel it appears he is a prison camp guard
- Yefrem Podduyev, a strong overseer who begins to read Leo Tolstoy in his final days of life at the cancer ward
- Friedrich Federau, exiled Russian German who remains a loyal member of the Communist Party
- Maxim Petrovich Chaly, a smuggler who befriends Pavel Nikolayevich

=== Others ===
- Dormidont Tikhonovich Oreshchenkov, Ludmilla Afanasyevna's teacher, a respectable doctor with his own private practice
- The Kadmins, Kostoglotov's exile neighbours and friends, who also spent seven years in the prison camps
- Alla (Aviette) Pavlovna Rusanova, Pavel Nikolayevich's daughter, a poet
- Yuri Pavlovich Rusanov, Pavel Nikolayevich's son, a prosecutor
- Kapitolina Matveyevna Rusanova, Pavel Nikolayevich's wife
- Dr. Maslennikov, a doctor who writes to Kostoglotov about the benefits of chaga, birch fungus, in curing cancer
