= Paul W. Blackstock =

20th-century American intelligence agent and author

Paul W. Blackstock (c. 1913–14 August 1978) was a former US Army Intelligence officer who wrote books and articles on counterintelligence after leaving service.

== Career ==
Blackstock worked for the US Army Intelligence during World War II, and later specialized in psychological warfare. In 1960 he became an associate professor at the University of South Carolina. He is credited with having first translated works of Aleksandr Solzhenitsyn from Russian to English.

As of January 1973, Blackstock had published four books and 20 articles.

A book review by the New York Times of The Strategy of Subversion (1965) said that author could have "written a briefer, modern handbook along the lines of Machiavelli's The Prince" instead of the "somewhat discursive" and "redundantly" (long) text." The book criticizes the CIA for its role in the Bay of Pigs fiasco in 1961.

A book review by the CIA stated that The Secret Road to World War Two (1969) had "grave defects" resulting from the author's being "insufficiently grounded in intelligence, or insufficiently critical, to make discriminating judgments about his sources."

== Death ==
Paul W. Blackstock died on 14 August 1965, aged 65.

== Selected works ==
=== Books authored ===
- The Strategy of Subversion: Manipulating the Politics of Other Nations (Chicago: Quadrangle, 1964)
- Agents of Deceit (1966)
- Secret Road to World War Two: Soviet versus Western Intelligence, 1921-1939 (1969)
- The CIA and the Intelligence Community: Their Roles, Organization, and Functions (St. Charles, MO: Forum Press, 1974)

=== Books co-authored ===
- The Right to Know, to Withhold & to Lie (1969)
- "Covert Military Operations," Handbook of Military Institutions edited by Roger W. Little(Sage, 1971)
- Intelligence, Espionage, Counterespionage, and Covert Operations (1978)

=== Books edited ===
- The Russian Menace to Europe (1953)

=== Books translated ===
- We Never Make Mistakes by Alexander Solzhenitsyn (1963)

=== Articles ===
- "The Central Intelligence Agency," Twentieth Century 21 (Spring 1966)
- "The CIA and the Penkovskiy Affair: 'A New Dis-Service for all Concerned'," Worldview 9 (Feb 1966)
- "CIA: A Non-Inside Report." Worldview 9:5 (May 1966)
- "'Books for Idiots': False Soviet 'Memoirs'," The Russian Review 25:3 (Jul 1966)
- "The Tukhachevsky Affair," The Russian Review (Apr 1969)
- "On the Moral Implications of Torture and Exemplary Assassination" (May 1970)
- "The Intelligence Community Under the Nixon Administration," Armed Forces and Society 1 (Feb 1975)
- "Counterintelligence and the Constitutional Order," Society 12 (Mar-Apr 1975)

== External sources ==
- Professor Paul W. Blackstock to Lecture at the University of Dayton (1-29-1973)
- Muskingum University - Paul W. Blackstock
