= Solzhenitsyn: A Biography =

1984 book by Michael Scammell

- Author: Michael Scammell
- Language: English
- Subject: Aleksandr Solzhenitsyn
- Genre: biography
- Publisher: W. W. Norton & Company
- Publication date: 1984
- Publication place: United States
- Pages: 1051

Solzhenitsyn: A Biography is a 1984 book by the English writer Michael Scammell. It is a biography about the Russian writer Aleksandr Solzhenitsyn.

In his review for The New York Times, Norman Stone called the book "the first biography of Mr. Solzhenitsyn that is likely to go far beyond narrow literary and emigrant circles". It was awarded the 1985 Los Angeles Times Book Prize for Biography.
