= Matryona's Place =

1959 novella by Aleksandr Solzhenitsyn

Cover of the 1975 Penguin edition of the English translation.

Matryona's Place (Russian: Матрёнин двор, romanized: Matryonin dvor), sometimes translated as Matryona's Home (or House), is a novella written in 1959 by Aleksandr Solzhenitsyn. First published by Aleksandr Tvardovsky in the Russian literary journal Novy Mir in 1963, it is Solzhenitsyn's most read short story.

The narrator, a former prisoner of the Gulag and a teacher of mathematics, has a longing to return to live in the Russian provinces and takes a job at a school on a collective farm. Matryona offers him a place to live in her tiny, run-down home, but he is told not to expect any "fancy cooking." They share a single room where they eat and sleep; the narrator sleeps on a camp-bed and Matryona near the stove. The narrator finds the farm workers' lives little different from those of the pre-revolutionary landlords and their serfs. Matryona works on the farm for little or no pay. She is forced to give a small annex of her home to a relative who wants to use the wood from it to build a house elsewhere in the village. A group of drunken farmers, with a tractor borrowed without permission, decide to move the wood at night. Matryona, typically, offers to help. During the chaos that follows she is killed by a train. Her character has been described as "the only true Christian (and) the only true Communist" and her death symbolic of Russia's martyrdom.

Set in 1956, six years after the events portrayed in One Day in the Life of Ivan Denisovich, the novella is considered to be one of the author's finest literary achievements. It is accessible to non-native speakers who have learnt Russian to an intermediate level.

== In psychoanalysis ==
In one of her works (1972), Gisela Pankow attempts to examine the plot of Matryona's Place from the point of view of psychoanalysis. According to her, the central theme of the work is the "disarticulated house". As a young woman, Matryona, thinking that her fiancé is dead, marries his brother, and when he returns alive, the fiancé threatens to kill her, resulting in a secret identity between Matryona and the house that eventually leads to her death. Lived time stopped for here with the threat, and space became open and dangerous for Matryona, so she let herself die when the time came for the "open" to get her. From the point of view of psychoanalysis, it is necessary to go back to the patient's past and prevent such a development by restoring identity.

== Sources ==
- Björkegren, Hans; Eneberg, Kaarina (1973), Aleksandr Solzhenitsyn: A Biography, Henley-on-Thames: Aiden Ellis, ISBN 0-85628-005-4.
- Feuer, Kathryn, ed. (1976), Solzhenitsyn: A Collection of Critical Essays, Prentice-Hall, ISBN 013822627X.
- Klimoff, Alexis; Ericson, Edward E., Jr (2008), The Soul and Barbed Wire: An Introduction to Solzhenitsyn, Lanham, MD: Intercollegiate Studies Institute, ISBN 978-1-933859-57-6.
- Mihalchenko, Igor (1985), Russian intermediate reader, Lincolnwood, Ill., U.S.A: National Textbook Co, ISBN 0-8442-4264-0.
- Moody, Christopher (1973), Solzhenitsyn, Edinburgh: Oliver & Boyd, ISBN 0-05-002600-3.
- Scammell, Michael (1986), Solzhenitsyn: A Biography, London: Paladin, ISBN 0-586-08538-6.
- Solzhenitsyn, A (1970), Matryona's House, translated by Michael Glenny, The Bodley Head, ISBN 0-370-01451-0.
- Solzhenitsyn, A (1972), We Never Make Mistakes, translated by Paul Blackstock, Sphere Book, ISBN 0-7221-8028-4, Includes translations of An Incident at Krechetovka Station and Matryona's House.
