= Vladimir Yurasov =

Russian-American writer and journalist (1914–1966)

- Vladimir Rudolph Shabinsky
- Yurasov in the 1950s
- Born: Vladimir Ivanovich Zhabinsky (Russian: Владимир Иванович Жабинский); October 15, 1914; Sibiu, Romania
- Died: November 16, 1996 (aged 82); Nyack, New York, U.S.
- Other names: S. Yurasov; Vladimir Yurasov; Vladimir Rudolph; Colonel Rudolph
- Citizenship: Soviet, American
- Occupations: Writer, journalist
- Years active: 1951–1981
- Spouse: Xenia Kalinin
- Children: Sophie L. Shabinsky

Vladimir Rudolph Shabinsky (né Zhabinsky (Note: Russian: Владимир Иванович Жабинский, romanized: Vladimir Ivanovich Zhabinsky); October 15, 1914 – November 16, 1996), better known by the pseudonym Vladimir Yurasov, was a Russian-American writer and journalist. He was an employee of Radio Liberty for 30 years.

== Biography ==
Vladimir Rudolph Shabinsky, later known as Vladimir Yurasov, was born on October 15, 1914, in Sibiu, Romania. He grew up in the family of his stepfather in Rostov-on-Don. In 1930 he graduated from school. He briefly worked as an electrician.

In 1932 Yurasov moved to Leningrad. There, he worked as a foreman at the Red Putilovite Plant.

In 1934 Yurasov entered the literary faculty of the Leningrad Institute of History, Philosophy and Linguistics (in 1936 this university was united with the University of Leningrad).

In 1937 Yurasov was arrested upon a denunciation made by his neighbor in order to acquire Yurasov's apartment. He was sentenced to eight years in camps, and was to serve his sentence in Segezhlag, in Karelia. With the outbreak of World War II, prisoners were evacuated eastwards, and during the bombing of the train that he was aboard, Yurasov managed to escape.

Yurasov lived in hiding for three years, and after the liberation of Rostov-on-Don in 1943 he forged his identity and received new documents under the name of Vladimir Ivanovich Rudolph (Russian: Владимир Иванович Рудольф). Initially he worked at a factory, from where he was subsequently drafted into the army, where he rose to the rank of lieutenant colonel.

In 1946 he was transferred to the Soviet Military Administration in Germany. In 1947 he was demobilized.

In the same year, Yurasov received an order to go to Moscow for document verification, prompting him to flee to West Berlin. After a long delay in 1951, he received permission to enter the United States. In the same year he began publishing his works, first under the pseudonym S. Yurasov, recommended to him by Roman Gul, and since 1952 as Vladimir Yurasov and Vladimir Rudolph. Since the beginning of the 1970s he moved away from literature.

From 1952 to 1981 he worked at the Radio Liberty station. In his last years, he lived in Valley Cottage, New York. He died on November 16, 1996, in Nyack, New York, and was buried in the nearby Nanuet cemetery.

== Personal life ==
Yurasov married Xenia N. Kalinin (Russian: Ксения Никитична Куломзина-Калинина, romanized: Kseniya Nikitichna Kulomzina-Kalinina). Together, they had a daughter, Sophie Leinbach Shabinsky (1965–2018).
