= Novo-Diveevo =

Monastic community in Nanuet, Rockland County, New York State

Coordinates: 41°06′38″N 74°01′30″W

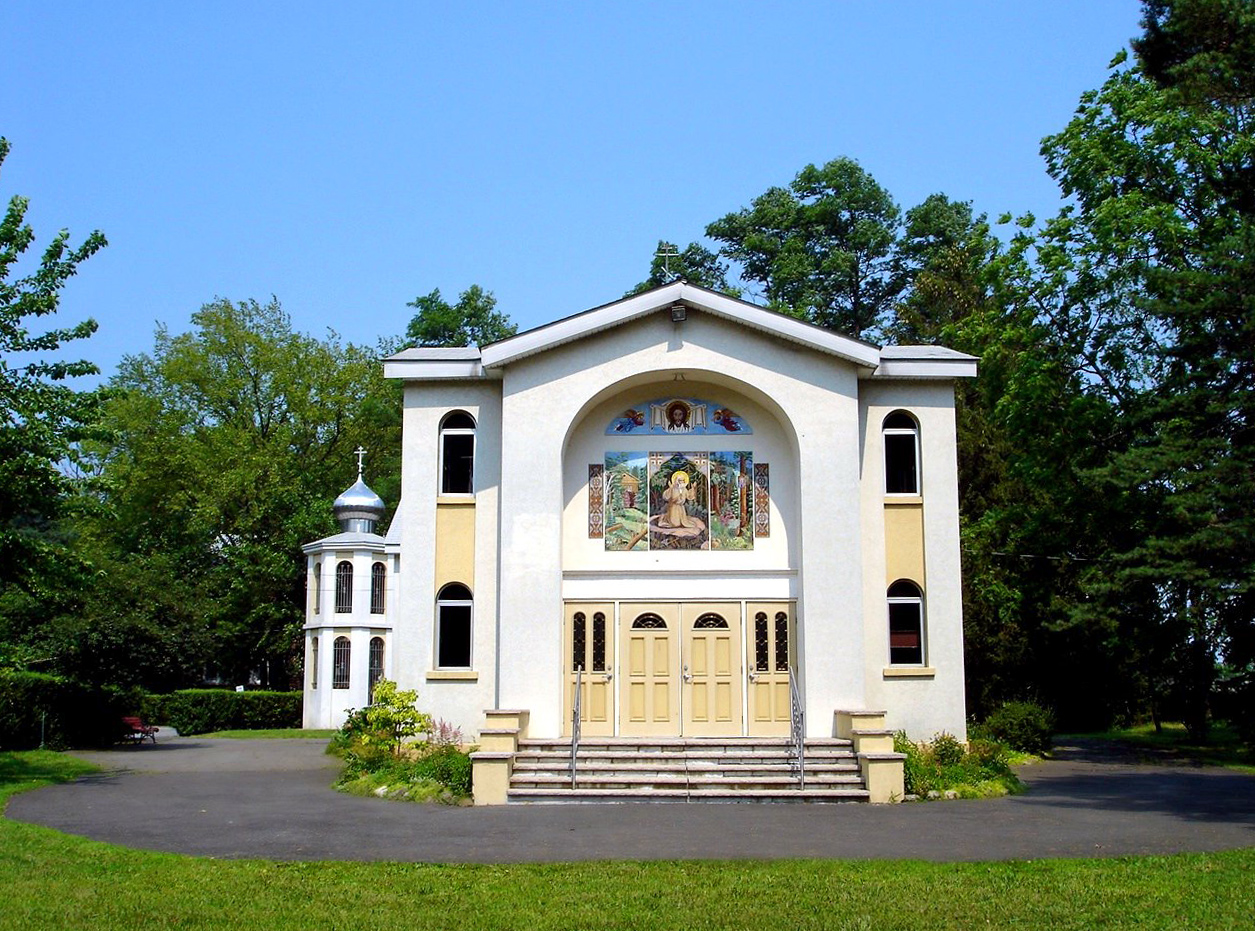
Novo-Diveevo

Novo-Diveevo Convent (it is often spelled as Novo-Diveyevo, Novo-Diveievo or Novodiveevo, Russian: Ново-Дивеево - "New Diveyevo") is a female monastic community in Nanuet, Rockland County, New York in the United States, that was founded in 1949. It is under the auspices of the Russian Orthodox Church Outside Russia. It is also called the Stavropighial Convent of the Holy Dormition. Locally it is simply called Diveevo.

== Cemetery ==
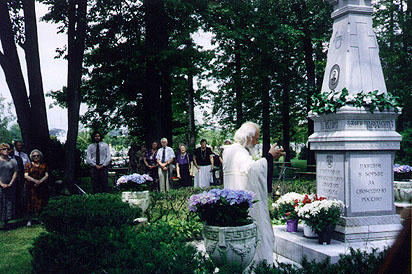
Monument to the Russian Liberation Army

The Convent is home to one of the largest Russian Orthodox Christian Cemeteries in the United States. There are over 8,000 graves divided into 5 areas.

- A monument is placed in remembrance for the Russian Liberation Army who fought in World War II against the Soviet Union.
- Prince Georgy Konstantinovich of Russia, second cousin of the last Russian Tsar Nicholas II of Russia.
- Princess Vera Constantinovna of Russia, second cousin of the last Russian Tsar.
- Lidiia Alekseeva, Russian-Latvian émigré writer and poet.
- Pavel Bermondt-Avalov, General in the Imperial Russian Army during World War I and in the White Army during the Russian Civil War.
- Alexander Bogolepov (1886 – 1980) exiled Russian theologian and religious writer
- Tetos Demetriades, a Greek vinyl record pioneer.
- Andrey Dikiy, a famous Russian Historian and documentalist, who also fought with the White Russian Army.
- Roman Gul, a Russian émigré writer who was prominent in the White Movement.
- Vsevolod K. Gurevich, artist and cartoonist.
- Michael Karpovich, a Russian-American historian of Russia and is remembered as one of the fathers of Slavic Studies in America.
- Margarita Khitrovo, a friend and companion of Tsar Nicholas and Alexandra's daughter Olga.
- Vasily Konovalenko, Russian sculptor, known for his gem carvings
- Boris Koverda, known for the assassination of Pyotr Voykov in Poland.
- Maria Kurenko, notable Metropolitan Opera House singer.
- Plato Malozemoff, chairman and chief executive of the Newmont Mining Corporation.
- Gregory V. Mesniayev (Mesniaeff), noted White Russian author, literary critic, and publicist. Past President of the Pushkin Society in America.
- Sofia Panina, the Vice Minister of State Welfare and Vice Minister of Education in the Russian Provisional Government following the February Revolution (overthrown by the Bolsheviks in the October Revolution).
- Igor Pantuhoff, famous artist and painter, known for his light-hearted style.
- Alexander Rodzyanko was one of leaders of the White movement in Russia. Member of the elite Chevalier Guard regiment. He was a great promoter of equestrian sport in the United States, participated at the Olympic games in Stockholm in 1912 with the Russian jumping team.
- Anatoly Rogozhin, officer in the Imperial Russian Army during World War I and in the White Army during the Russian Civil War.
- Alexander Siloti, a Russian pianist, conductor and composer.
- Seraphim Slobodskoy, was a priest who is noted for creating educational books of Orthodox youth, Law of God.
- Olga Spessivtseva, Russian Ballerina.
- Nicholas Teliatnikow, a photo journalist who was known to record White emigre activity.
- Alexandra Tolstaya, the daughter of the writer and founder of the Tolstoy Foundation.
- Ilya Andreyevich Tolstoy, was President F.D. Roosevelt's envoy in Tibet. He was one of the founders of Marineland of Florida, of the Bahamas National Trust.
- Michael Alexandrovich Verbov, Russian artist, remembered as the portrait painter of famous kings and U.S. presidents.
- Elena Wrangel, daughter of Baron Pyotr Wrangel.
- Vladimir Yourkevitch, was a Russian naval engineer, developer of the modern design of ship hulls, and designer of the famous ocean liner SS Normandie.
- Irina Lomasney, born Chavchavadze, served in the Canadian Navy in WWII, worked for the Tolstoy Foundation in 1970s. She was born in Yalta in 1920, died in Montreal on February 10, 2015. Buried on February 16, 2015.

== Abbots ==
The head of the Convent is Abbess Makaria.

== Gallery ==
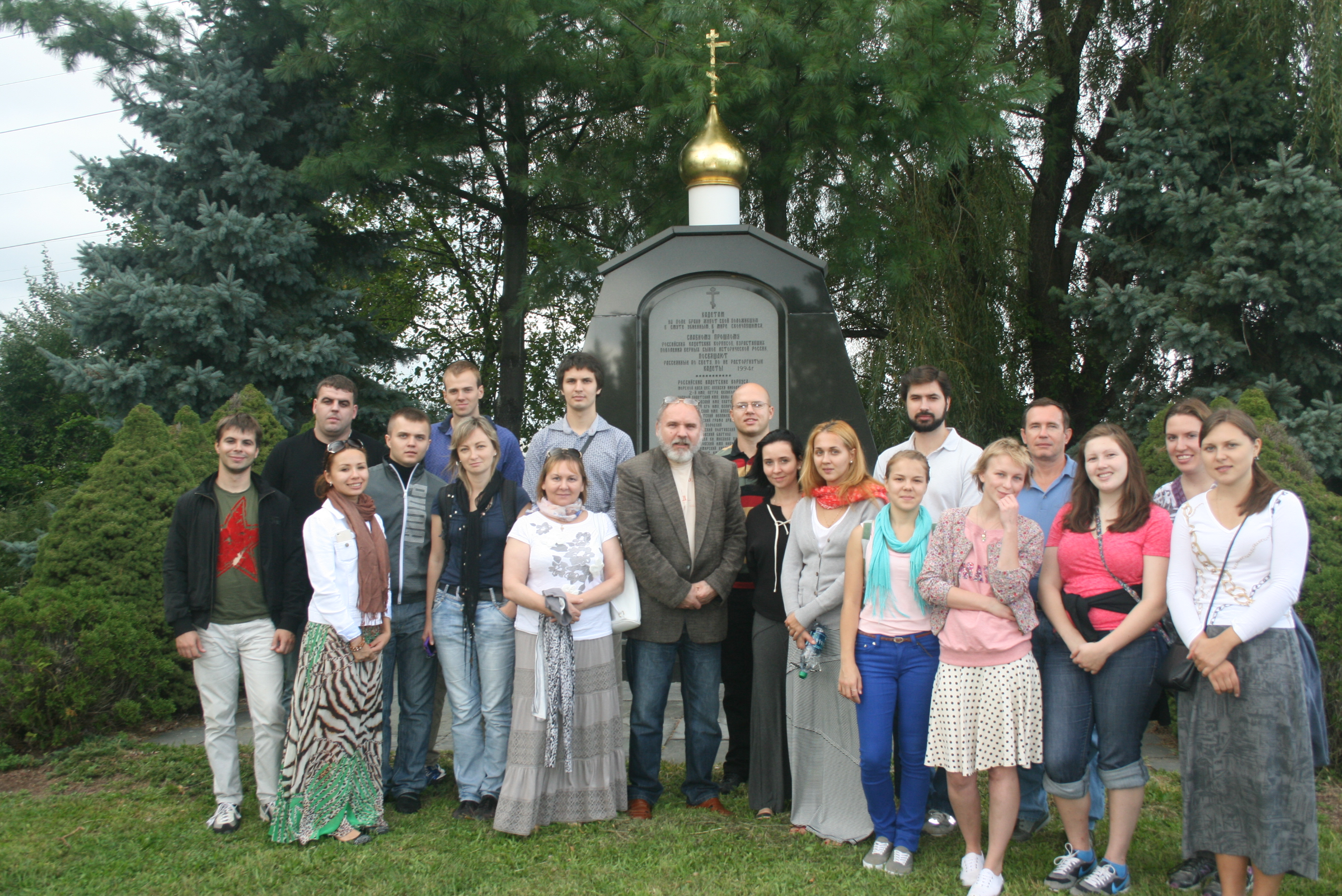
Students of the New York universities at the Novo-Diveevo Monastery

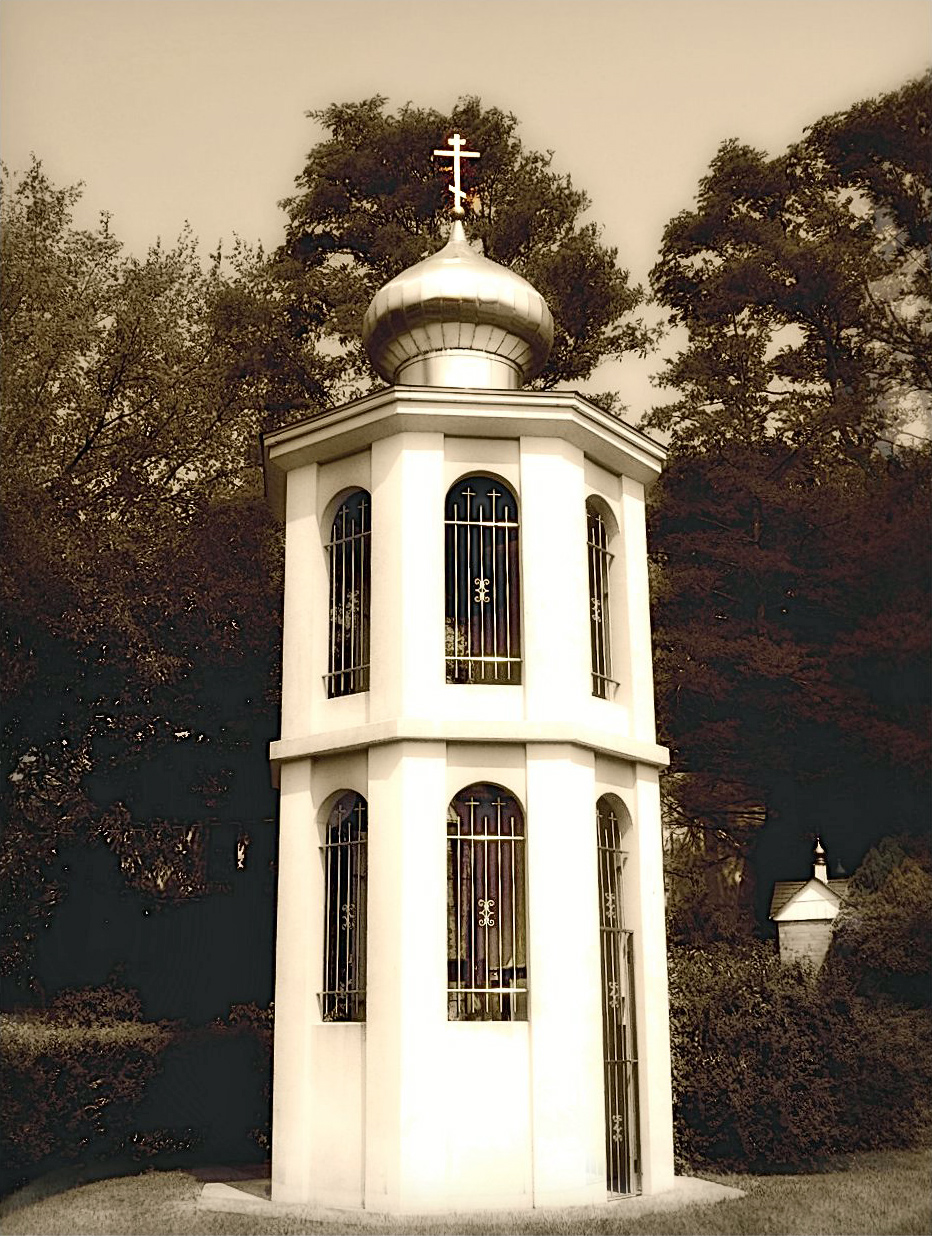
Bell tower

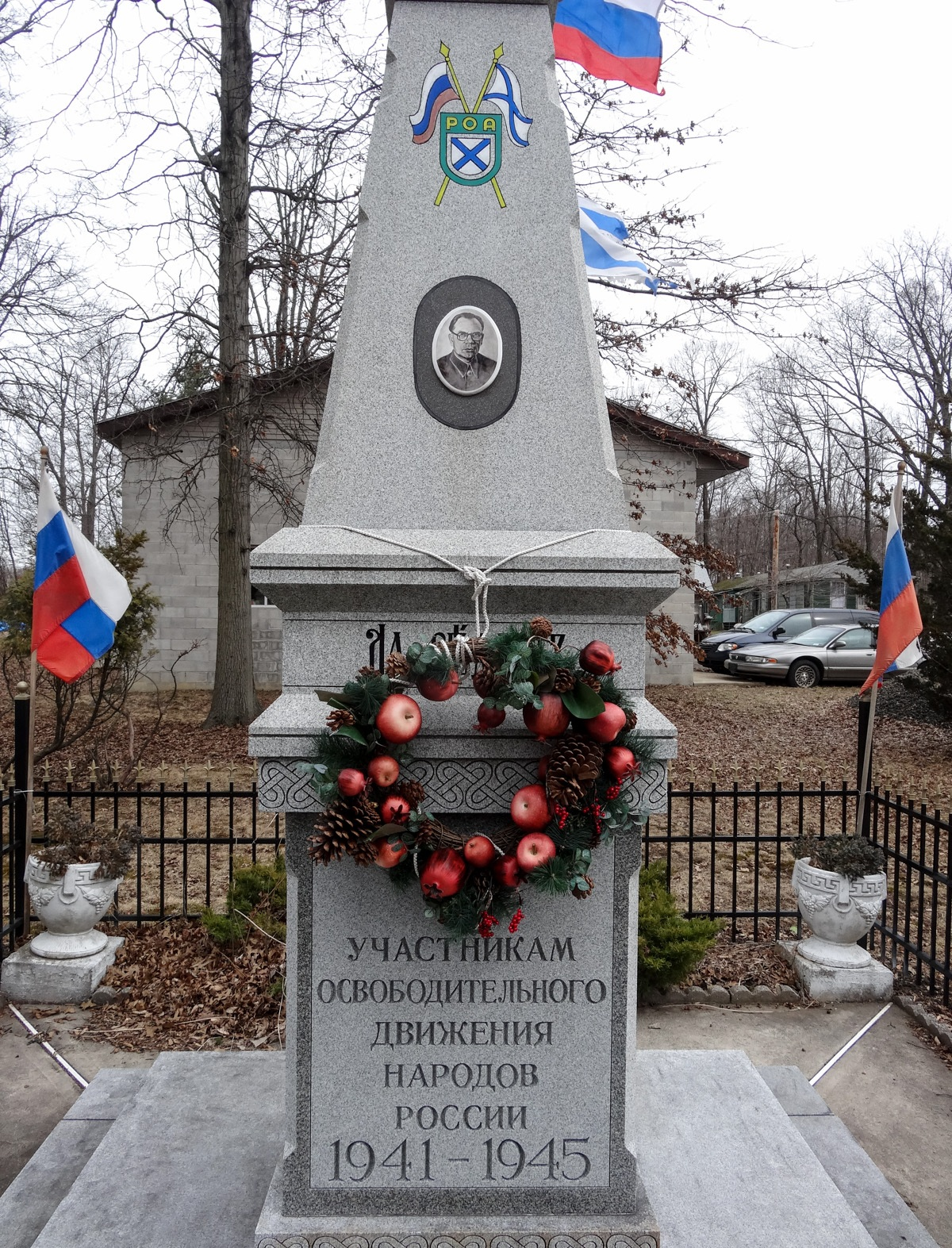
Monument to the Russian Liberation Army

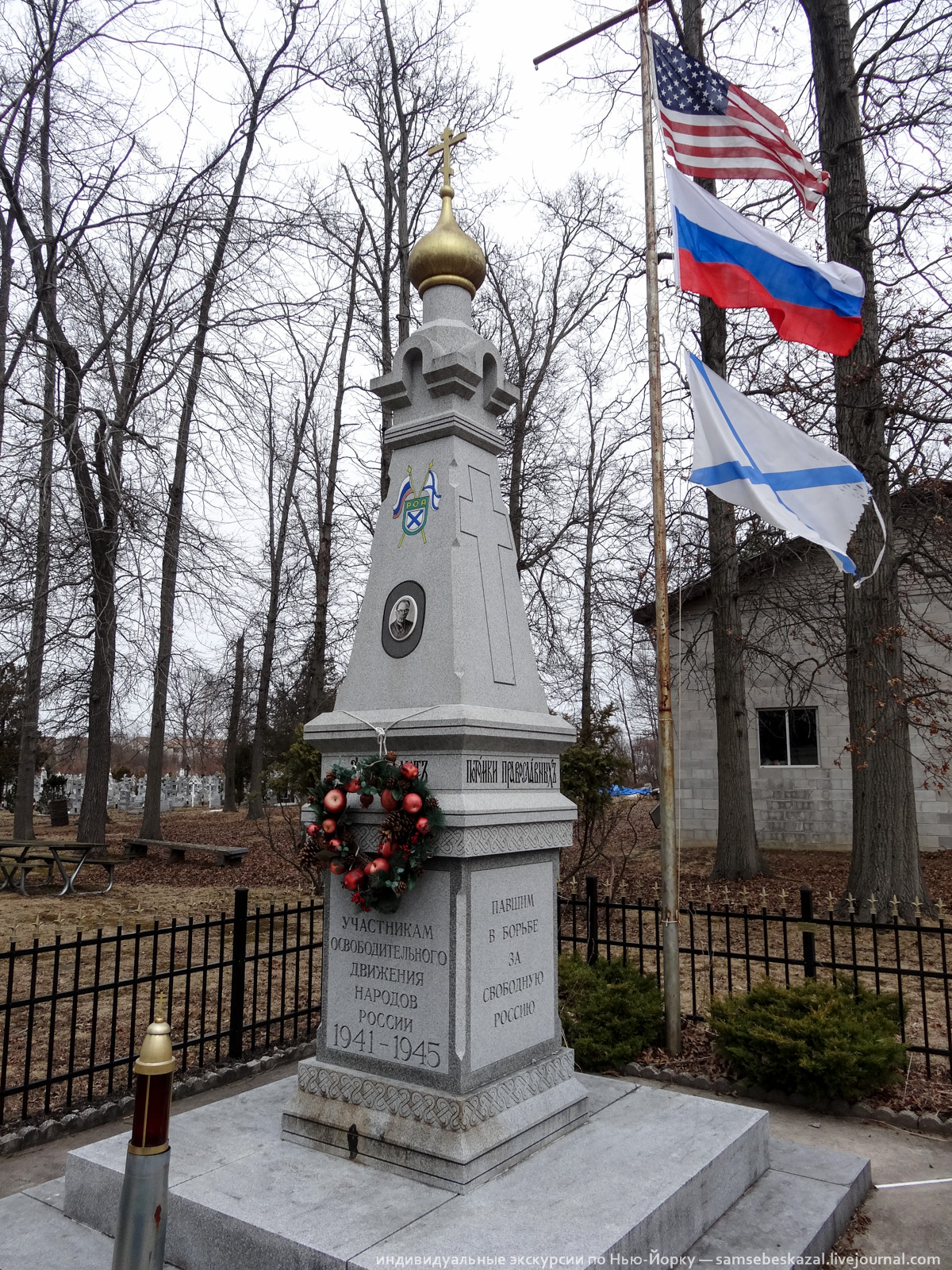
Monument to the Russian Liberation Army
