= Lidiia Alekseeva =

Latvian poet (1909–1989)

- Лидия Алексеева; Lidija Aleksejeva
- Born: Lidiia Alekseevna Devel; March 7, 1909; Dvinsk, Vitebsk Governorate, Russian Empire (now Daugavpils, Latvia)
- Died: October 27, 1989 (aged 80); New York, United States
- Resting place: Novo-Diveevo, New York State, United States
- Other name: Lidiia Alekseevna Alekseeva Lidiya Alekseeva Lidija Devele
- Education: Faculty of Philosophy, University of Belgrade
- Known for: Poet; Short story author; Book reviewer
- Notable work: Lesnoe solntse V puti Prozrachny sled Vremya razluk
- Relatives: Anna Akhmatova

Lidiia Alekseevna Alekseeva (Latvian: Lidija Aleksejeva, Russian: Лидия Алексеевна Алексеева), née Devel (Latvian: Lidija Devele, Russian: Лидия Алексеевна Девель, 1909–1989) was a Russian-Latvian émigré poet and writer of short stories. She was among the group of Russians who were forced to emigrate from the country after the rise of Bolshevism. Her writing reflects this hardship but also contains hints of optimism and beauty. Alekseeva was also a teacher, translator and book reviewer.

== Biography ==
Alekseeva was born in Dvinsk, Russia (now Daugavpils, Latvia) in 1909 to a small military family. Her father, Aleksei Viktorovich Devel (1886–1967), was a Russian naval officer from a family of French origins - and his ancestry can be traced back to a French émigré (possibly Huguenot) from the Napoleonic era. Aleseeva's mother Claudia was a close relative of Anna Akhmatova. Whilst living in Sevastopol, Crimea as a child after her father was commissioned to serve there shortly after her birth, Alekseeva began writing poetry at the age of 7.

The arrival of Bolshevism in 1917 forced Alekseeva and her family to emigrate from Crimea in 1920. They first settled in Turkey, later moving to Bulgaria and then Belgrade, Yugoslavia. Whilst here, she attended the Russian gimnazium and later the Faculty of Philosophy of the University of Belgrade, graduating with a specialism in Slavistics. After graduating, Alekseeva taught Serbian language and literature in Russian high school.

She lived in Yugoslavia until the early 1940s (or 1944, when Soviet troops entered Belgrade), then moved with her husband, mother and step-father to Austria, and finally moved to the United States together with her mother in 1949. Alekseeva's father remained in Belgrade and died there in 1967. Her husband Ivannikov, a prose writer, remained in Belgrade and died there in September 1986. Whilst in the United States, Alekseeva worked in a glove factory and in the Slavonic Division of the New York Public Library until she retired in 1978. After her death in 1989, she was buried in the Novo-Diveevo Cemetery. Shortly after, her preserved archive was burned by the owner of the apartment building in which she had lived.

== Writing ==
Alekseeva began publishing poetry in the 1930s when she was in her early 20s. Her writing was first published under her maiden name, but she later used the pseudonym Alekseeva. Her first publications appeared in prestigious émigré journals such as Grani, Vozrozhdenie, Novyi Zhurnal, Mosty, and Sovremennik. Several collections of her poetry were published between 1954 and 1980.

Alekseeva was a lyric poet who utilised extended metaphor. She wrote in a traditional fashion, not needing to turn to experimental techniques to enhance the emotionalism of her poetry. She wrote on themes of loneliness, human cruelty and destructiveness, but also acceptance and resignation. She wrote about her childhood memories of the Crimea and the countries where exile led her. Whilst her works often depicted despair, there are glimmers of optimism in her descriptions of the beauty of nature. Her first volume of poetry, Lesnoe solntse (1954), explores the theme of nature and life in spite of suffering. Alongside poetry, Alekseeva also published lyrical prose miniatures. Her short stories were published in periodicals and the anthology Humor and Satire of Post-Revolutionary Russia (1983).

Alekseeva was also a translator, translating the works of Croatian writer Ivan Gundulić into Russian, and a book reviewer. She was related to fellow poet Anna Akhmatova, who was an admirer of Alekseeva's writing.

== Selected works ==
=== Poetry volumes ===
- Lesnoe solntse (1954, Forest Sun)
- V puti (1959, On the Road)
- Prozrachny sled (1964, The Transparent Vestige)
- Vremya razluk (1971, The Time of Partings)

=== Translations ===
- Slezy bludnogo syna (1965, epic verse by Ivan Gundulic translated from Croatian into Russian)

=== Book reviews ===
- Sinii mir by Nonna Belavina, Stikhi by Oleg Il'inskii, Uzelok by A. Vasil'kovskaia – reviewed in Novyi zhurnal
