= Two Hundred Years Together =

Book by Aleksandr Solzhenitsyn

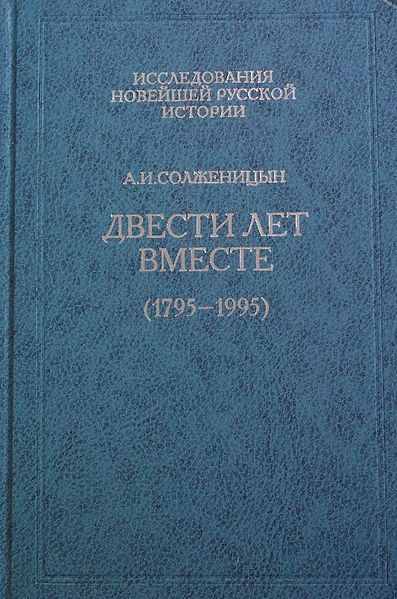
- Book cover of Two Hundred Years Together
- Author: Aleksandr Solzhenitsyn
- Translator: (none) English
- Language: Russian
- Publication date: 2002
- Publication place: Russia
- ISBN: 978-5-9697-0372-8

Two Hundred Years Together (Russian: Двести лет вместе, Dvesti let vmeste) is a two-volume historical essay by Aleksandr Solzhenitsyn. It was written as a comprehensive history of Jews in the Russian Empire, the Soviet Union and modern Russia between the years 1795 and 1995, especially with regard to government attitudes toward Jews.

Solzhenitsyn published this two-volume work on the history of Russian–Jewish relations in 2001 and 2002. The book stirred controversy, and many historians criticized it as unreliable in factual data and antisemitic. The book was published in French and German in 2002–2003. A partial English translation is found in "The Solzhenitsyn Reader". A full English translation is planned for release in 2028; in the meantime The Aleksandr Solzhenitsyn Center commented that unauthorized English translations online are "often poorly and loosely translated; and redact passages, and indeed whole chapters".

== Summary ==
In the first volume, Solzhenitsyn discusses the history of Russians and the 100,000 Jews that came under Russian control between 1772, after the First Partition of Poland and the Russian Revolution in 1917. He asserts that the anti-Jewish pogroms in the Russian Empire were not government-sponsored but spontaneous acts of violence, except for some government culpability in the Pale of Settlement. Solzhenitsyn says that life for Russian Jews was hard but no harder than life for Russian peasants. The second volume covers the post-revolution era up to 1970 when many Jews left Russia for Israel and western countries. Solzhenitsyn says that the Jews who participated in Russian revolutions were effectively apostates splitting from the spirit of tradition. Solzhenitsyn emphatically denies that Jews were responsible for the revolutions of 1905 and 1917. At the end of chapter nine, Solzhenitsyn denounces "the superstitious faith in the historical potency of conspiracies" that leads some to blame the Russian revolutions on the Jews and to ignore the "Russian failings that determined our sad historical decline."

Solzhenitsyn criticizes the "scandalous" weakness and "unpardonable inaction" that prevented the Russian Tsarist state from adequately protecting the lives and property of its Jewish subjects. But he claims that the pogroms were in almost every case organized from "below" and not by the Russian state authorities. He criticizes the "vexing," "scandalous", and "distressing" restrictions on the civil liberties of Jewish subjects during the final decades of the Russian Empire. On that score, in chapter ten of the work he expresses his admiration for the efforts of Pyotr Stolypin (Prime Minister of Russia from 1906 until 1911) to eliminate all legal disabilities against Jews in Russia.

In the spirit of his 1974 essay "Repentance and Self-Limitation in the Life of Nations", Solzhenitsyn calls for the Russians and Russian Jews alike to take responsibility for the "renegades" in both communities who supported a totalitarian and terrorist regime after 1917. At the end of chapter 15, he writes that Jews must answer for the "revolutionary cutthroats" in their ranks just as Russians must repent "for the pogroms, for...merciless arsonist peasants, for...crazed revolutionary soldiers." It is not, he adds, a matter of answering "before other peoples, but to oneself, to one's conscience, and before God."

Solzhenitsyn also takes the anti-Communist White Movement to task for condoning violence against Jews and thus undermining "what would have been the chief benefit of a White victory" in the Russian Civil War: "a reasonable evolution of the Russian state."

== Reception ==
According to Zinaida Gimpelevich, the reception of Two Hundred Years Together has been оverwhelmingly negative. Historian Yohanan Petrovsky-Shtern of Northwestern University published a refutation of Solzhenitsyn's claims and has accused him of outright antisemitism. On the other hand, historians such as Geoffrey Hosking and Robert Service defended Solzhenitsyn against his opponents. Service argued that Solzhenitsyn is very far from the antisemitism of the extreme Russian Right and addresses this issue in a moderate and responsible manner.

Critics focus on Solzhenitsyn's insistence that Jews were as much perpetrators as victims in the Communist repression and that both Russians and Jews need to acknowledge their share of sin. Questions related to Jewish participation in the three Revolutions have been controversial. Vassili Berezhkov, a retired KGB colonel and historian of the secret services and the NKVD (the precursor of the KGB), said that: "The question of ethnicity did not have any importance either in the revolution or the story of the NKVD. This was a social revolution and those who served in the NKVD and Cheka were serving ideas of social change. If Solzhenitsyn writes that there were many Jews in the NKVD, it will increase the passions of anti-semitism, which has deep roots in Russian history. I think it is better not to discuss such a question now." Others feel that Jews were not implicated enough to warrant a reference to Russian antisemitism, or that any notion of the collective responsibility should be avoided.

Solzhenitsyn asserted that Jews were overrepresented in the early Bolshevik leadership and the security apparatus, without citing his sources. He wrote that "from 20 ministers in the first Soviet government one was Russian, one Georgian, one Armenian and 17 Jews". This assertion has been discredited, as the number of Commissars in the first Soviet government on 7 November 1917 was 15, not 20, of whom 11 were ethnic Russians (Milyutin, Yelizarov, Skvortsov-Stepanov, Lomov, Rykov, Lenin, Lunacharsky, Shlyapnikov, Nogin, Krylenko and Avilov), two Ukrainians (Antonov-Ovseyenko and Dybenko), one Pole (Teodorovich), and only one Jew (Trotsky).

Solzhenitsyn stated: "I had to bury many comrades at the front, but not once did I have to bury a Jew". He also stated that according to his personal experience, Jews had a much easier life in the GULAG camps that he was interned in.

=== Richard Pipes review ===
The book has been described by historian Richard Pipes of Harvard University as "a conscious effort to show empathy for both sides", and exonerating Jews for responsibility for the revolution: "No, in no way can it be said that Jews 'made' the revolution of 1905 or 1917 as it was not made by another nation taken as a whole." At the same time Pipes writes that Solzhenitsyn is "too eager to exonerate czarist Russia of mistreating its Jewish subjects, and as a consequence is insensitive to the Jews' predicament". In Richard Pipes' opinion, the book absolves Solzhenitsyn from the taint of antisemitism, although he thinks the author's nationalism prevents him from being fully impartial, and that Solzhenitsyn is using outdated and inadequate sources. Pipes asserts that Solzhenitsyn failed to consider the "poisonous atmosphere in which Jews lived for generations in the Russian empire (an atmosphere originating in Russian Orthodox and nationalist circles)".

=== Yohanan Petrovsky-Shtern critique ===
Solzhenitsyn was accused by the Northwestern University historian Yohanan Petrovsky-Shtern of using unreliable and manipulated figures while ignoring evidence unfavorable to his own point of view and, in particular, ignoring numerous publications of reputable authors in Jewish history. Petrovsky-Shtern says that Solzhenitsyn claims that Jews promoted alcoholism among the peasantry, flooded the retail trade with contraband, and "strangled" the Russian merchant class in Moscow. He says that according to Solzhenitsyn, Jews are non-producing people ("непроизводительный народ") and refuse to engage in factory labor. They are averse to agriculture and unwilling to till the land either in Russia, in Argentina, or in Palestine, and the author blames the Jews' own behavior for pogroms. He says that Solzhenitsyn also claims that Jews used Kabbalah to tempt Russians into heresy, seduced Russians with rationalism and fashion, provoked sectarianism and weakened the financial system, committed murders on the orders of qahal authorities, and exerted undue influence on the prerevolutionary government. Petrovsky-Shtern summarizes his critique by stating that "200 Years Together is destined to take a place of honor in the canon of russophone antisemitica."

=== Semyon Reznik review ===
A critical analysis was published by the Russian-American historian Semyon Reznik. According to Reznik, Solzhenitsyn is careful in his vocabulary, generous in compliments toward Jews and maintains a neutral tone throughout, but at the same time he not only condones repressive measures against Jews, but justifies them as intended for protection of the rights of Russians as the titular nation that supposedly "greatly suffered from Jewish exploitation, alcohol mongering, usury and corruption of the traditional way of life".

=== Other critiques ===
Historian and demographer Sergey Maksudov referred to THYT as "a piece of pseudoscientific essayism", which promulgates numerous antisemitic stereotypes of Jews as professional parasites, infiltrators into the Russian culture, and portrays repressive policies toward Jews as being "in Jews' own interests". Maksudov also claims that Solzhenitsyn was insensitive toward Jewish sufferings during pogroms in general, and the Kishinev pogrom in particular, and also accuses Solzhenitsyn of denying many well documented atrocities.

John Klier, a historian at University College London, describes the charges of antisemitism as "misguided", but at the same time writes that in his account of the pogroms of the early 20th century, Solzhenitsyn is far more concerned with exonerating the good name of the Russian people than he is with the suffering of the Jews, and he accepts the Tsarist government's canards blaming the pogroms on provocations by the Jews themselves.

A detailed analysis of THYT and an overview of critical opinion thereon was published by the University of Waterloo professor Zinaida Gimpelevich. According to Gimpelevich, the critical opinion worldwide overwhelmingly tilts against Solzhenitsyn.

Grigory Baklanov, a Russian novelist, in his critical study described Two Hundred Years as "worthless as historical scholarship". Baklanov, himself a World War II veteran, focuses on Solzhenitsyn's insistence on Jews' supposed wartime cowardice and unwillingness to face the enemy, which he says is contradicted both by the statistics of Jewish frontline casualties and by the high number of Jews decorated for bravery in battle.

Literary historian Leonid Katsis accuses Solzhenitsyn of numerous manipulated and selective quotations in the first volume of the book, detrimental to its trustworthiness. Cultural historian and comparatist Elisa Kriza discusses THYT in an article about antisemitism in Solzhenitsyn's works and explains how Solzhenitsyn's accusations towards Jewish people as a group and his treatment of Russian Jews as "foreign", despite being in Russia for two hundred years, are evidence of antisemitic rhetoric in the book.

Historians Leybelman, Levinskaya, and Abramov claim that Solzhenitsyn uncritically used writings of antisemitic pseudo-historian Andrey Dikiy for his inflated statistical data of Jewish participation in the early Soviet government and its security apparatus.

Mark Deutch, in a two-part review titled "A Shameless Classic" ("Бесстыжий классик"), lists numerous drawbacks, stemming, in his opinion, from biased exposition, ignoring well-known sources, self-contradictions, and factual errors.
