= Leopold H. Haimson =

American historian (1927–2010)

Leopold Haimson
- Born: 1927; Brussels, Belgium
- Died: December 18, 2010 (aged 83); New York, United States
- Other name: Leopold Henri Haimson
- Citizenship: Belgian, American

Academic background
- Education: Harvard University
- Academic advisor: Michael Karpovich

Leopold Henri Haimson (1927 – December 18, 2010) was a Belgian-born American historian whose work focused on the history of the Soviet Union. For most of his career he taught at Columbia University.

Haimson was born in Brussels to Russian émigré parents. In 1940, fleeing the Nazi invasion, the Haimson family escaped first to France and then to the United States, where they would settle. Enrolling at Harvard University at the precocious age of 15 (by his own admission, by lying about his age), he stayed at the same institution until he received his PhD in 1952. He was a member of faculty at the University of Chicago from 1956. He joined the faculty at Columbia in 1965 as a professor of Russian history and a member of the Russian Institute. He was the Director of the Interuniversity Project on the History of Menshevik Movement and a Fellow at the Center for Advanced Study in the Behavioral Sciences at Stanford University. He published many books and articles, specializing in the history of Russia, particularly the Mensheviks movement.

== Publications ==
- The Russian Marxists and the Origins of Bolshevism (Cambridge, MA: Harvard University Press, 1955).
- The Parties and the State: The Evolution of Political Attitudes (Bobbs-Merrill, 1960)
- The making of a workers' revolution: Russian social democracy, 1891–1903 (University of Chicago Press, 1967) with Allan K. Wildman
- The Mensheviks: From the Revolution of 1917 to the Second World War (University of Chicago Press, 1974) with David Dallin
- The Mensheviks: From the Revolution of 1917 to the Second World War (1975) with G. Vakar
- The Politics of Rural Russia, 1905–1914 (1979)
- The Making of Three Russian Revolutionaries: Voices from the Menshevik Past (1987) with Ziva Galili Y Garcia & Richard Wortman
- Russia's Revolutionary Experience, 1905-1917: Two Essays (Columbia University Press, 2005)
- "The Problem of Social Stability in Urban Russia, 1905-1917 (Part One)" Slavic Review (1964) 23#4 pp 619–642 in JSTOR; "The Problem of Social Stability in Urban Russia, 1905-1917 (Part Two)." Slavic Review 24.1 (1965): 1-22. in JSTOR
  - "'The Problem of Political and Social Stability in Urban Russia on the Eve of War and Revolution' Revisited." Slavic Review (2000) pp: 848-875. in JSTOR
- with Charles Tilly. "Strikes, wars, and revolutions in an international perspective." in Tilly, ed., Strike Waves in The Late Nineteenth and Early Twentieth Centuries (1989).
- Strikes, Social Conflict, and the First World War: An International Perspective
- "Lenin's Revolutionary Career Revisited: Some Observations on Recent Discussions." Kritika: Explorations in Russian and Eurasian History 5.1 (2004): 55-80.
