= Michael Karpovich =

Russian-American historian (1888–1959)

Mikhail Karpovich
- Михаил Карпович
- Born: 3 August 1888; Tiflis, Tiflis Governorate, Russian Empire (Note: now Tbilisi, Georgia)
- Died: 7 November 1959 (aged 71); Cambridge, Massachusetts, U.S.
- Resting place: Novo-Diveevo Cemetery
- Other name: Michael Karpovich

Academic background
- Education: Imperial Moscow University
- Thesis: Александр I и Священный союз

Academic work
- Institutions: Harvard University
- Doctoral students: Richard Pipes; Leopold Haimson; Oliver Radkey; Marc Raeff; Martin Malia

Mikhail Mikhailovich Karpovich (Russian: Михаил Михайлович Карпович; 3 August 1888 – 7 November 1959), known in English as Michael Karpovich, was a Russian and American historian of Russia and one of the fathers of Slavic studies in the United States.

== Early life ==
Mikhail Mikhailovich Karpovich was born on 3 August 1888, in Tiflis in the Russian Empire. (Note: today the capital of Georgia) He was of mixed Russian, Polish, and Georgian ancestry. He became active in the Socialist Revolutionary Party (PSR) from 1904 to 1907; he was arrested and held briefly in December 1905, then arrested again and held for a month before being released without having been brought to trial. As a condition of his release he was forbidden from living further in Georgia. In later years Karpovich's politics moved to the center, approximating those of the Constitutional Democratic Party ("Cadets"). Throughout his life Karpovich remained a Christian and a member of the Russian Orthodox Church. Following the failure of the 1905 Russian Revolution, Karpovich emigrated to France, enrolling at the Sorbonne where he studied the history of Europe and of the Eastern Roman Empire. In 1908 he returned to Russia and enrolled at Moscow University for a second time, to study history. There he attended the lectures of the legendary historian Vasilii Kliuchevsky. In 1914 he presented an essay on "Alexander I and the Holy Alliance", for which he received a diploma as a Candidate of History with first class honors.

During the first two years of World War I, Karpovich worked as an assistant at the Historical Museum of Moscow, but he was drawn into the war effort in 1916. He was assigned to the Ministry of War with the task of coordinating industrial production for the needs of the front.

Following the February Revolution of 1917 Karpovich went to work for the new Provisional Government. He met Boris A. Bakhmetev, future American Ambassador of Alexander Kerensky's government by chance on the Nevsky Prospect of Petrograd. Bakhmetev persuaded Karpovich to join him on a "special mission" to America as his personal secretary. In May 1917 the pair left Russia for Washington, D.C., where they established the Provisional Government's Embassy to the United States. Karpovich joined Bakhmetev with the understanding that his stay in the United States would be temporary and that he would be able to return home in time for Christmas of 1917. Historical events intervened.

== Career ==
Karpovich remained in this position of trust at the Russian embassy until the middle of 1922, when he moved to New York City to assist Bakhmetev there. He also lectured on Russian history at a number of universities and made translations during this interval.

In 1927 Karpovich began his long career in the history department of Harvard University in Cambridge, Massachusetts.

From 1946 until his death Karpovich edited the quarterly Novyi Zhurnal (New Magazine), an old school thick journal of serious Russian journalism and fiction. He was also a contributor to The Russian Review from its establishment in 1941, working via three-cornered correspondence with his co-editors, William Henry Chamberlin and Dimitri von Mohrenschildt.

Karpovich planned to join historian George Vernadsky in writing a 10-volume history of Russia, with Vernadsky handling the initial six volumes and Karpovich the final four. The project was begun in 1943, but only Vernadsky's work was completed.

In 1949 Karpovich was named Chairman of the Department of Slavic Languages and Literatures at Harvard. He remained in this position until 1954, when he became Curt Hugo Reisinger Professor of Slavic Languages and Literatures, retaining this title along with that of Professor of History until his retirement in 1957.

== Death and legacy ==
Michael Karpovich died on 7 November 1959, in Cambridge, Massachusetts. He is buried in Novo-Diveevo Cemetery in Nanuet, New York.

Karpovich was honored by former students with the Festschrift, Russian Thought and Politics (1957) He was remembered by historian of Russia William Henry Chamberlin as "a great Russian scholar, equally at home in history and literature" who was "a vital influence on the development of Russian studies in the United States." Chamberlin continued:

"Karpovich embodied in his own personality the finest traits of the pre-war Russian intelligentsia; he was a liberal in the truest and broadest sense of that much abused word. His own ancestry reflected Russian political vicissitudes and the multinational character of the old Russian Empire. One of his forefathers was a banished Polish revolutionary; his birthplace was Tiflis, the picturesque historic capital of Georgia. So he was predisposed both against Russian chauvinism and against the anti-Russianism of some embittered members of the non-Russian nationalities."

== Works ==
=== Books ===
- Imperial Russia. (1932)

=== Contributions ===
Карпович М.М. “Mysli i uroki Mikhaila Karpovicha,” [“The Thoughts and Teachings of Michael Karpovich”] in M.M. Karpovich, Lektsii po intellektual’noi istorii Rossii (xviii-nachalo xx veka), vstup. st. N.G.O. Pereira [Lectures in the Intellectual History of Russia (from the 18th to the beginning of the 20th centuries) introductory essay by N.G.O. Pereira] (Moscow: Russkii put’, 2012), pp. 7–23.

- Economic History of Europe. Contributor. (1937)
- An Encyclopedia of World History. Contributor. (1941)
- Waldemar Gurian (ed.), The Soviet Union: A Symposium. (1951)

=== Books edited ===
P.N. Miliukov, Outlines of Russian Culture. In Three Volumes. (1943)
