= Roman Gul =

Russian writer (1896–1986)

- Роман Борисович Гуль
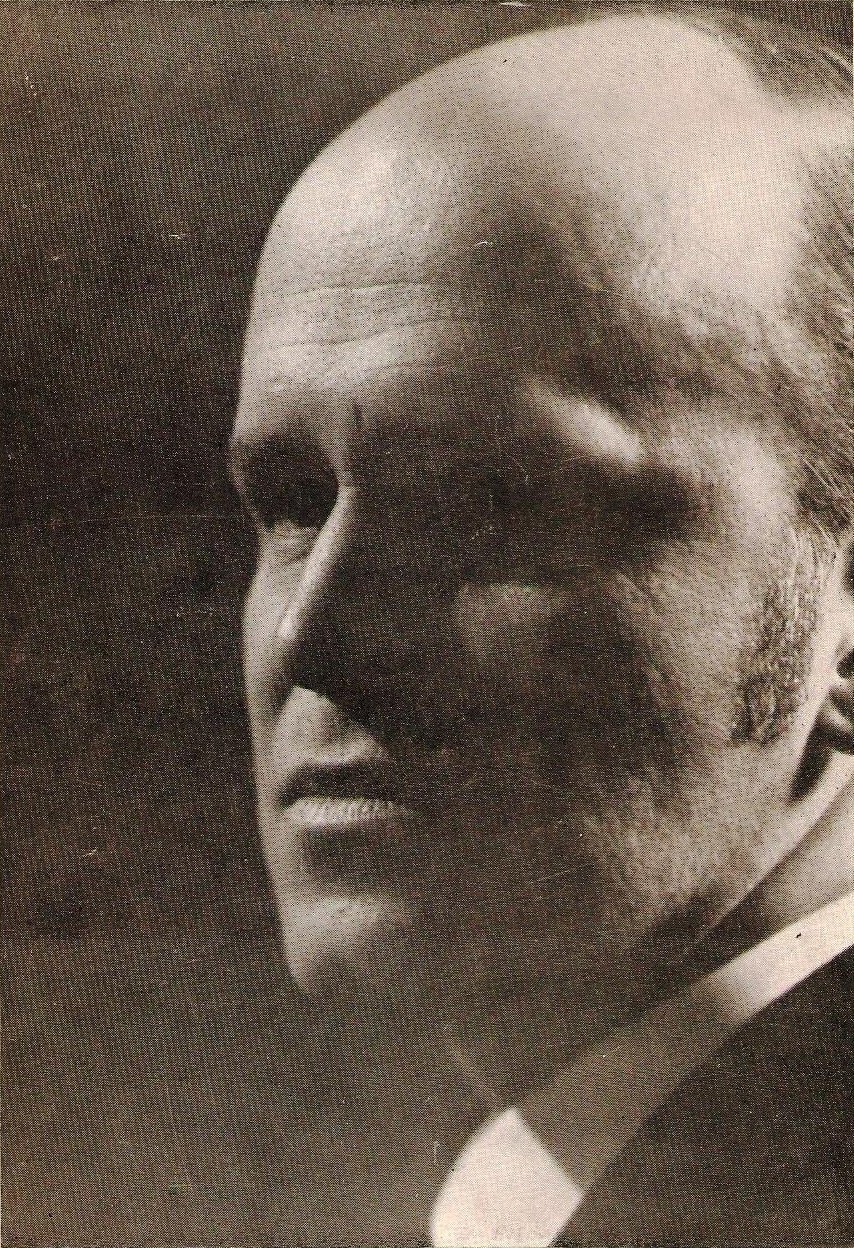
- In 1936
- Born: Roman Borisovich Gul; August 13, 1896; Penza, Russian Empire
- Died: June 30, 1986 (aged 89); New York City, United States
- Resting place: Novo-Diveevo Cemetery, United States
- Writing career
- Language: Russian

Roman Borisovich Gul (Russian: Роман Борисович Гуль; 13 August 1896 – 30 June 1986) was a Russian émigré writer, his political position was leftist-liberal, he was critical towards the conservative, tsarist White Movement.

== Biography ==
Gul was born into the family of a notary and spent his childhood in Penza and on his family estate of Ramsay near Penza. He completed the 1st Penza Gymnasium (grammar school) and went to study at the Law Faculty of the Moscow State University in 1914.

Gul was conscripted into the Imperial Russian Army in 1916 and served with the infantry on the South Western Front becoming a company commander in the 417th Kinburn Regiment.

In 1917, after the October Revolution, Gul joined the Kornilov Shock regiment of the White Volunteer Army. He participated in the Ice March and was wounded. He was captured by the Ukrainian Army and imprisoned in late 1918. In 1919 he was transferred to Germany and settled in Berlin in 1920 becoming a writer.

In the 1920s Gul wrote for the Berlin-based newspaper Nakanunye (Накануне), and acted as a correspondent for several Soviet newspapers. He also worked on the magazines Life (Жизнь), Time (Время), The Russian Emigrant (Русский эмигрант) and Voice of Russia (Голос России).

After the Nazis came to power in 1933, Gul was arrested and put into the Oranienburg concentration camp near Berlin, but was freed after six months and emigrated to Paris. In France, he wrote for the liberal émigré newspaper Posledniye Novosti (Последние новости) and the magazines Illustrirovannaya Rossiya (Иллюстрированнaя Россия), Sovremennye zapiski (Современныe записки). During the Nazi occupation of France, Gul went into hiding and avoided arrest working on a farm in southern France and in a glass factory.

Gul emigrated to the United States in 1950 and worked for the émigré literature magazine Novy Zhurnal becoming chief editor in 1966. Gul died of a lung infection in 1986 and is buried in Novo-Diveevo Cemetery in Spring Valley, New York.

== Works ==
In Russian Language

- Белые по Чёрному: Очерки гражданской войны. - White on Black: Essays on the Civil War. Book
- Ледяной поход (1921) - Ice March (1921)
- В рассеяньи сущие: Повесть из жизни эмиграции 1920—1921. (1923) роман, который политически нейтрально трактует тему возвращения в послереволюционную Россию - The utter scattering: The story of the life of emigration 1920-1921. (1923) novel, which is politically neutral treats the subject returned to post-revolutionary Russia
- Генерал БО. [Азеф] (1929) Роман о Савинкове; перерабатывался несколько раз, в последний раз в 1974 General BO. [Azef] (1929) A novel about Savinkov; Reworked several times, most recently in 1974
- Георгий Иванов. Статья - Georgi Ivanov. Article
- Дзержинский, Менжинский, Петерс, Лацис, Ягода. (1936) - Dzerzhinsky, Menzhinsky, Peters, Lacis, and Yagoda. (1936) Book
- Жизнь на Фукса: Очерки белой эмиграции. (1927) - Life on the Fuchs: Essays on the White emigration. (1927)
- Конь рыжий. (1952) автобиографическое повествование от начала революции и до прибытия в Париж - A Red Horse. (1952) autobiographical account from the beginning of the revolution and before the arrival in Paris
- Красные маршалы: Ворошилов, Буденный, Блюхер, Котовский. (1933) Книга - Red marshals: Voroshilov, Budyonny, Blucher, Kotovsky. (1933) Book
- Ледяной поход (С Корниловым). (1921) Мемуары - Th Ice March (with Kornilov). (1921) Memoirs
- Моя биография. My biography
- Одвуконь: Советская и эмигрантская литература. (1973) Сборник - Odvukon: Soviet and emigre literature. (1973) Collection
- Одвуконь-2: Статьи. (1982) Сборник - Odvukon-2: Articles. (1982) Collection
- Ораниенбург: Что я видел в гитлеровском концентрационном лагере. (1937) - Oranienburg: What I saw in a Nazi concentration camp. (1937)
- Победа Пастернака. (1958) Статья - Victory for Pasternak. (1958) Article
- Скиф. (1931) Роман о Бакунине; в 1958 переработан и издан под названием «Скиф в Европе» Skiff. (1931) A novel about Bakunin; In 1958, revised and published under the title "Skiff in Europe"
- Тухачевский: Красный маршал. (1932) Книга Tukhachevsky: Red marshal. (1932) Book
- Я унёс Россию: Апология эмиграции. Т. 1-3. (1981—1989) I took Russia: Apology emigration. 1-3. (1981-1989)

== Links ==
- Short biography in Russian language
- Archive from Amherst College
- His selected books electronically available at lib.ru (Russian)
