= Andrey Dikiy =

Russian writer and anti-Semitic theorist

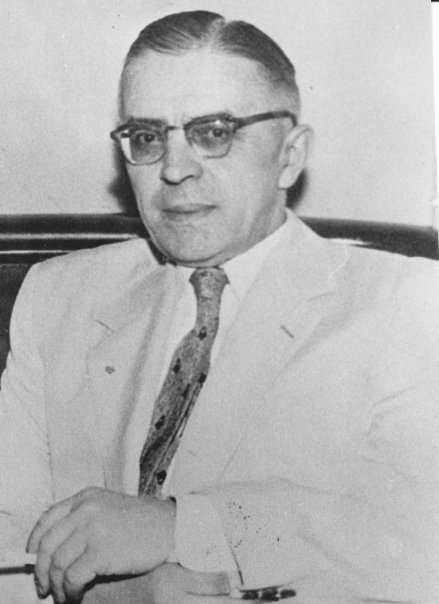
- Born: Andrei Ivanovich Zankevich; February 9, 1895; Gaivoron, Chernigov Governorate, Russian Empire
- Died: September 4, 1977 (aged 82); New York City, U.S.
- Occupations: writer, journalist, historian, political activist
- Writing career
- Genres: Conspirology, Antisemitism

Andrey Ivanovich Dikiy (Russian: Андре́й Ива́нович Ди́кий; Ukrainian: Андрій Іванович Дикий; February 9, 1895 – September 4, 1977), real surname Zankevich (Занке́вич) was a white émigré Russian Nazi collaborator, writer and journalist who served as the Deputy Head of the civilian administration of the Committee for the Liberation of the Peoples of Russia (KONR) and as a volunteer for the Russian Liberation Army (ROA) under Andrey Vlasov. Known for his radical antisemitism and anti-Ukrainian sentiment, Dikiy has been described by Christian essayist Dmitry Talantsev as one of the main theorists of Judeophobia.

== Biography ==
Zankevich was born into a noble family, at the family estate in the village of Gaivoron, in the Chernigov Governorate, 30 km south of Konotop (now in Ukraine). His father was the owner of a large sugar factory and sugar beet plantation. His mother's maiden name was Kandiba. Andrey had three brothers and one sister.

He emigrated to Yugoslavia in the aftermath of the Russian Revolution. There he was active in the anti-Soviet community, and was a member of the executive committee of National Alliance of Russian Solidarists. During World War II, Dikiy volunteered for the Nazi collaborationist Russian Liberation Army, and was deputy head of the personnel department of the Civil Administration of the Committee for the Liberation of the Peoples of Russia.

He moved to the United States after World War II and was a prolific publisher of articles in the Russophone press characterized as pseudo-scientific, antisemitic and anti-Ukrainian.

He died on September 4, 1977, in New York and is buried at the Russian Orthodox cemetery at the Novo-Diveevo Cemetery in Nanuet, New York.

== Alleged Influence on Solzhenitsyn ==
In a 2006 Russian-language book, Евреи в КГБ (Jews in the KGB), Vadim Abramov asserts that “[t]he source of [Alexander] Solzhenitsyn’s encyclopedic knowledge [about the history of Jewish-Russian relations] is…. Andrei Dikiy” (p. 87). It is important to note that Solzhenitsyn never cites nor mentions Dikiy across the two volumes of Two Hundred Years Together. Nevertheless, within the Russosphere, this claim by Abramov gained some traction and resulted in accusations of plagiarism (the use of source material without attribution.) For instance, the Russian language website, Central Jewish Resource, published an article by M. Leybelman on 12 October 2006 in which Leybelman repeats the accusation first made by Abramov and embellishes upon it:

A lot of Dikiy’s books migrated to the two-volume book “Two Hundred Years Together.” Solzhenitsyn rewrote without any verification, thereby violating the immutable rule of any researcher.

Although Leybelman does not provide any citation for this claim (that Solzhenitsyn plagiarized Dikiy), it seems to be based on Abramov's Jews in the KGB, since that book is heavily cited elsewhere in Leybelman's article. Another Russian language website, Internet Jewish Club, published an undated and unattributed article, apparently based on Abramov's allegation that Solzhenitsyn plagiarized Dikiy. This anonymous article expands on Abramov's allegation as follows:

Abramov quotes (p. 83) from Solzhenitsyn: “The ‘soldier leader’ of 1917, Boris Pozern, the commissar of the Petrocommune [Petrograd Soviet], along with Zinoviev and Dzerzhinsky, contributed greatly to the identification of the image of the Jew and the Chekist, and on September 2, 1918, he signed an appeal on the ‘Red Terror.’” Abramov comments: “Pozern was neither a Jew (German) nor a security officer—he never served in the Cheka-NKVD.” This example illustrates this perfectly: the identification of the images of the Jew and the Chekist was “helped a lot” not so much by the real Jewish Chekists, but by their “images” drawn by Shulgin or Dikiy and then replicated by the Solzhenitsyns, Shafareviches, Burovskys and others like them - there are countless of them. Anyone, including Solzhenitsyn, should be ashamed for participating in this dirty business.

The passage of Two Hundred Years Together referenced above, in which Solzhenitsyn points to Boris Pozern as an example of a Jewish commissar who helped to solidify the stereotype of Jews as Chekists in the minds of Russians, is based on Pozern's entry in the Russian Jewish Encyclopedia (1994), wherein Pozern is identified as Jewish, as well as a commissar of the Petrograd Soviet (in addition to a number of other titles he held throughout his political career.)

== Bibliography ==
- Неизвращённая история Украины-Руси: В 2 томах. Нью-Йорк.
- Евреи в России и СССР: Исторический очерк. Нью-Йорк, 1967.
- Русско-еврейский диалог.
