= Yohanan Petrovsky-Shtern =

American Jewish historian

- Йоханан Петровський-Штерн
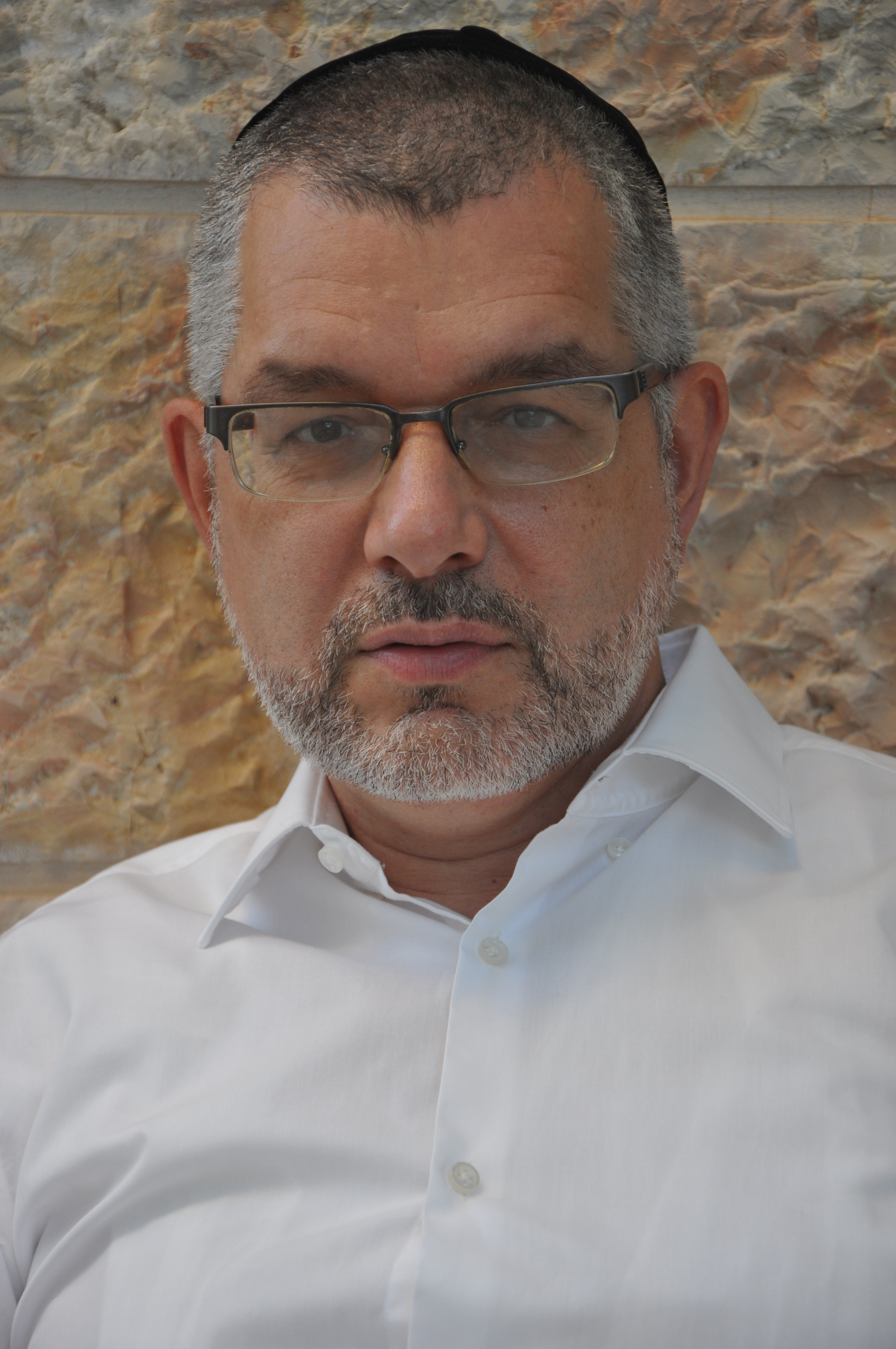
- Born: Ivan Myronovych Petrovsky; April 6, 1962 (age 64); Kiev, Ukrainian SSR, Soviet Union (now Kyiv, Ukraine)
- Other name: Ivan Petrovsky
- Occupations: Historian, Philologist, Academic

Academic background
- Education: Moscow University (PhD); Brandeis University (PhD)
- Doctoral advisor: Antony Polonsky; Moshe (Murray) Rosman; Shaul Stampfer

Academic work
- Discipline: Jewish History and Religion
- Institutions: Northwestern University; Hebrew University of Jerusalem; University of Warsaw; Harvard University

Yohanan Petrovsky-Shtern (Note: Ukrainian: Йоханан Петровський-Штерн, romanized: Yokhanan Petrovskyi-Shtern) (born Ivan Myronovych Petrovsky, (Note: Ukrainian: Іван Миронович Петровський, romanized: Ivan Myronovych Petrovskyi) April 6, 1962) is an American historian, philologist and essayist, noted in particular for his studies of the institution of Cantonism, his critique of Aleksandr Solzhenitsyn's controversial two volume-work about Jews in Russia, Two Hundred Years Together, as well as translations of Jorge Luis Borges' works into Russian. He is the Crown Family Professor of Jewish Studies and a Professor of Jewish History in History Department at Northwestern University where he teaches Early Modern, Modern and East European Jewish history.

== Biography ==
Petrovsky-Shtern was born in Kyiv in 1962 to the family of Miron Petrovsky (Петровський Мирон Семенович), a Ukrainian philologist. His birth name was Ivan Petrovsky, as attested by his published translations of Jorge Luis Borges.

=== Scholar ===
He holds a Doctor of Philosophy (PhD) in Comparative Literature from Moscow University and a second Doctor of Philosophy (PhD) in Jewish History from Brandeis University. He has been a Rothschild Fellow at Hebrew University in Jerusalem, a Sensibar Visiting Professor at Spertus Institute for Jewish Learning and Leadership in Chicago, a Visiting Scholar at École des Hautes Études en Sciences Sociales, a research fellow at The National Endowment for the Humanities, in Poland, and a Fulbright Scholar at Kyiv Mohyla Academy in Kyiv.

=== Scholarship ===
Petrovsky-Shtern’s scholarship focuses on the social, political, and cultural history of Jews in Eastern Europe, particularly in the territories of the Russian Empire, Poland–Lithuania, and Ukraine. His work frequently reexamines established narratives in Jewish historiography through archival research in Russian, Polish, and Ukrainian sources.

In Jews in the Russian Army, 1827–1917: Drafted into Modernity (2009), he studies the institution of Cantonism and the conscription of Jewish youth into the Russian military, arguing that military service played a significant role in shaping modern Jewish identities in the Russian Empire.

In The Anti-Imperial Choice: The Making of the Ukrainian Jew (2009), Petrovsky-Shtern explores the emergence of modern Ukrainian Jewish identity in the nineteenth century, contending that some Jews aligned themselves with Ukrainian national movements rather than with imperial Russian structures.

His book The Golden Age Shtetl: A New History of Jewish Life in East Europe (2015) challenges the traditional depiction of the shtetl as economically stagnant and socially isolated, arguing instead that many Jewish communities in early modern Poland–Lithuania were economically integrated and culturally dynamic.

=== Artist ===
Petrovsky-Shtern had several solo exhibitions, including such venues as the French Institute in July 2019 in Kyiv, Ukraine; the Ukrainian Institute of America in spring 2015 in New York City; Ukrainian Institute of Modern Art in February–March 2014 in Chicago; and in November 2012 at the museum of the Spertus Institute for Jewish Learning and Leadership in Chicago.

Petrovsky-Shtern analyses the folkways and fantasies of his Jewish and Ukrainian heritage through “revisiting foundational narratives from the Hebrew Bible, Eastern European Jewish folk-characters and folk-tales, images and artifacts from his native Ukraine, and—of course—the Holocaust,” wrote Jerome Chanes in Jewish Week.

“Although Petrovsky-Shtern’s main fields of interest are history and literature, ranging from the Jewish Middle Ages to Hasidic folklore, from the prose of Gabriel Garcia Marquez to the Ukrainian renaissance of the 1920s, it is on canvas that the depth of his knowledge of various religions and cultures is transformed into a mysterious world of tales and myths,” wrote the poet Vasyl Makhno.

== Awards ==
- 2016 - The Kosciuszko Visiting Professor at the University of Warsaw, Collegium de Artes Liberales
- 2015 - The American Publishers Awards for Professional and Scholarly Excellence (PROSE Awards), Honorable Mention
- 2014 - Nomination for 2015 Pulitzer Prize for The Golden Age Shtetl
- 2014 - National Jewish Book Award in the History category for The Golden Age Shtetl: A New History of Jewish Life in East Europe
- 2007 - Institute for Advanced Studies at Hebrew University of Jerusalem, Visiting Scholar Fellowship
- 2006 - National Endowment for the Humanities Summer Fellowship
- 2003—2006 - The Davis Center for Russian Studies, Harvard University, Fellow
- 1993 - Research Fellowship, Center for Russian and Eastern European Studies (CREES), University of Toronto

== Publications ==
Among his publications are many scholarly articles and such monographs as:

- Yohanan Petrovsky-Shtern (2009). Jews in the Russian Army, 1827–1917: Drafted into Modernity. Cambridge University Press. ISBN 978-0-52-151573-3.
- Yohanan Petrovsky-Shtern (2009). The Anti-Imperial Choice: The Making of the Ukrainian Jew. Yale University Press. ISBN 978-0-30-013731-6.
- Yohanan Petrovsky-Shtern (2010). Lenin's Jewish Question. Yale University Press. ISBN 978-0-30-015210-4.
- Yohanan Petrovsky-Shtern (2015). The Golden Age Shtetl: A New History of Jewish Life in East Europe. Princeton University Press. ISBN 978-0-69-116851-7., which provided the first grassroots social, economic, and cultural history of the shtetl.
- Yohanan Petrovsky-Shtern; Antony Polonsky, eds. (2014). Polin: Studies in Polish Jewry, Volume 26: Jews and Ukrainians. The Littman Library of Jewish Civilization. ISBN 978-1-90-676420-3.
- Yohanan Petrovsky-Shtern (2015). "Context is Everything. Reflections on Studying with Antony Polonsky". In Glenn Dynner; François Guesnet (eds.). Warsaw. The Jewish Metropolis. Brill Pub. pp. 613–616. doi:10.1163/9789004291812_027. ISBN 978-90-04-29181-2.
- Yohanan Petrovsky-Shtern (2015). "On the Other Side of Despair: Cossacks and Jews in Yuri Kosach's The Day of Rage". In Amelia M. Glaser (ed.). Stories of Khmelnytsky: Competing Literary Legacies of the 1648 Ukrainian Cossack Uprising. Stanford University Press. pp. 182–196. ISBN 978-0-80-479382-7.
- Yohanan Petrovsky-Shtern; Paul Robert Magocsi (2016). Jews and Ukrainians: A Millennium of Co-Existence. University of Toronto Press. ISBN 978-0-77-275111-9.
