= Alexander Bogolepov =

American Russian theologian and professor (1885–1980)

Alexander Aleksandrovich Bogolepov (Russian: Александр Александрович Боголепов) (January 16, 1886 – August 31, 1980) was Russian American theologian and religious writer.

== Biography ==
Bogolepov was an expert in canon law and the history of the church. After the February Revolution he was pro-rector of science of Petrograd University. He was among the first professors singled out by Vladimir Lenin for deportation, and eventually in 1922 he was shipped off into exile to Germany on board of a "Philosophers' ship". He settled in Berlin and also worked in Prague. In March 1945 he moved from Berlin to Western Germany and emigrated to the United States in 1951. He became Professor of Canon Law are Russian and Church Slavonic languages at the Saint Vladimir's Orthodox Theological Seminary, New York.

He was interred in the Novo-Diveevo Russian Cemetery, Nanuet, Rockland County, New York, United States.

== Books ==
- М.М. Ковалевский, как историк политической мысли. Пг., 1916;
- Православные песнопения Рождества, Страстной и Пасхи. Таллин, 1934;
- Церковь под властью коммунизма. Мюнхен, 1958;
- Toward an American Orthodox Church. N. Y., 1963;
- Church Reforms in Russia, 1905-1918. Bridgeport (Connecticut), 1966;
- Рождество, Страстная и Пасха в православном богослужении. Нью-Йорк, 1973.

== Literature ==
- Lesley Chamberlain, Lenin's Private War: The Voyage of the Philosophy Steamer and the Exile of the Intelligentsia, St Martin's Press, 2007; UK: The Philosophy Steamer Lenin and the Exile of the Intelligentsia, Atlantic Books, 2006
