= Marc Raeff =

American historian (1923–2008)

- Марк Исаевич Раев
- Born: July 28, 1923; Moscow, Soviet Union
- Died: September 20, 2008 (aged 85); Teaneck, New Jersey, U.S.
- Citizenship: Soviet, American

Academic background
- Education: Harvard University
- Doctoral advisor: Michael Karpovich

Marc Raeff (Russian: Марк Исаевич Раев; July 28, 1923 – September 20, 2008) was a Soviet-born American historian. For most of his career he taught at Columbia University in New York, where he held the Bakhmeteff chair in Russian studies.

Harvard University historian Richard Pipes says, "He was very much interested in the Western aspect of Russian culture. He was a pillar of Russian historical studies in this country."

== Career ==
Raeff was born in Moscow on July 28, 1923, and was the only child of Isaac and Victoria Raeff. Isaac Raeff was of Jewish heritage, but was not observant. Victoria Raeff's mother was Lutheran, and Victoria attended a Lutheran church in Kharkov as a child. His father was an engineer, and his mother was a biochemical technician. The government sent his father to Berlin to oversee quality control on machinery destined for Russia. They refused to return to Moscow in 1927; in 1933 they moved to Paris. They emigrated to the U.S. in 1941.

Raeff attended schools in German, French and English, but he spoke Russian at home, with his parents. He wrote in English, French, German, and Russian, and also read Italian and Polish.

Raeff served in the U.S. Army in World War II as an interpreter in POW camps. He attended Harvard, working with Professor Michael Karpovich, who trained numerous scholars. He earned his Ph.D. in 1950. He taught at Clark University from 1949 until 1961, when he moved to Columbia. He married Lillian Gottesman in 1951; they had two daughters, Anne and Catherine.

Raeff's research focused on the Russian Empire, with an emphasis on the Russian intelligentsia at home and in diaspora. Wirtschafter argues that he always "stressed the complexity and dynamism of the social and political arrangements that defined Imperial Russia". Raeff directed numerous Ph.D. dissertations. His teaching and writing were free of ideological overtones during and after the Cold War. He was awarded a Guggenheim Fellowship in 1957. He published numerous articles and books.

== Bibliography ==
- Siberia and the Reforms of 1822 (University of Washington Press, 1956)
- Michael Speransky: Statesman of Imperial Russia, 1772–1839 (Martinus Nijhoff, 1957; 2nd ed., 1969)
- Origins of the Russian Intelligentsia: The Eighteenth-Century Nobility (Harcourt, Brace, and World, 1966)
- Imperial Russia, 1682-1825: The Coming of Age of Modern Russia (Knopf, 1971)
- Comprendre l'Ancien Régime russe: État et société en Russie impériale (Paris: Seuil, 1982); translated as Understanding Imperial Russia: State and Society in the Old Regime (Columbia University Press, 1984)]
- The Well-Ordered Police State: Social and Institutional Change through Law in the Germanies and Russia, 1600–1800 (Yale University Press, 1983)
- Russia Abroad: A Cultural History of the Russian Emigration, 1919–1939 (Oxford University Press, 1990)
- Political Ideas and Institutions in Imperial Russia (Boulder, CO: Westview, 1994); his essays; with bibliography of his work
- Politique et culture en Russie: 18e-20e siècles (Paris: Éditions de l'École des hautes études en sciences sociales, 1996)
- The Russian empire: the Romanovs and their books (1997)
- A bibliography of Raeff's works through 1987 is in Ezra Mendelsohn and Marshall Shatz, eds., Imperial Russia, 1700–1917: State, Society, Opposition. Essays in Honor of Marc Raeff (Northern Illinois University Press, 1988).
- Molloy, Molly, ed. "Marc Raeff: A Bibliography (1993-2008)" Kritika: Explorations in Russian & Eurasian History (2011) 12#1 pp 141–159.
