= Savinkov =

Savinkov (Russian: Савинков) is a Russian masculine surname, its feminine counterpart is Savinkova. It may refer to

- Boris Savinkov (1879–1925), Russian writer and revolutionary militant
- Galina Savinkova (born 1953), Soviet discus thrower
- Ludmila Savinkova (born 1936), Soviet rhythmic gymnast
