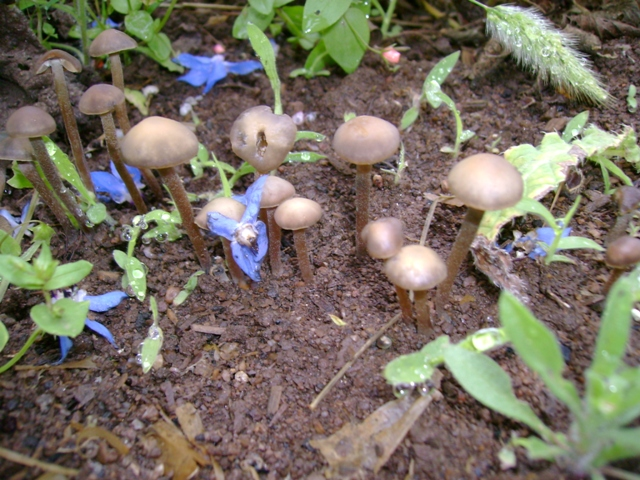
- Copelandia bispora

Scientific classification
- Kingdom: Fungi
- Division: Basidiomycota
- Class: Agaricomycetes
- Order: Agaricales
- Family: Bolbitiaceae
- Genus: Copelandia; Bres.

Type species
- Copelandia papilionacea (Bull.) Bres.

= Copelandia =

Genus of fungi

Copelandia is a now deprecated genus of mushrooms consisting of at least 12 species. Many American mycologists previously placed members of Panaeolus which stain blue into Copelandia, whilst European mycologists generally used the name Panaeolus instead. Now all mushrooms previously categorised under Copelandia are universally classified in Panaeolus. The genus Copelandia was created as a subgenus of Panaeolus by Abbé Giacomo Bresadola (1847–1929) in honor of Edwin Bingham Copeland (1873–1964), an American who gathered fungi in the Philippines and sent some collections to Bresadola.

Copelandia species are white to gray or tan, usually with long, thin fragile stem and are delicate. They are found in the tropics and neotropics of both hemispheres, growing in grasslands, on dead moss, dead grass, sand dunes, decayed wood, and dung. Blue staining on the caps and stems can often be observed where the mushroom has been bruised due to psilocin content. The cap is never viscid and often develops a cracked appearance as it dries out. None of the mushrooms in Copelandia have a partial veil and the gills always have thick walled pseudocystidia, often with crystals at the ends. Chrysocystidia are never present.

All species of Copelandia are known to contain the hallucinogens psilocin and psilocybin.

== Species list ==
- C. affinis (E. Horak)
- C. bispora (Malençon & Bertault) Singer
- C. cambodginiensis (Ola'h & R. Heim) Singer
- C. chlorocystis Singer & R.A. Weeks
- C. cyanescens (Berkeley & Broome) Singer
- C. lentisporus (Ew. Gerhardt) Guzmán
- C. mexicana Guzmán
- C. tirunelveliensis Natarajan & Raman
- C. tropica Natarajan & Raman
- C. tropicalis (Ola'h) Singer & R.A. Weeks

== See also ==
- List of Psilocybin mushrooms
- Rolf Singer
