= List of Panaeolus species =

The following is a list of the about 98 Panaeolus mushroom species:

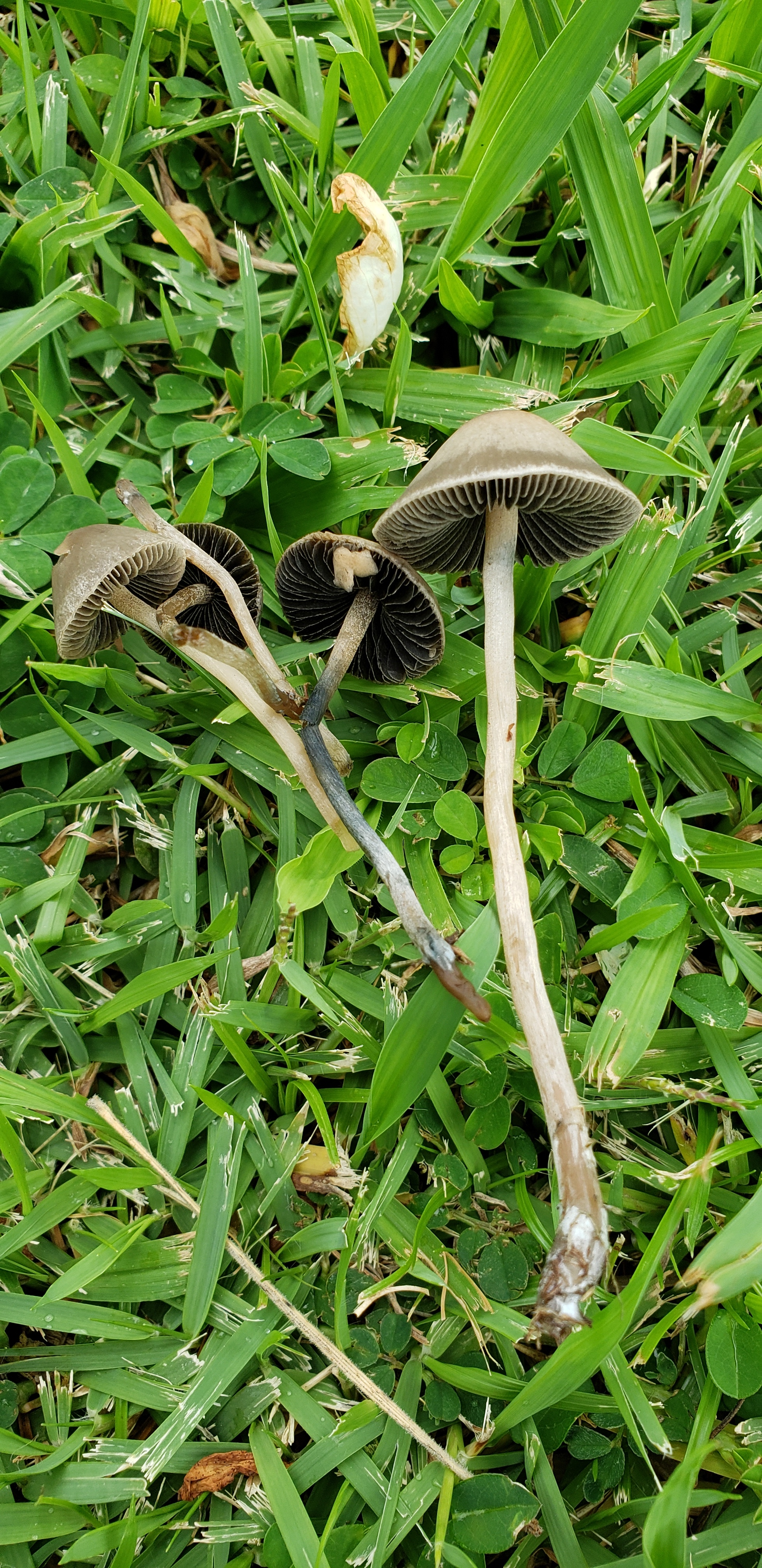
Panaeolus subg. Copelandia

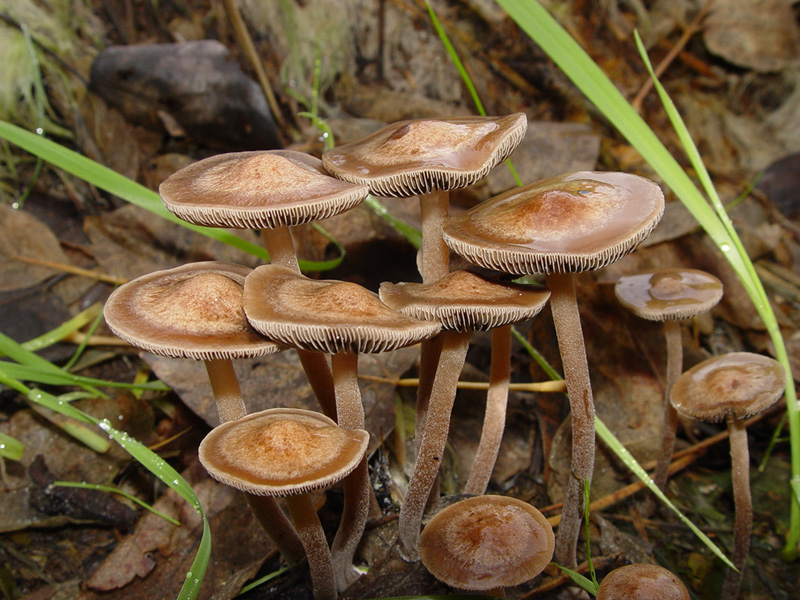
Panaeolus cinctulus (Bolton 1791) Sacc. 1887

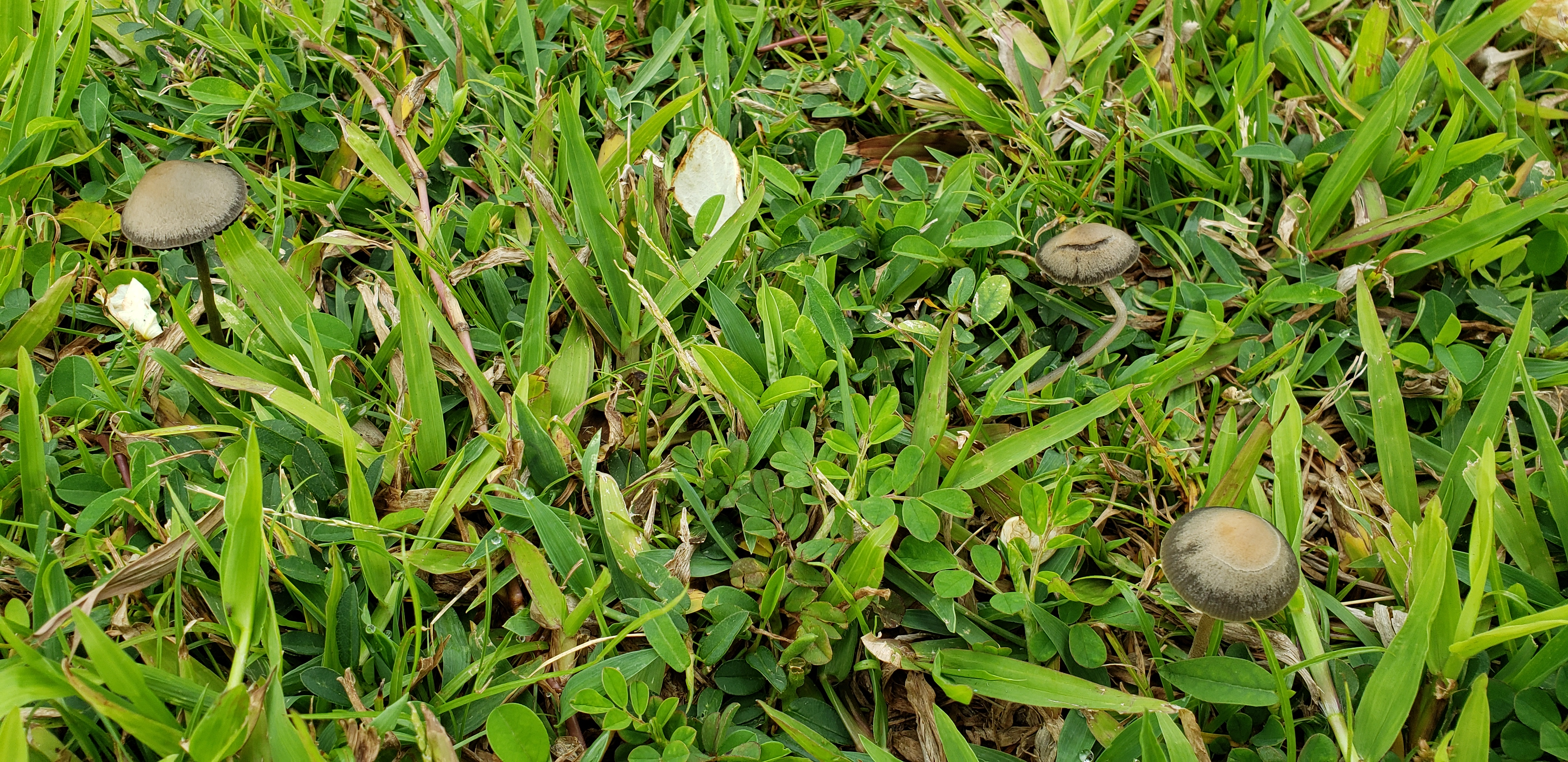
Panaeolus subg. Copelandia from Hawai'i.

- Panaeolus acidus
- Panaeolus acuminatus
- Panaeolus affinis
- Panaeolus africanus, psychoactive
- Panaeolus albellus
- Panaeolus albidocinereus
- Panaeolus albovelutinus
- Panaeolus alcis
- Panaeolus alveolatus
- Panaeolus annulatus
- Panaeolus anomalus
- Panaeolus antillarum
- Panaeolus atomatus
- Panaeolus atrobalteatus
- Panaeolus axfordii, psychoactive
- Panaeolus bernicis
- Panaeolus bisporus, psychoactive
- Panaeolus bolombensis
- Panaeolus bubalorum
- Panaeolus cambodginiensis, psychoactive
- Panaeolus campanulatus (=Panaeolus papilionaceus accepted name)
- Panaeolus campanuloides
- Panaeolus castaneifolius (=Panaeolus olivaceus accepted name), psychoactive
- Panaeolus cinctulus (Bolton) Britzelm., psychoactive
- Panaeolus chlorocystis
- Panaeolus cinereofuscus
- Panaeolus clelandii
- Panaeolus conicodiffractus
- Panaeolus convexulus
- Panaeolus cyanescens, psychoactive
- Panaeolus deviellus
- Panaeolus diffractus
- Panaeolus digressus
- Panaeolus eburneus
- Panaeolus epimyces
- Panaeolus expromptus
- Panaeolus exsignatus
- Panaeolus fimbriatus
- Panaeolus fimicola, psychoactive compounds in small amounts
- Panaeolus fimicoloides
- Panaeolus fimiputris
- Panaeolus foenisecii
- Panaeolus fontinalis
- Panaeolus fraxinophilus
- Panaeolus georgii
- Panaeolus gomphodes
- Panaeolus goossensiae
- Panaeolus griseofibrillosus
- Panaeolus guttulatus
- Panaeolus hippophilus
- Panaeolus hygrophanus
- Panaeolus hypomelas
- Panaeolus incanus
- Panaeolus indicus
- Panaeolus intermedius
- Panaeolus lentisporus
- Panaeolus lerchenfeldii
- Panaeolus leucophanes
- Panaeolus lignicola
- Panaeolus linnaeanus
- Panaeolus longiguus
- Panaeolus microsporus Ola'h & Cailleux, psychoactive
- Panaeolus moellerianus Singer, psychoactive
- Panaeolus niveus
- Panaeolus obtusisporus
- Panaeolus olivaceofuscus
- Panaeolus olivaceus F.H. Møller, psychoactive
- Panaeolus ovatus
- Panaeolus paludosus
- Panaeolus panaiensis
- Panaeolus papilionaceus
  - Panaeolus papilionaceus var. papilionaceus (Bull.) Quél., psychoactive
- Panaeolus pseudopapilionaceus
- Panaeolus pumilus
- Panaeolus pusillus
- Panaeolus queletii
- Panaeolus refellens
- Panaeolus regis
- Panaeolus remotus
- Panaeolus remyi
- Panaeolus reticulatus
- Panaeolus retirugis, (Fr.) Quél. (=Panaeolus papilionaceus accepted name)
- Panaeolus rubricaulis
- Panaeolus rufus
- Panaeolus semiglobatus
- Panaeolus semilanceatus
- Panaeolus semiovatus
  - Panaeolus semiovatus var. phalaenarum
  - Panaeolus semiovatus var. semiovatus
- Panaeolus sepulchralis
- Panaeolus solidipes, edible
- Panaeolus sphinctrinus (=Panaeolus papilionaceus accepted name)
- Panaeolus squamulosus
- Panaeolus subbalteatus (=Panaeolus cinctulus), psychoactive
- Panaeolus subditus
- Panaeolus subfirmus
- Panaeolus teutonicus
- Panaeolus texensis
- Panaeolus tirunelveliensis
- Panaeolus tropicalis, psychoactive
- Panaeolus uliginicola
- Panaeolus uliginosus
- Panaeolus variabilis
- Panaeolus venenosus
- Panaeolus venezolanus
- Panaeolus westii
