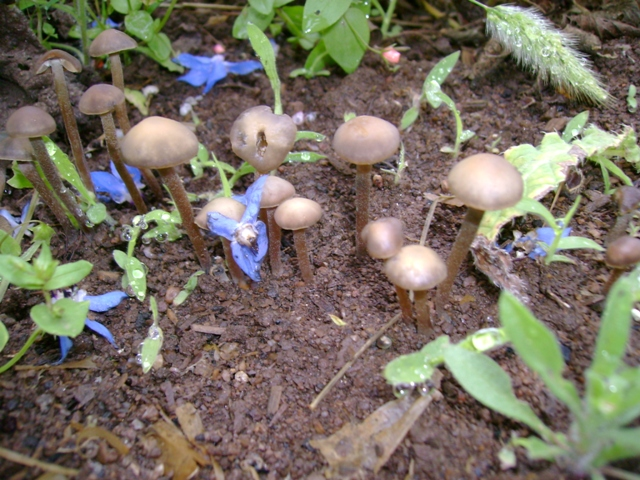

Scientific classification
- Kingdom: Fungi
- Division: Basidiomycota
- Class: Agaricomycetes
- Order: Agaricales
- Family: Bolbitiaceae
- Genus: Panaeolus
- Species: P. bisporus

Binomial name
- Panaeolus bisporus (Malencon and Bertault) Singer and Weeks

Synonyms
- Panaeolus bispora Copelandia bisporus Copelandia bispora

= Panaeolus bisporus =

Species of Agaricomycetes

Panaeolus bisporus, also known as Copelandia bisporus, is a rare and widely distributed little brown mushroom that bruises blue.

This mushroom is similar macroscopically to Panaeolus tropicalis, Panaeolus cambodginiensis and Panaeolus cyanescens, but can be differentiated using a microscope by its two spored basidia.

== Description ==
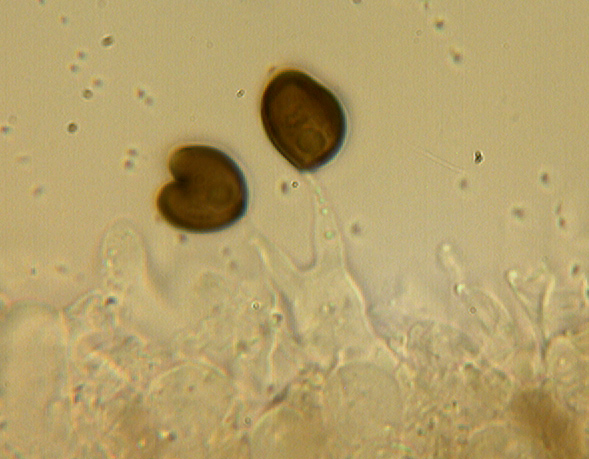
Panaeolus bisporus two spored basidum

This is a little brown mushroom that grows on dung and has black spores. It has been found in Hawaii, Southern California, North Africa, Spain and Switzerland.

The cap is 15-30 mm tan to gray fading to black sometimes when covered with spores and with a defined ring zone somewhat globe shaped or bell shaped to convex, hardly expanding, margin often torn and pedaled, smooth not viscid, and slightly wrinkled and pitted with age. Dark grey-brown drying whitish. The gills are adnexed or narrowly attachedtightly packed, mottled gray to jet black, white edges. The stem is white, fibrous, 65-120 mm long 2-3 mm thick, hollow, translucent gray, bruising heavily blue where bruised. It produces spores that are jet black, elliptical, 12-14 x 8-10 x 6-7.5 μm smooth and opaque, elongated with germ pore straight off the end. Microscopic features are 2 spored basidia 18 - 23 × 8-10 μm, cheilocystidia are bottle shaped and clear 20-30 μm, metuloids with yellow brown walls 40-55 × 12-15 μm some with excreted crystals.

Its habitat are saprotrophic on grasses.

== See also ==
- List of Panaeolus species
