= C. mexicana =

C. mexicana may refer to:

- Ceratozamia mexicana, a plant species endemic to Mexico
- Copelandia mexicana, a mushroom species in the genus Copelandia
- Crataegus mexicana, the tejocote, manzanita, tejocotera or Mexican hawthorn, a tree species native to the mountains of Mexico and parts of Guatemala

== Synonyms ==
- Cowania mexicana, a synonym for Purshia mexicana, the Mexican cliffrose, a perennial flowering small tree species native to Mexico and the southwestern United States
- Cyathea mexicana, a synonym for the tree fern Alsophila firma

== See also ==
- Mexicana (disambiguation)
