= P. africanus =

P. africanus may refer to:

- Panaeolus africanus, a little brown mushroom species
- Paranthodon africanus, a dinosaur species from the middle of the Cretaceous
- Phacochoerus africanus, the warthog, a wild pig species found in Africa
- Proconsul africanus, an extinct primate species of the Miocene
- Pseudoniphargus africanus, a crustacean species in the genus Pseudoniphargus

== See also ==
- Africanus (disambiguation)
