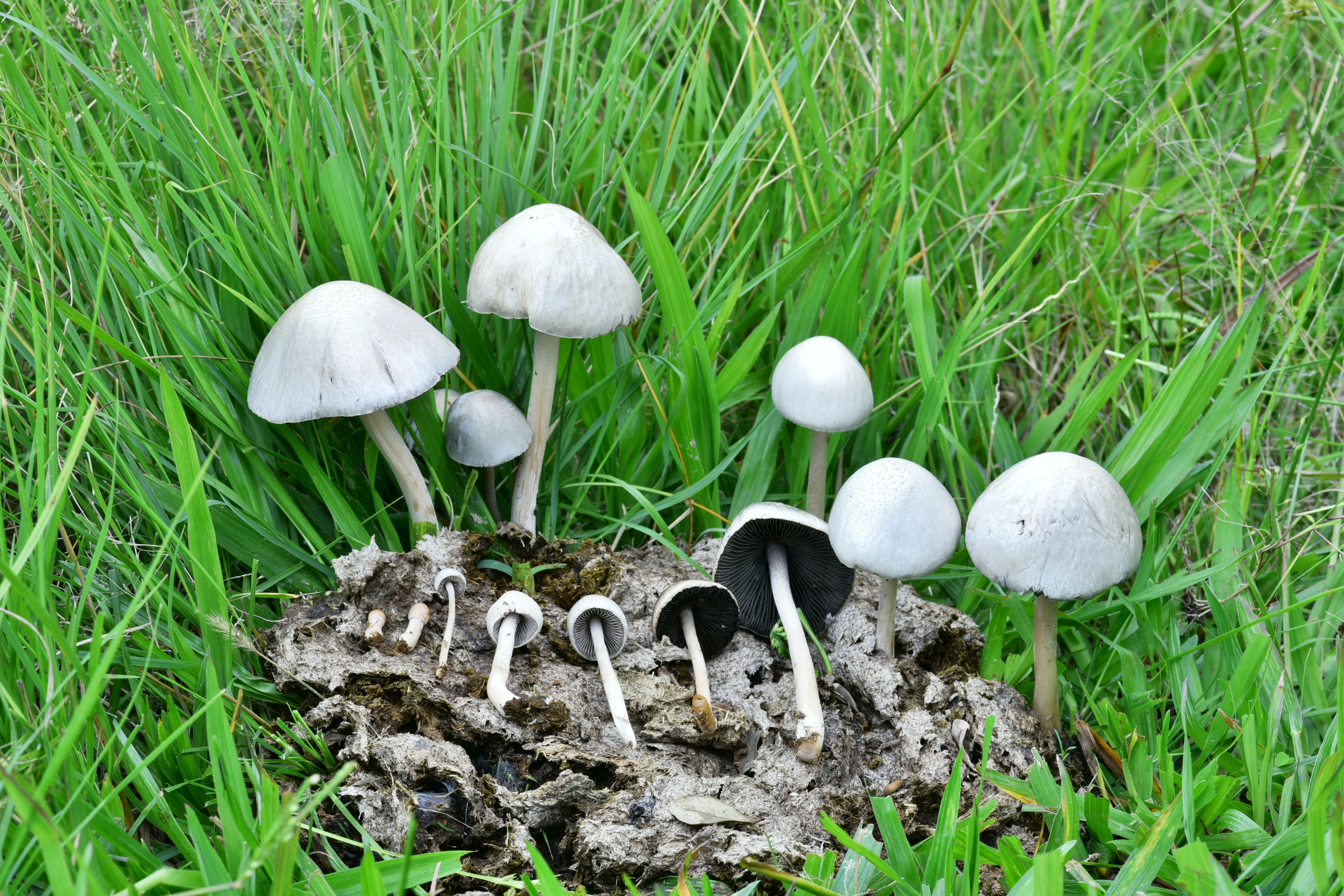

Scientific classification
- Domain: Eukaryota
- Kingdom: Fungi
- Division: Basidiomycota
- Class: Agaricomycetes
- Order: Agaricales
- Family: Bolbitiaceae
- Genus: Panaeolus
- Species: P. antillarum

Binomial name
- Panaeolus antillarum (Fr.) Dennis

Synonyms
- Agaricus antillarum; Agaricus solidipes; Panaeolus phalaenarum; Panaeolus sepulchralis; Psilocybe antillarum

= Panaeolus antillarum =

Species of fungus

Panaeolus antillarum Mycological characteristics
- Gills on hymenium
- Cap is convex
- Hymenium is adnexed
- Stipe is bare
- Spore print is black
- Ecology is saprotrophic
- Edibility is edible

Panaeolus antillarum is a species of mushroom in the family Bolbitiaceae.

== Description ==
- Cap: 3 to 6 cm, bell-shaped to convex, white to light gray or yellowish. The caps are thick, smooth, often with fine wrinkles and acquire a silver white shiny color in age.
- Gills: Gray in young specimens, turning black as the spores mature.
- Spore print: Black.
- Stipe: 4 to 22 cm long and .5 to 2 cm thick, solid, sometimes slightly larger at the base.
- Taste: Fungal.
- Odor: Fungal.
- Size: Small to medium.
- Microscopic features: Spores ellipsoid, 15 - 20 (21) x 10 - 14 x 8 - 10(11) μm. Cheilocystidia cylindrical to narrowly utriform, colorless, 30 - 45 μm. Sulphidia clavate, sometimes with a stalk, 25 - 50 μm. Basidia four spored, 30 - 35 micrometers long.
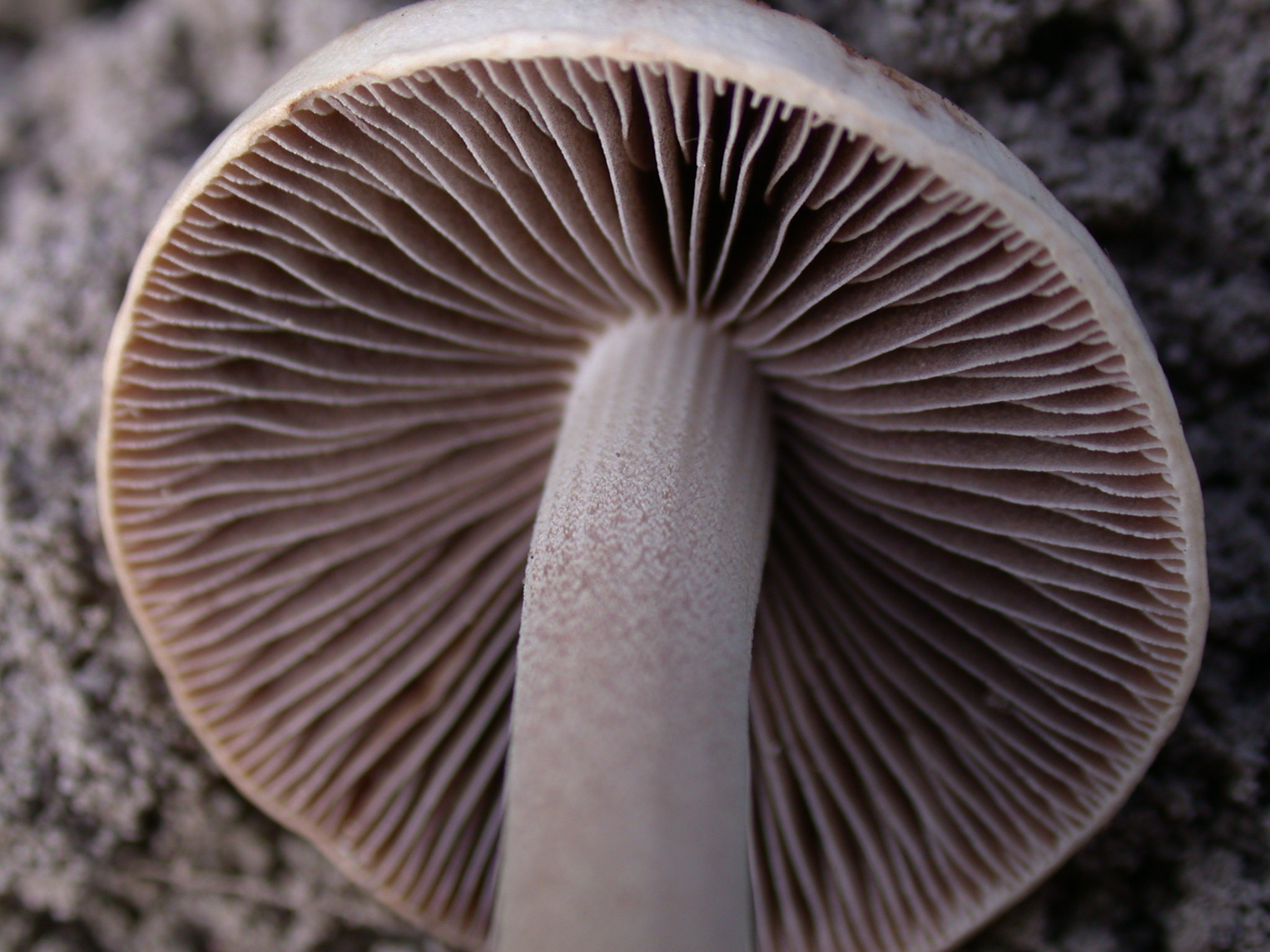

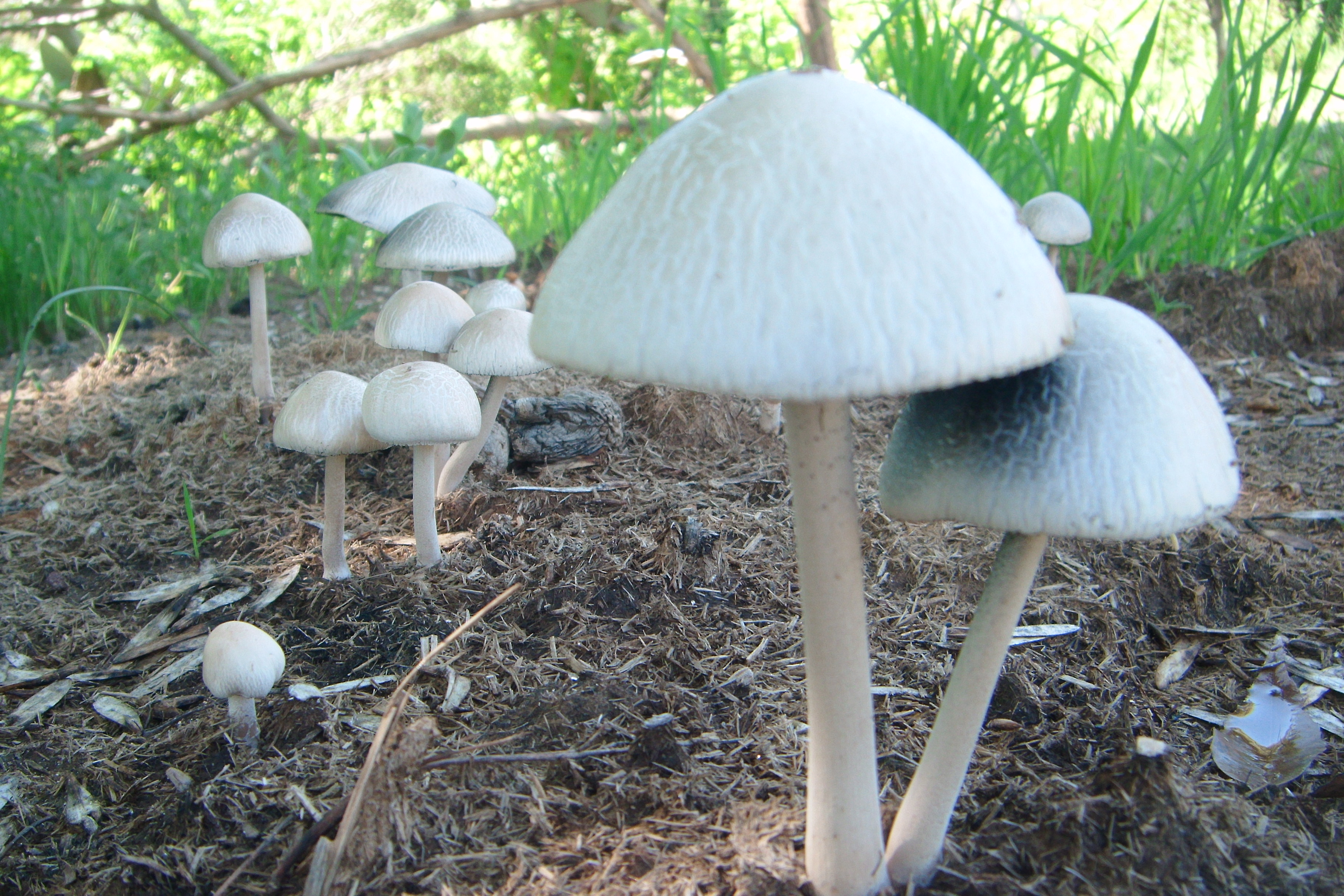

=== Similar species ===
It is often mistaken for Panaeolus semiovatus var. phalaenarum or Panaeolus cyanescens, the latter species can be distinguished by the thinner, grayer cap and blue bruising.

== Distribution and habitat ==
It's common and widely distributed. It grows on dung. It is found from northern North America through Mexico into northern South America.

== Uses ==
It is edible but not commonly eaten.

== See also ==
- List of Panaeolus species
