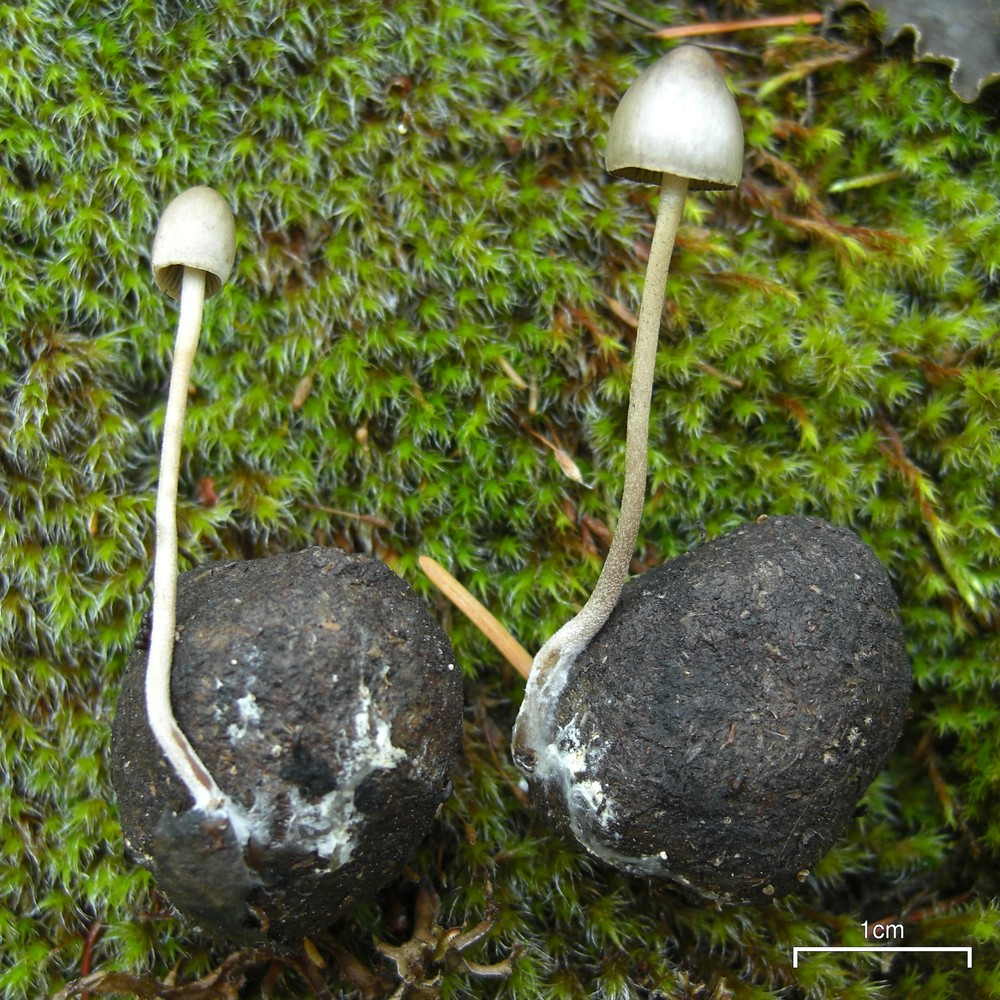

Scientific classification
- Domain: Eukaryota
- Kingdom: Fungi
- Division: Basidiomycota
- Class: Agaricomycetes
- Order: Agaricales
- Family: Bolbitiaceae
- Genus: Panaeolus
- Species: P. alcis

Binomial name
- Panaeolus alcis M.M.Moser (1984)

Synonyms
- Panaeolus alcidis M.M.Moser (1984)

= Panaeolus alcis =

Species of fungus

Panaeolus alcis is a species of agaric fungus in the family Bolbitiaceae. Found in Europe and Canada, it was described as new to science in 1984 by Austrian mycologist Meinhard Michael Moser. The type collection, made in Sweden, was found growing on moose dung. The fungus produces small, brown fruit bodies with bell-shaped to conical caps measuring 0.4–1 cm (0.2–0.4 in) in diameter and 0.3–0.9 cm (0.12–0.35 in) high. Gills are dark gray initially, then develop a black mottling when the spores mature. The gray to brownish stipe is 2–9 cm (0.8–3.5 in) long by 0.5–1.5 mm thick, and pruinose (covered with white powdery granules). Spores are smooth, dark brown, and have a pore. They measure 16.3–21 by 8–12 μm when viewed face-on, and 8–10 μm viewed from the side. The fungus has been mostly found fruiting on the droppings of moose, although it has also been recorded on roe deer and reindeer dung.

Moser originally published the name of this species invalidly in 1983 as Panaeolus alcidis; this name is now considered an orthographic variant.

== See also ==
- List of Panaeolus species
