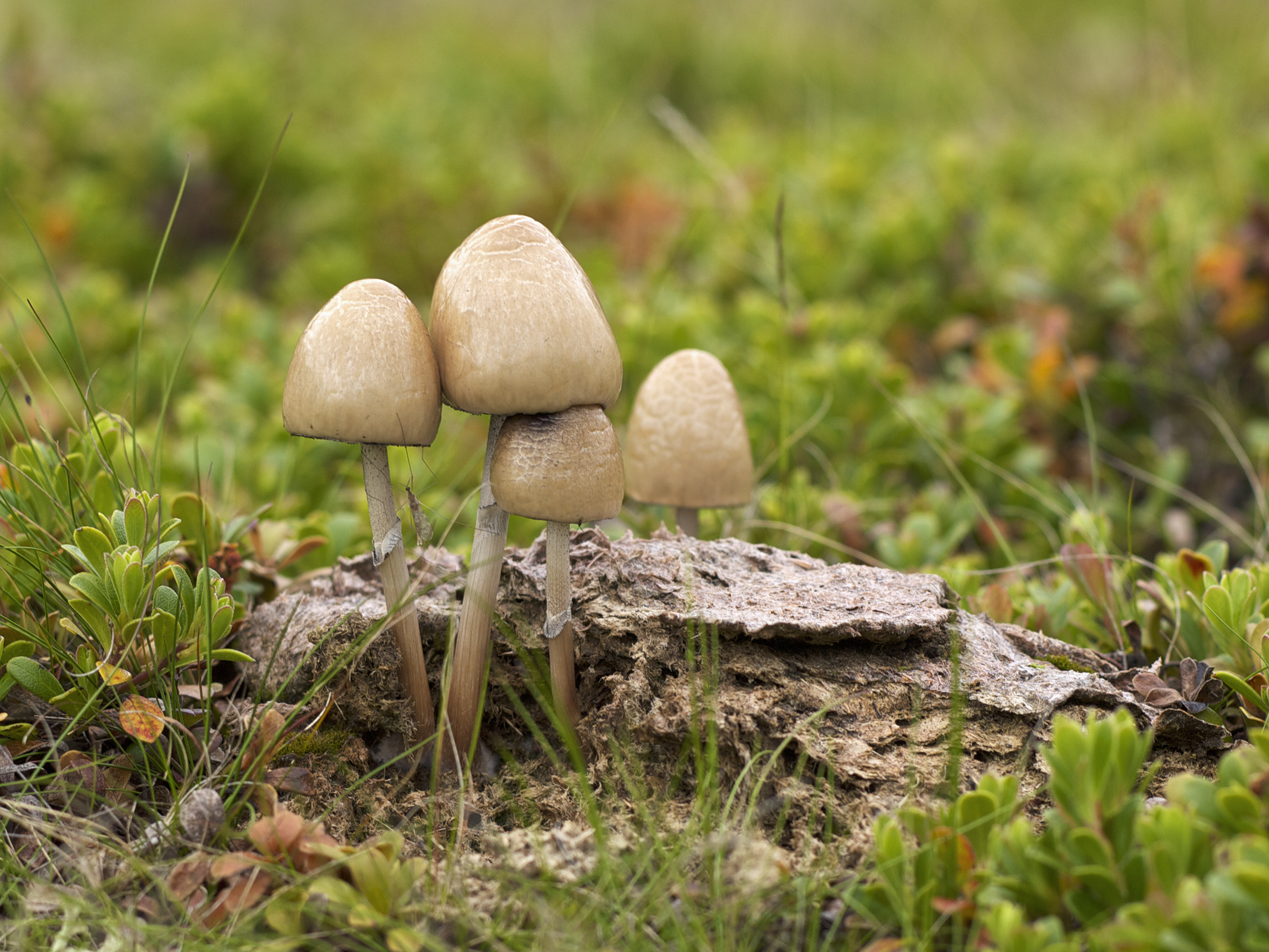

Scientific classification
- Kingdom: Fungi
- Division: Basidiomycota
- Class: Agaricomycetes
- Order: Agaricales
- Family: Bolbitiaceae
- Genus: Panaeolus
- Species: P. semiovatus
- Variety: P. s. var. semiovatus

Trinomial name
- Panaeolus semiovatus var. semiovatus Fr. (Lundell)

Synonyms
- Agaricus ciliaris; Agaricus semiovatus; Agaricus separatus; Anellaria semiovata; Anellaria separata; Panaeolus semiovatus; Panaeolus separatus

= Panaeolus semiovatus var. semiovatus =

Panaeolus semiovatus var. semiovatus
- Mycological characteristics
- Gills on hymenium
- Cap is ovate
- Hymenium is adnexed
- Stipe has a ring
- Spore print is black
- Ecology is saprotrophic
- Edibility is inedible

Panaeolus semiovatus var. semiovatus, also known as P. semiovatus and Anellaria separata, and commonly known as the ringed panaeolus, (Note: Other common names include shiny mottlegill, common fungus of the feces variety, and egghead mottlegill.) is a medium-sized buff-colored mushroom with black spores that grows on dung.

== Description ==
The cap is up to 9 centimetres (3 1/2 in) across, light tan then buff to whitish. It is oval then conical or parabolic. It is sticky when wet and often wrinkles when dry. The stem is up to 18 cm (7 in) long and 12 mm thick, solid and smooth, with an annulus (ring) that is white, but often blackened by falling spores. The gills are adnexed, being wider in the middle, and narrowing at both ends; they are brown to black. The flesh is white, or straw-colored. The spore print is black.

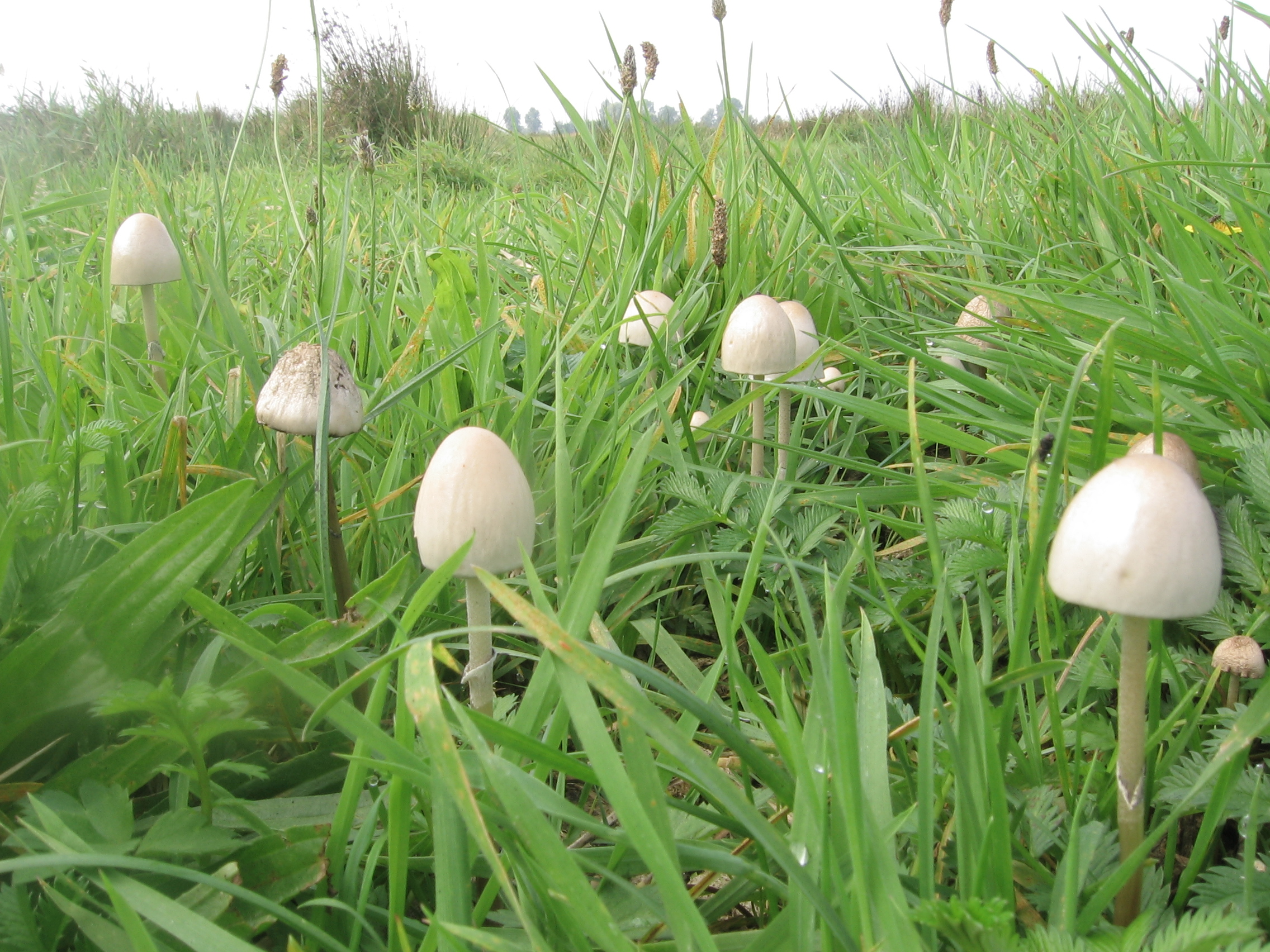
Wild Panaeolus semiovatus var. semiovatus

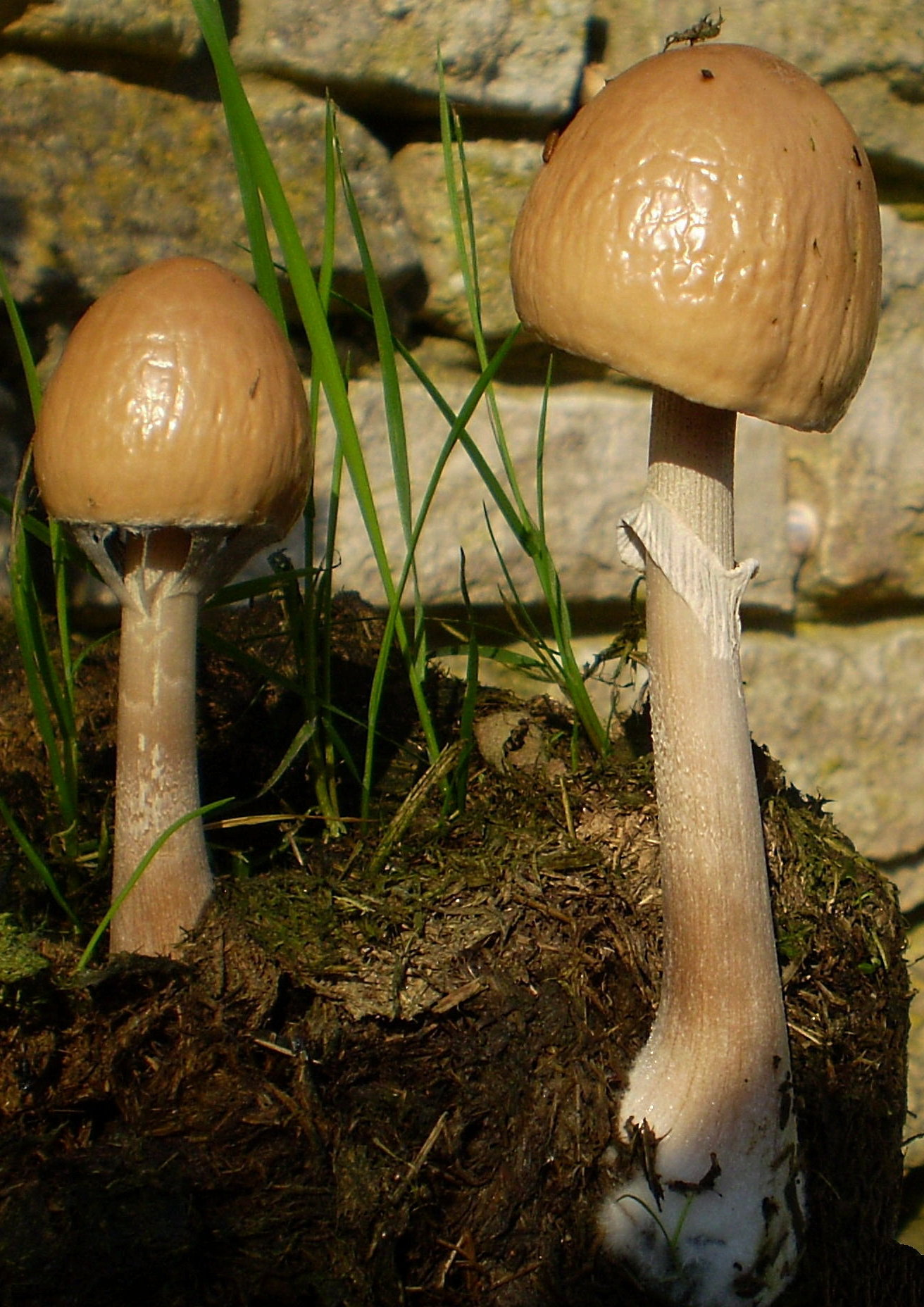
P. semiovatus var. semiovatus on horse manure

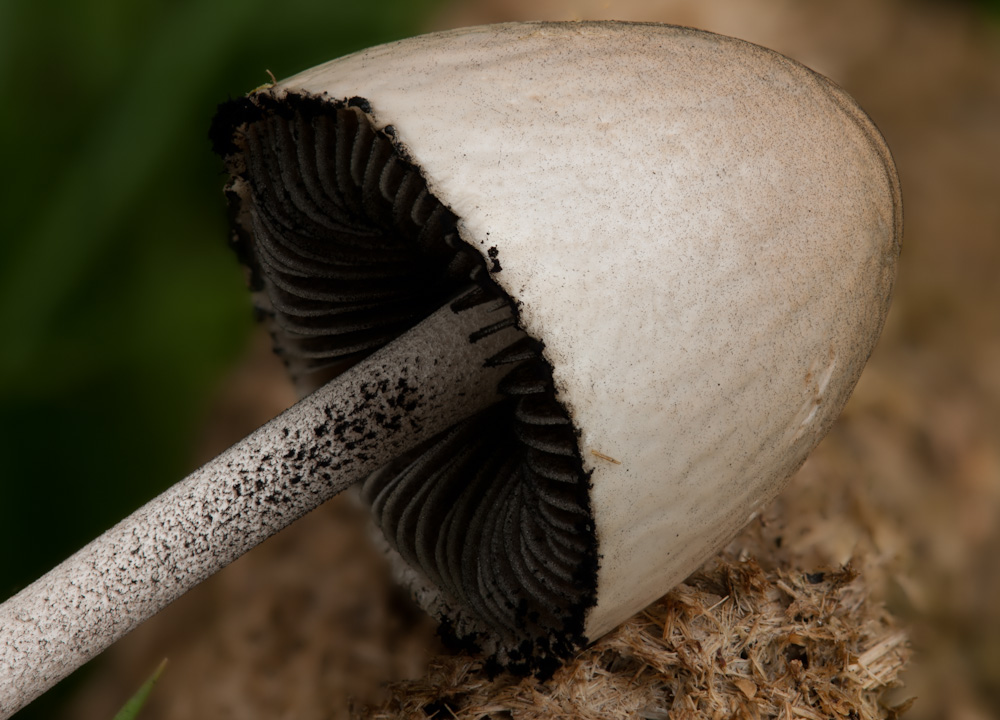
Close up of cap and gills with black spores

=== Similar species ===
The very similar P. semiovatus var. phalaenarum (Fr.) Ew. Gerhardt. 1996 syn. P. phalaenarum (Bull.) Quel. is more slender (cap 2–4 cm) and lacks the ring.

== Habitat and distribution ==
The species grows on horse dung. It is widely distributed and is present in many temperate zones of the world.

== Edibility ==
Though nonpoisonous, it is generally regarded as inedible and possessing a rather abysmal taste. It has been unreliably rumored to contain the indole alkaloid psilocybin. Some people experience gastric upset after consumption.

== See also ==
- List of Panaeolus species
