= Pseudoniphargus grandimanus =

Conservation status
- Critically Endangered (IUCN 2.3)

Scientific classification
- Kingdom: Animalia
- Phylum: Arthropoda
- Class: Malacostraca
- Order: Amphipoda
- Family: Pseudoniphargidae
- Genus: Pseudoniphargus
- Species: P. grandimanus

Binomial name
- Pseudoniphargus grandimanus Stock, Holsinger, Sket & Iliffe, 1986

Species of crustacean

Pseudoniphargus grandimanus is a species of crustacean in the gammaridan family Pseudoniphargidae. It is endemic to Bermuda.
