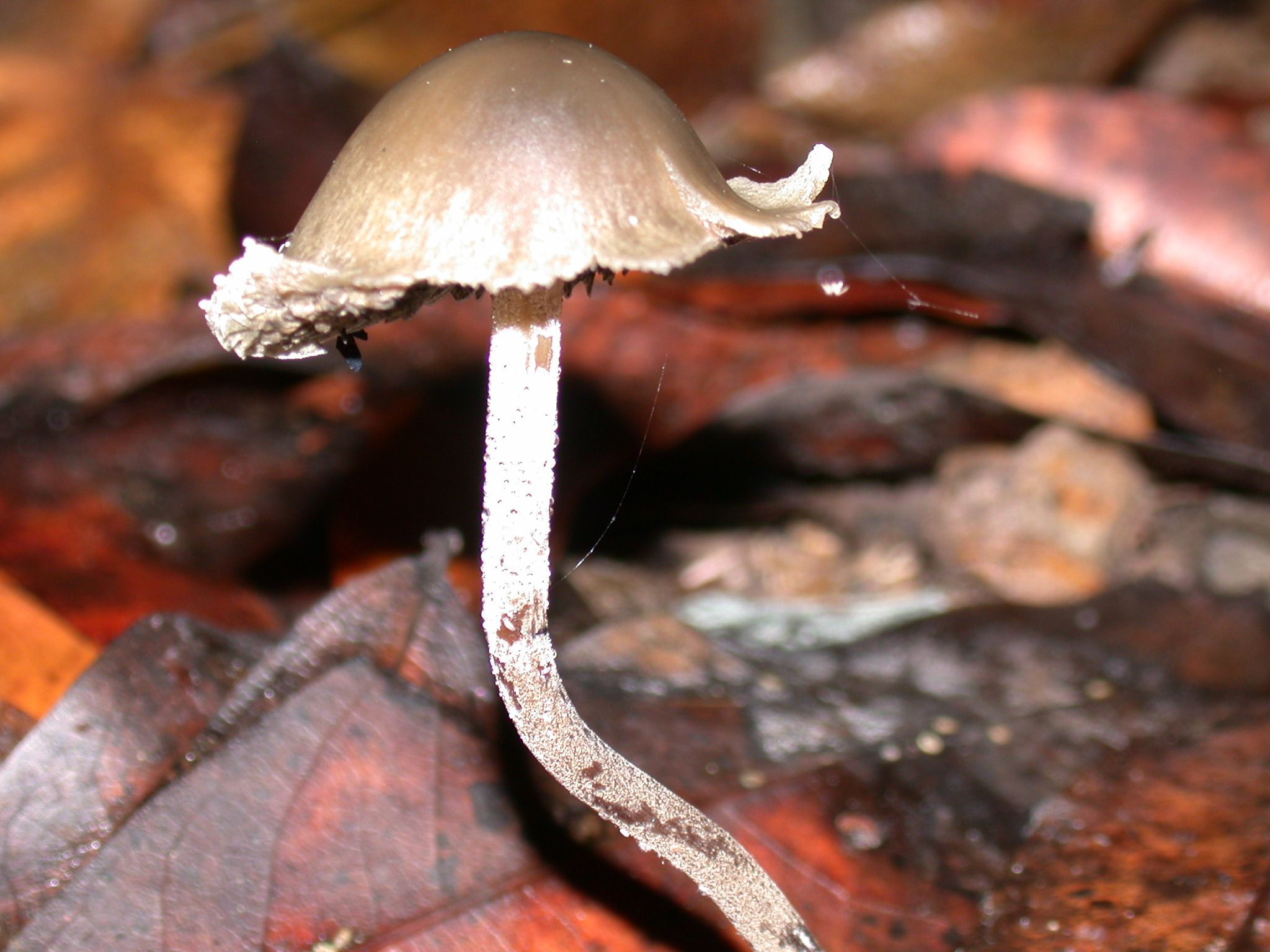

Scientific classification
- Kingdom: Fungi
- Division: Basidiomycota
- Class: Agaricomycetes
- Order: Agaricales
- Family: Bolbitiaceae
- Genus: Panaeolus
- Species: P. acuminatus

Binomial name
- Panaeolus acuminatus (Schaeffer) Quélet 1874

Synonyms
- Agaricus acuminatus Schaeff., 1774; Agaricus caliginosus Jungh., 1830; Panaeolus caliginosus (Jungh.) Gillet, 1874; Panaeolus rickenii Hora, 1960; Stropharia acuminata (Scop.) Murrill, 1922

= Panaeolus acuminatus =

Species of fungus

Panaeolus acuminatus
- Mycological characteristics
- Gills on hymenium
- Cap is convex
- Hymenium is adnexed
- Stipe is bare
- Spore print is black
- Ecology is saprotrophic
- Edibility is unknown

Panaeolus acuminatus, also known as Panaeolus rickenii, is a species of mushroom in the family Galeropsidaceae.

This species contains small amounts of serotonin, 5-HTP, and tryptophan.

== Description ==
P. acuminatus is a small brown mushroom that has black spores. It has a cap that is less than 4 cm across, hygrophanous, conic to campanulate to plane, usually with an umbo. The gills are dark purplish black, crowded, with several tiers of intermediate gills. The spores are (11) 13 - 15 (17) x 9 - 11 (12) x (6.5) 7 - 8 (9) micrometers, smooth, black, and shaped like lemons. Cheilocystidia present.

== Habitat and distribution ==
P. acuminatus grows in grass and dung. It has been found throughout North America and Europe and is very widely distributed.

== See also ==
- List of Panaeolus species
