= Panaeolus lentisporus =

Scientific classification
- Domain: Eukaryota
- Kingdom: Fungi
- Division: Basidiomycota
- Class: Agaricomycetes
- Order: Agaricales
- Family: Bolbitiaceae
- Genus: Panaeolus
- Species: P. lentisporus

Binomial name
- Panaeolus lentisporus Gerhardt, 1996

Species of psychoactive fungus

Panaeolus lentisporus is a species of psychoactive mushroom belonging to the genus Panaeolus, and classified under the family Bolbitiaceae. It is native to Papua New Guinea and some parts of Asia. The fungus was first described by E. Gerhardt in 1996. It is very similar to Panaeolus affinis, and should not be confused with it.

== Description ==
The fungal species lives on rotting wood, and has unique spores which distinguish it from P. affinis. The spores are flattened, and wider than they are long when observing them in face view. They are also darker than the spores of the other species similar to it. Otherwise the species present as almost identical.

== Presence of psilocybin ==
Panaeolus lentisporus contains a chemical compound called psilocybin, which is known to cause hallucination and distortion of reality when ingested. For this reason, this species of mushroom is often used as a psychoactive drug either for recreational or spiritual applications.
