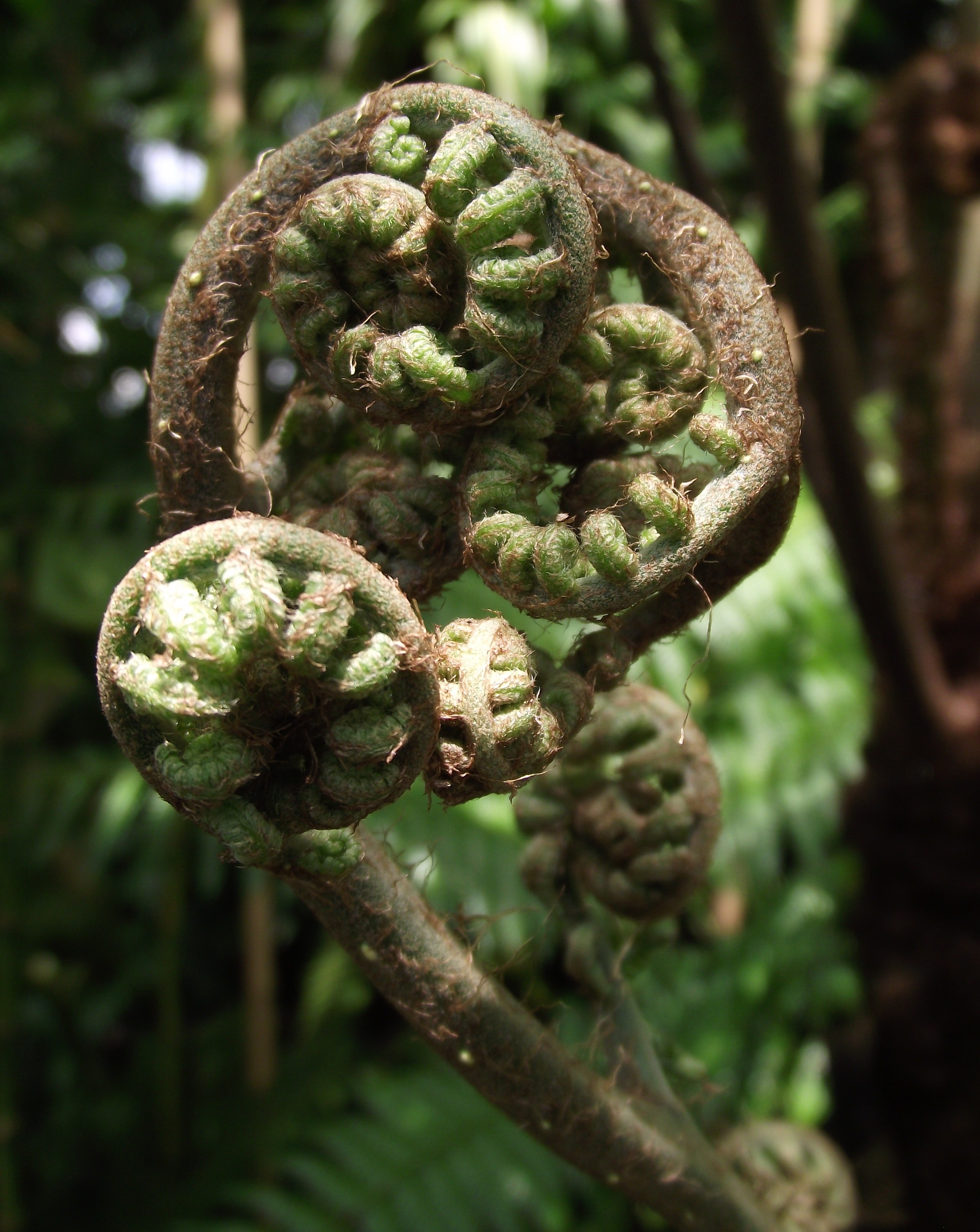

Scientific classification
- Kingdom: Plantae
- Clade: Tracheophytes
- Division: Polypodiophyta
- Class: Polypodiopsida
- Order: Cyatheales
- Family: Cyatheaceae
- Genus: Alsophila
- Species: A. firma

Binomial name
- Alsophila firma (Baker) D.S.Conant

Synonyms
- Alsophila costalis Christ; Alsophila furcata Christ; Alsophila infesta var. vangeertii G.Schneid.; Alsophila tenerifrons Christ; Alsophila vangeertii Goebel; Cyathea arida Christ; Cyathea articulata Fée; Cyathea costalis Domin; Cyathea denudans Kunze; Cyathea firma Domin (nom. illeg.); Cyathea firmula Domin; Cyathea gemmifera Christ; Cyathea mexicana Schltdl. & Cham.; Cyathea patellaris Christ; Cyathea tenerifrons Domin; Cyathea trejoi Christ; Hemitelia firma Baker; Nephelea mexicana (Schltdl. & Cham.) R.M.Tryon; Nephelea patellaris (Christ) R.M.Tryon; Nephelea tenerifrons (Christ) R.M.Tryon

= Alsophila firma =

Species of tree fern

Alsophila firma, commonly known as the maquique fern (Spanish: helecho maquique, Nahuatl languages: peshma), is a deciduous tree fern in the family Cyatheaceae endemic to Mexico, other countries of Central America, Colombia, and Ecuador. In the cloud forests of Mexico, it is considered an emblematic species and serves as a host for native epiphytic plants. However, habitat destruction and overconsumption of the trunks for handicraft production have threatened populations in Mexico. As a result, Alsophila firma is considered threatened in the state of Veracruz and has been given special protection per Mexican law.

== Description ==
Alsophila firma is a tree fern, with an erect above-ground stem growing up to 10.5 meters (34.4 ft) tall and up to 30 centimeters (10 in) in diameter. The stipes (leaf stalks) are armed with thick, black, curved spines that can be up to 12 millimeters (0.47 in) long, and, like other Cyatheaceae, bear scales. The scales are quite narrow, dark brown in the center with pale, erose (ragged) margins, and with a long dark seta (bristle) at the tip, the latter being characteristic of Alsophila.

Like other species of Alsophila, Alsophila firma has scaled stems and stipes. Adult individuals grow up to 10.5 meters and are typically found at 750 and 2000 meters above sea level.

== Ecology ==
Alsophila firma is the host species to a number of fungi including Bisporella pteridicola, Crocicreas quinqueseptatum, Dasyscyphella dryina, Hyaloscypha fuckelii, among others. The stems of Alsophila firma are to date the only known habitat of the fungal genus Arachnopeziza.

== Uses ==
In Mexican traditional medicine, a filtered infusion of the dried rhizome of Alsophila firma is used to control blood sugar levels among people with type 2 diabetes in a fasting state. Until 2021, this claim of Alsophila firma's hypoglycemic effects were not formally studied. Research by an ethnopharmacology group at the National Autonomous University of Mexico showed both significant glycemic control among hyperglycemic rats who were given an aqueous extract and inhibition of glucose 6-phosphatase and fructose 1,6-bisphosphatase in in vitro assays. Based on these results, the ability to regulate hyperglycemia is believed to be related to inhibiting hepatic glucose output while in a fasting state.
