= Panaeolus microsporus =

Scientific classification
- Kingdom: Fungi
- Division: Basidiomycota
- Class: Agaricomycetes
- Order: Agaricales
- Family: Bolbitiaceae
- Genus: Panaeolus
- Species: P. microsporus

Binomial name
- Panaeolus microsporus Ola'h & Cailleux

Species of fungus

Panaeolus microsporus
- Mycological characteristics
- Gills on hymenium
- Cap is convex
- Hymenium is adnexed
- Stipe is bare
- Spore print is black
- Ecology is saprotrophic
- Edibility is psychoactive

Panaeolus microsporus is a species of mushroom in the Bolbitiaceae family. It is a psychoactive species of the Panaeolus genus, containing alkaloids like psilocybin and psilosin. All Panaeolus species produce serotonin and serotonin derivatives.

== Characteristics ==
Like all Panaeolus species, they form small mushrooms with black spores and mottled gills. The gills form spots from the uneven maturation of the spores.

== Habitat & distribution ==
Panaeolus microsporus is found growing on dung. Their distribution has been noted within the Central African Republic.

== Neurological effects ==
Psilocybin has a chemical structure similar to that of serotonin, a neurotransmitter involved in mood regulation, concentration, and sleep. Psilocybin's structure is likely the reason for its effects on serotonin receptors which can impact mood and cause difficulty concentrating, restlessness, and hallucinations.

== Legality ==
Throughout the world, the legality of psilocybin containing mushrooms varies. Under the United Nations 1971 Convention on Psychotropic Substances, psilocybin is listed as a Schedule I substance in the US, and a Class A drug in the UK. Therefore, the possession and consumption of psilocybin-containing mushrooms is prohibited by federal law. Local and state laws may vary.

== See also ==
- Psilocybin mushrooms
- Psilocybe
- Baeocystin
