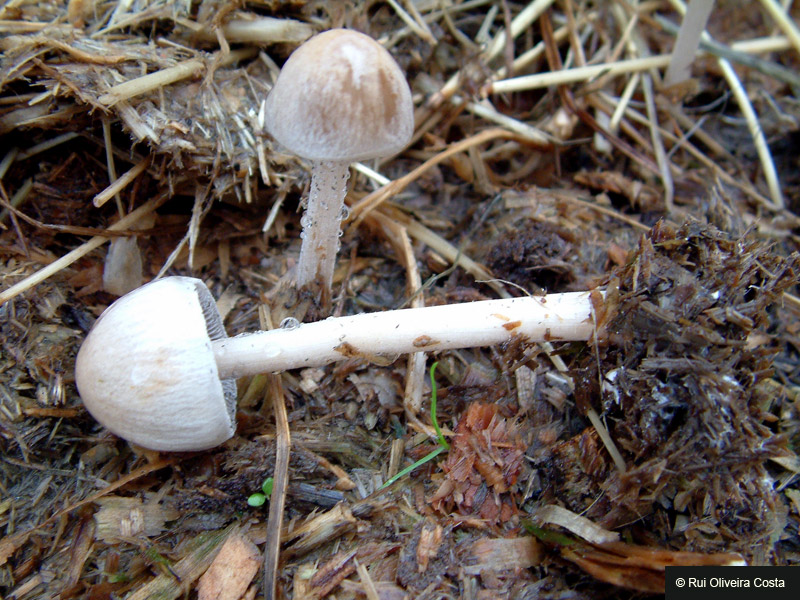

Scientific classification
- Kingdom: Fungi
- Division: Basidiomycota
- Class: Agaricomycetes
- Order: Agaricales
- Family: Bolbitiaceae
- Genus: Panaeolus
- Species: P. semiovatus
- Variety: P. s. var. phalaenarum

Trinomial name
- Panaeolus semiovatus var. phalaenarum (Fr.) Ew.Gerhardt

Synonyms
- Agaricus phalaenarum Panaeolus phalaenarum Panaeolus egregius Panaeolus antillarum

= Panaeolus semiovatus var. phalaenarum =

Species of fungus

Panaeolus semiovatus var. phalaenarum
- Mycological characteristics
- Gills on hymenium
- Cap is convex
- Hymenium is adnexed
- Stipe has a ring
- Spore print is black
- Ecology is saprotrophic
- Edibility is edible

Panaeolus semiovatus var. phalaenarum is a common and widely distributed medium-sized grey mushroom that grows on dung.

Panaeolus semiovatus var. phalaenarum is often mistaken for Panaeolus semiovatus.

== Taxonomy ==
The binomial Panaeolus antillarum that previously referred to a closely related species, is now reduced to synonymy with Panaeolus semiovatus var. phalaenarum by most authorities.

== Description ==
Panaeolus semiovatus var. phalaenarum is a medium-sized mushroom which has a cap that is 2 to 4 cm, convex, and is white to yellowish. Often mistaken for its larger cousin Panaeolus semiovatus var. semiovatus, from which it differs in being more slender and having no annulus (ring).

This mushroom prefers tropical climates.

== See also ==
- List of Panaeolus species
