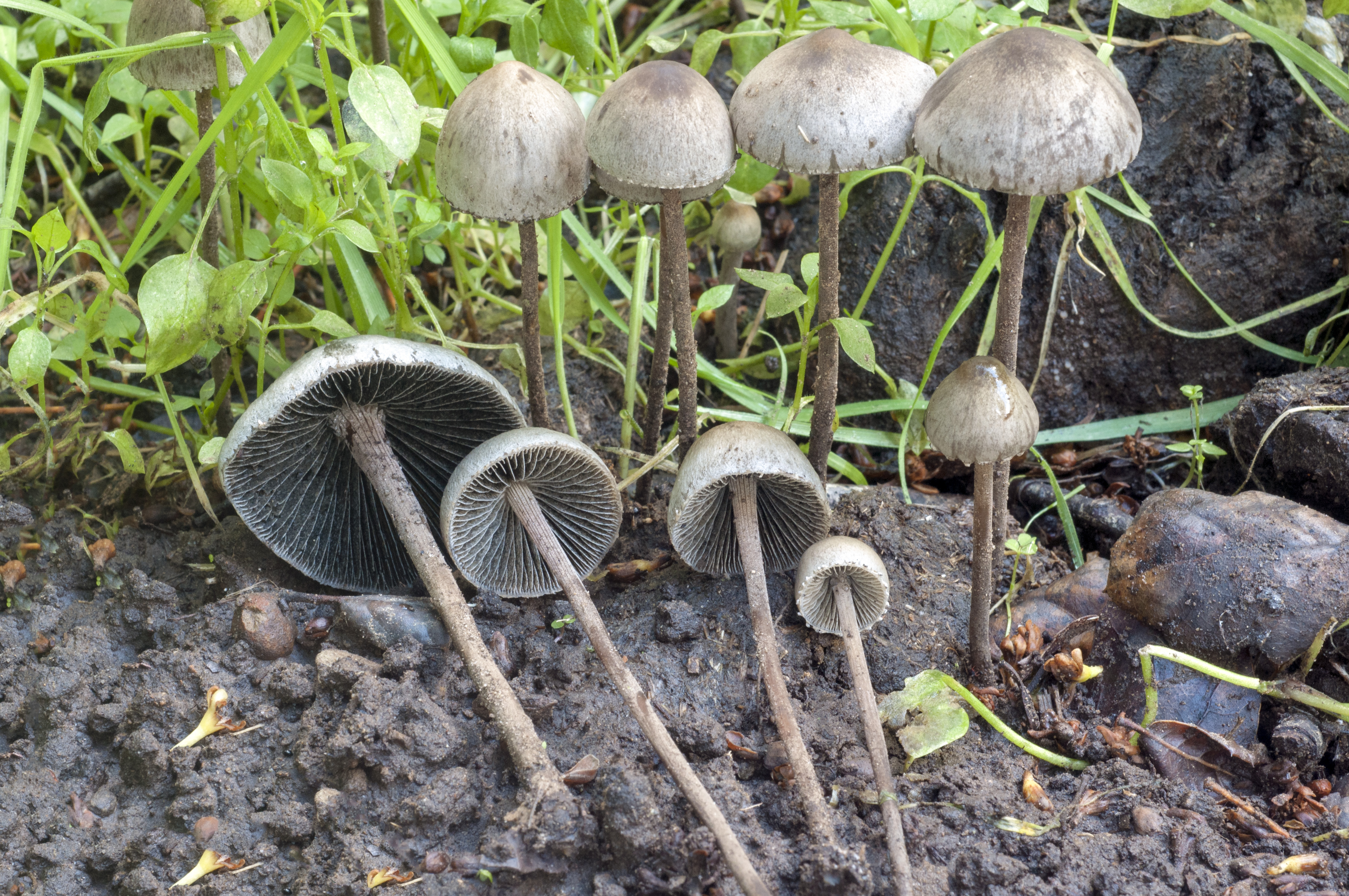

Scientific classification
- Kingdom: Fungi
- Division: Basidiomycota
- Class: Agaricomycetes
- Order: Agaricales
- Family: Bolbitiaceae
- Genus: Panaeolus
- Species: P. papilionaceus

Binomial name
- Panaeolus papilionaceus (Bull. ex Fries) Quélet

Synonyms
- Agaricus calosus Agaricus campanulatus Agaricus papilionaceus Galerula campanulata Panaeolus campanulatus Panaeolus sphinctrinus

= Panaeolus papilionaceus =

Species of fungus

Panaeolus papilionaceus
- Mycological characteristics
- Gills on hymenium
- Cap is convex
- Hymenium is adnexed
- Stipe is bare
- Spore print is black
- Ecology is saprotrophic
- Edibility is inedible

Panaeolus papilionaceus, (Note: Also known as Agaricus calosus, Panaeolus campanulatus and P. sphinctrinus) commonly known as the bell-capped mottlegill or Petticoat mottlegill, is a very common and widely distributed small brown mushroom that feeds on dung.

This mushroom is the type species for the genus Panaeolus.

== Description ==
The cap is 1–5 centimetres (1/2–2 in) across, obtusely conic then becoming campanulate, and grayish brown. It is not hygrophanous and the margin is adorned with white toothlike partial veil fragments when young or towards the edge. The flesh is thin.

The gills are adnate to adnexed, close to crowded, one or two tiers of intermediate gills, pale gray, acquiring a mottled, blackish appearance in age, with whitish edges. The spore print is black.

The stipe is 6–12 cm by 2–4 mm, gray-brown to reddish brown, darker where handled, paler toward the apex, brittle, fibrous, and pruinose.

The odor is mild and the taste unappetizing.

=== Microscopic features ===
The spores are 12–18 x 7–10 μm, elliptical, smooth, with an apical pore.

Basidia 4-sterigmate; abruptly clavate. Cheilocystidia abundant; subcylindric, often subcapitate or capitate.

=== Similar species ===
Panaeolus retirugis is similar but more robust, with a larger cap and thicker stem. Panaeolus pantropicalis has a more tropical distribution than Panaeolus papilionaceus and Panaeolus retirugis.

== Habitat and formation ==
Occurring singly, gregariously, or caespitosely on cow/horse dung, moose droppings, and in pastures. Widely distributed in North America throughout the year, but only in warmer climates in winter. It can be found in countries including Canada (Alberta, British Columbia), the United States (Alabama, Alaska, California, Colorado, Florida, Georgia, Indiana, Louisiana, Maine, Massachusetts, Missouri, Montana, New Mexico, New York, Oklahoma, Texas, Washington), the Caribbean (Bahamas, Cuba, San Vincent Island), Chile, Colombia, Uruguay, France, The Netherlands, Greece, Mexico, Norway, Slovenia, South Africa, Uganda, China, Iran, Lithuania, Kuwait, and the Philippines.

== Edibility ==
Panaeolus papilionaceus is inedible and is not substantial. While similar-looking species, such as Psilocybe mexicana, contain psilocybin, P. papilionaceus does not.

== Gallery ==
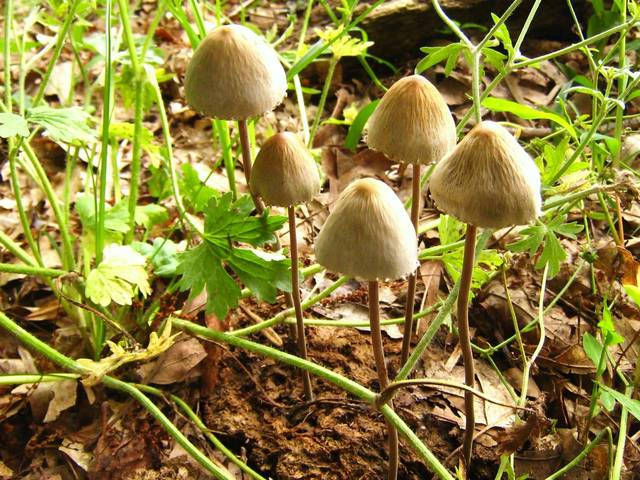
P. papilionaceus var. papilionaceus

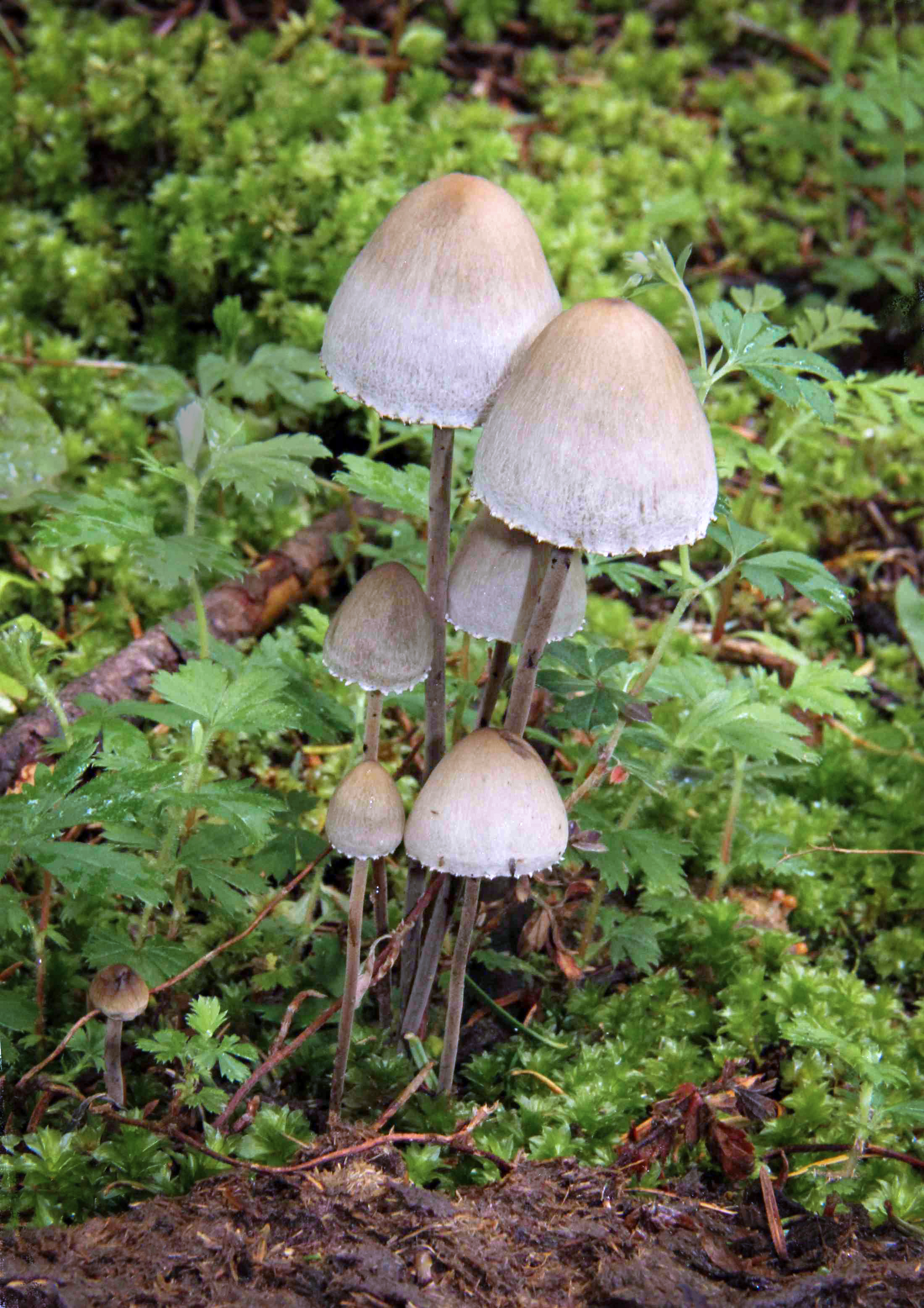

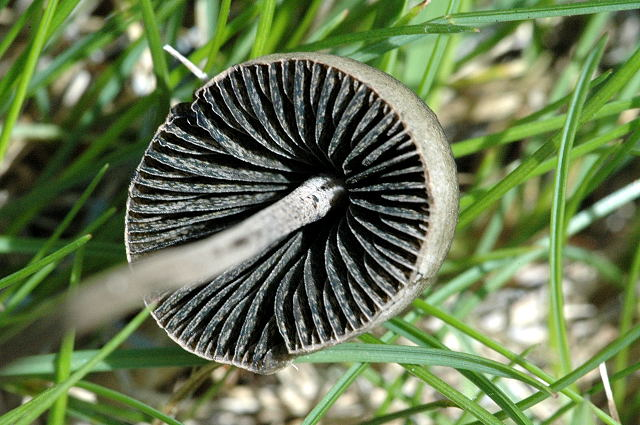

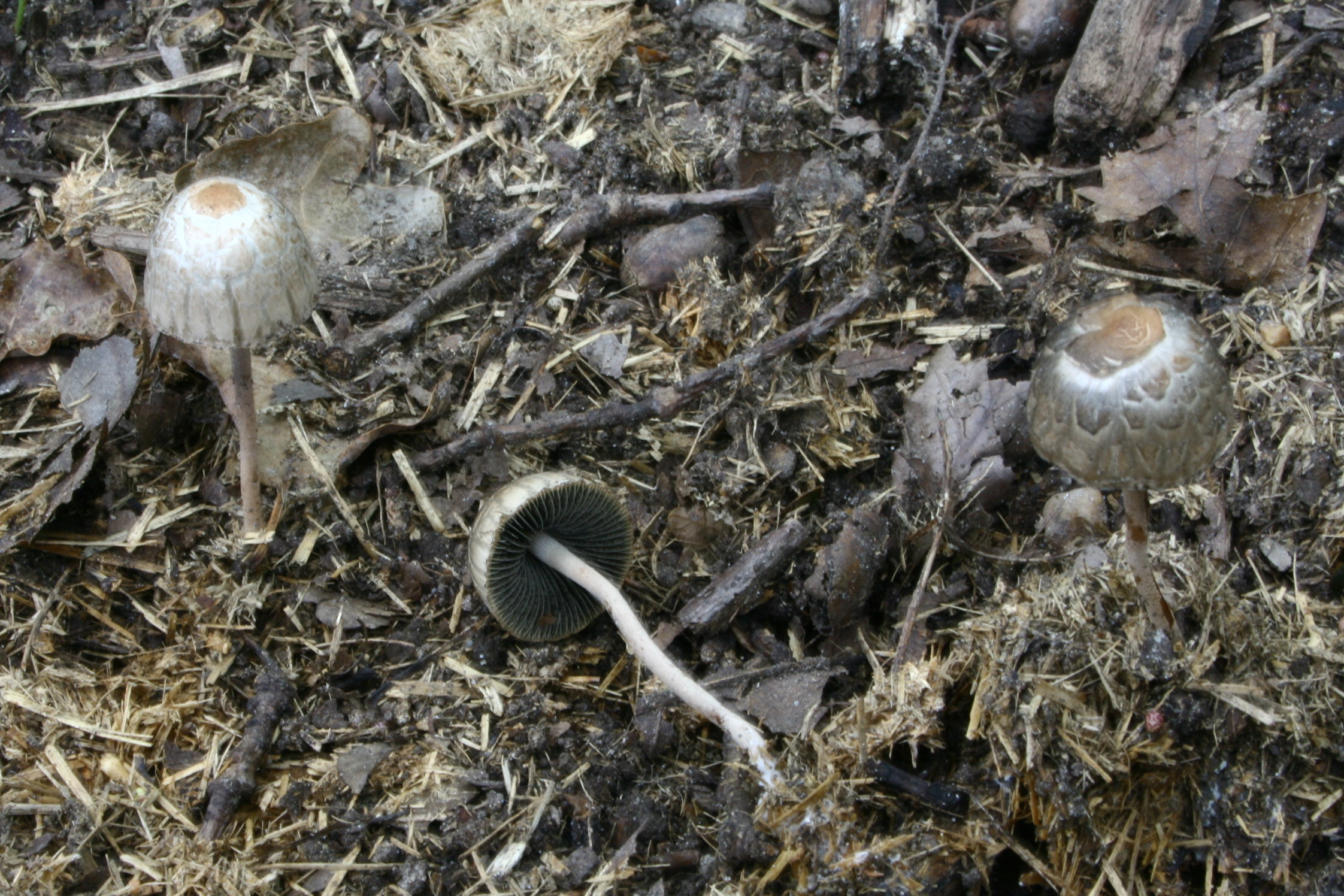

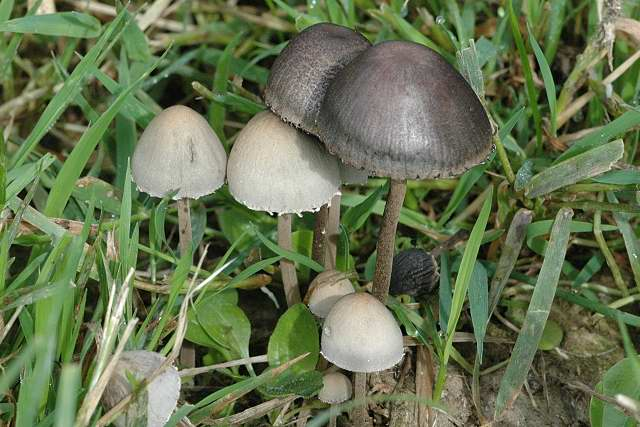

== See also ==
- List of Panaeolus species
