= Pseudoniphargus =

Scientific classification
- Domain: Eukaryota
- Kingdom: Animalia
- Phylum: Arthropoda
- Class: Malacostraca
- Order: Amphipoda
- Family: Pseudoniphargidae
- Genus: Pseudoniphargus; Chevreux, 1901

Genus of crustaceans

Pseudoniphargus is a genus of crustacean in family Pseudoniphargidae. It contains the following species:

- Pseudoniphargus adriaticus Karaman, 1955
- Pseudoniphargus affinis Notenboom, 1987
- Pseudoniphargus africanus Chevreux, 1901
- Pseudoniphargus associatus Sànchez, 1991
- Pseudoniphargus branchiatus Stock, 1980
- Pseudoniphargus brevipedunculatus Stock, 1980
- Pseudoniphargus burgensis Notenboom, 1986
- Pseudoniphargus calliaicus Notenboom, 1987
- Pseudoniphargus candelariae Sànchez, 1990
- Pseudoniphargus cazorlae Notenboom, 1987
- Pseudoniphargus cupicola Stock, 1988
- Pseudoniphargus daviui Jaume, 1991
- Pseudoniphargus duplus Messouli, Messana & Yacoubi-Khebiza, 2006
- Pseudoniphargus eborarius Notenboom, 1986
- Pseudoniphargus elongatus Stock, 1980
- Pseudoniphargus fragilis Notenboom, 1987
- Pseudoniphargus frontinalis Stock, 1988
- Pseudoniphargus gibraltaricus Notenboom, 1987
- Pseudoniphargus gomerae Stock, 1988
- Pseudoniphargus gorbeanus Notenboom, 1986
- Pseudoniphargus gracilis Notenboom, 1987
- Pseudoniphargus granadensis Notenboom, 1987
- Pseudoniphargus grandimanus Stock, Holsinger, Sket & Iliffe, 1986
- Pseudoniphargus grandis Notenboom, 1987
- Pseudoniphargus guernicae Notenboom, 1986
- Pseudoniphargus illustris Notenboom, 1987
- Pseudoniphargus incantatus Notenboom, 1986
- Pseudoniphargus inconditus Karaman & Ruffo, 1989
- Pseudoniphargus jereanus Notenboom, 1986
- Pseudoniphargus latipes Notenboom, 1987
- Pseudoniphargus leucatensis Brehier & Jaume, 2009
- Pseudoniphargus littoralis Stock & Abreu, 1993
- Pseudoniphargus longicarpus Notenboom, 1986
- Pseudoniphargus longicauda Stock, 1988
- Pseudoniphargus longiflagellum Fakhar-el-Abiari, Oulbaz, Messouli & Coineau, 1999
- Pseudoniphargus longipes Coineau & Boutin, 1996
- Pseudoniphargus longispinum Stock, 1980
- Pseudoniphargus macrotelsonis Stock, 1980
- Pseudoniphargus macrurus Stock & Abreu, 1993
- Pseudoniphargus margalefi Notenboom, 1987
- Pseudoniphargus maroccanus Boutin & Coineau, 1987
- Pseudoniphargus mateusorum Stock, 1980
- Pseudoniphargus mercadoli Pretus, 1988
- Pseudoniphargus montanus Notenboom, 1986
- Pseudoniphargus multidens Stock, 1988
- Pseudoniphargus nevadensis Notenboom, 1987
- Pseudoniphargus obritus Messouli, Messana & Yacoubi-Khebiza, 2006
- Pseudoniphargus pedrerae Pretus, 1990
- Pseudoniphargus pityusensis Pretus, 1990
- Pseudoniphargus planasiae Messouli, Messana & Yacoubi-Khebiza, 2006
- Pseudoniphargus porticola Stock, 1988
- Pseudoniphargus portosancti Stock & Abreu, 1993
- Pseudoniphargus racovitzai Pretus, 1990
- Pseudoniphargus romanorum Coineau & Boutin, 1996
- Pseudoniphargus ruffoi Coineau & Boutin, 1996
- Pseudoniphargus salinus Stock, 1988
- Pseudoniphargus semielongatus Notenboom, 1986
- Pseudoniphargus sodalis Karaman & Ruffo, 1989
- Pseudoniphargus sorbasiensis Notenboom, 1987
- Pseudoniphargus spiniferus Notenboom, 1986
- Pseudoniphargus stocki Notenboom, 1987
- Pseudoniphargus triasi Jaume, 1991
- Pseudoniphargus unisexualis Stock, 1980
- Pseudoniphargus unispinosus Stock, 1988
- Pseudoniphargus vasconiensis Notenboom, 1986
- Pseudoniphargus vomeratus Notenboom, 1987
