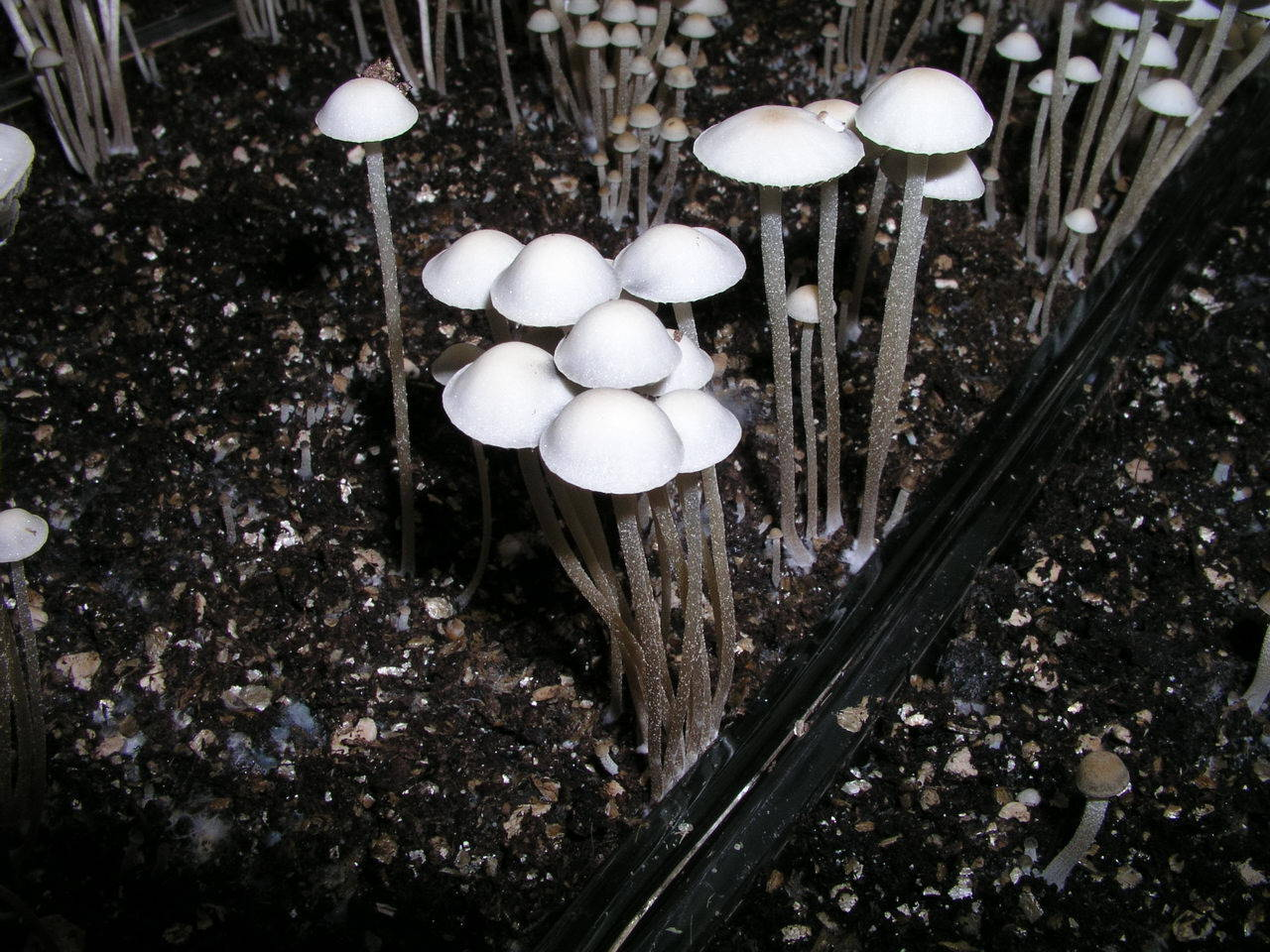

Scientific classification
- Domain: Eukaryota
- Kingdom: Fungi
- Division: Basidiomycota
- Class: Agaricomycetes
- Order: Agaricales
- Family: Bolbitiaceae
- Genus: Panaeolus
- Species: P. cambodginiensis

Binomial name
- Panaeolus cambodginiensis Ola'h & R.Heim

Synonyms
- Copelandia cambodginiensis (Ola'h & R.Heim) Singer & R.A.Weeks

= Panaeolus cambodginiensis =

Panaeolus cambodginiensis Mycological characteristics
- Gills on hymenium
- Cap is convex
- Hymenium is adnexed
- Stipe is bare
- Spore print is black
- Ecology is saprotrophic
- Edibility is psychoactive

Panaeolus cambodginiensis is a hallucinogenic mushroom that contains psilocybin and psilocin. It was described in 1979 as Copelandia cambodginiensis.

== Description ==
The cap is less than 23 mm across, with a convex shape and an incurved margin when young, expanding to broadly convex. The cap surface is smooth, often cracking with irregular fissures. The gills are gray to black. The stem is 5 to 10 centimetres (2.0 to 3.9 in) tall, 4 mm thick, and slightly swollen at the base. The spores are black, shaped like lemons, smooth, measuring 11 x 8 μm. The entire mushroom quickly bruises blue where it is handled.

It can be differentiated from the similar Panaeolus cyanescens by microscopic characteristics.

== Distribution and habitat ==
Panaeolus cambodginiensis is mushroom that grows on the dung of water buffalo and other ruminants. It was first described from Cambodia and is widespread throughout the Asian subtropics and Hawaii.

== Alkaloid content ==
A srongly bluing species, Merlin and Allen (1993) reported the presence of psilocybin and psilocin, up to .55% and .6%, respectively.

== See also ==
- List of Panaeolus species
