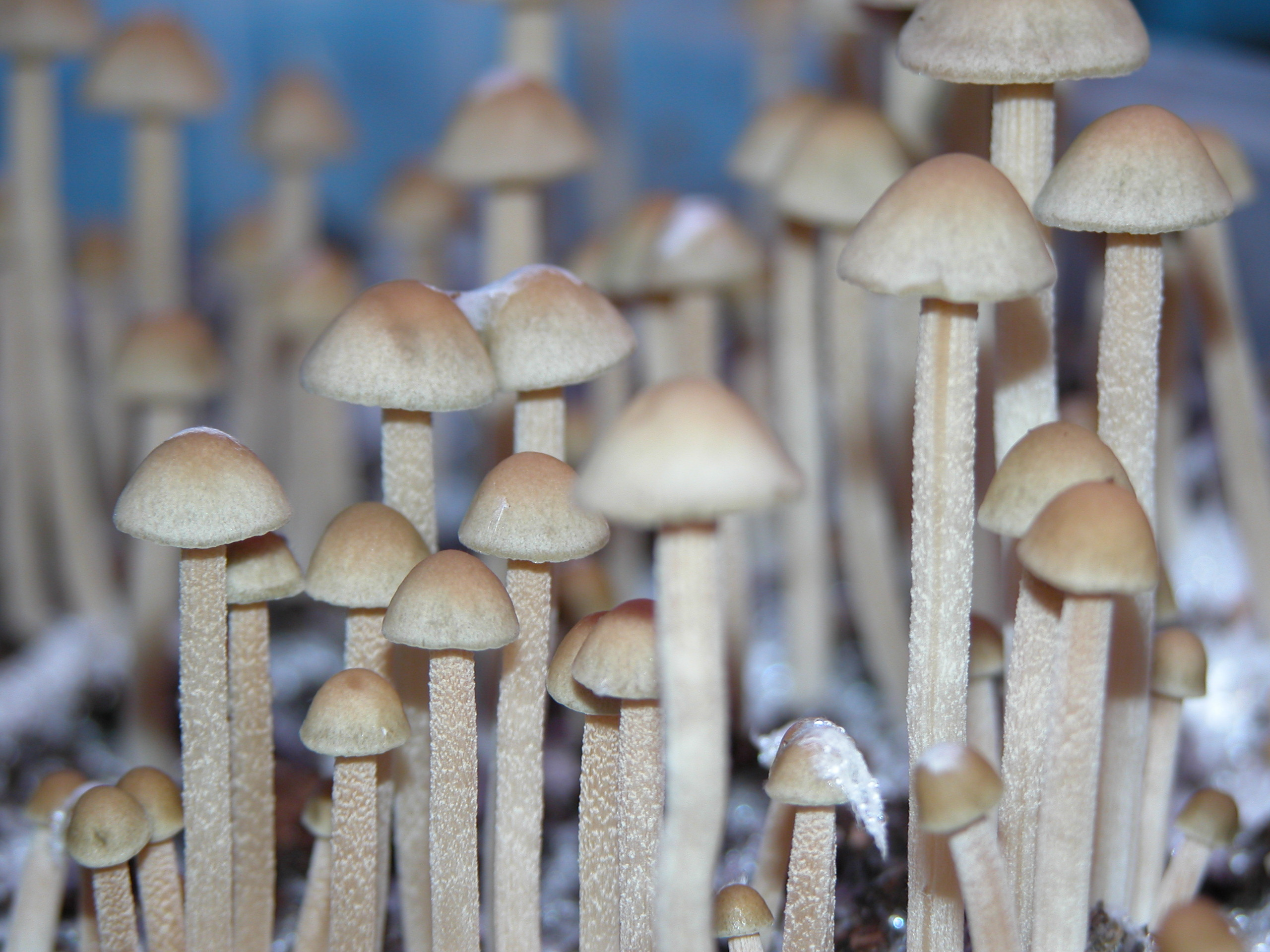

Scientific classification
- Kingdom: Fungi
- Division: Basidiomycota
- Class: Agaricomycetes
- Order: Agaricales
- Family: Bolbitiaceae
- Genus: Panaeolus
- Species: P. tropicalis

Binomial name
- Panaeolus tropicalis Ola'h

= Panaeolus tropicalis =

Panaeolus tropicalis
- Mycological characteristics
- Gills on hymenium
- Cap is convex or campanulate
- Hymenium is adnexed
- Stipe is bare
- Spore print is black
- Ecology is saprotrophic
- Edibility is psychoactive

Panaeolus tropicalis is a species of psilocybin producing mushroom in the family Bolbitiaceae. It is also known as Copelandia tropicalis.

== Description ==
The cap is 1.5 — 2(2.5) cm and hemispheric to convex to companulate. The margin is incurved when young, clay-colored, often reddish brown towards the disc, hygrophanous, smooth, and grayish to greenish; it is translucent-striate at the margin when wet. It becomes blue when bruised.
The gills are adnexed, distinctly mottled, and dully grayish with blackish spots.
The stipe is 5–12 cm long, 2–3 mm thick, hollow, and vertically striate. It is blackish towards the base, greyish towards the apex, and pallid to whitish fibrils run the length of the stipe. The stipe is equal to slightly swollen at the base and lacks a partial veil.
Panaeolus tropicalis spores are dark violet to jet black, ellipsoid, and 10.5–12.0 x 7–9 μm. The basidia each produce two spores.

Like many other hallucinogenic mushrooms, this fungus readily bruises blue where it is handled. It can be differentiated from Panaeolus cyanescens by microscopic characteristics.

== Distribution and habitat ==
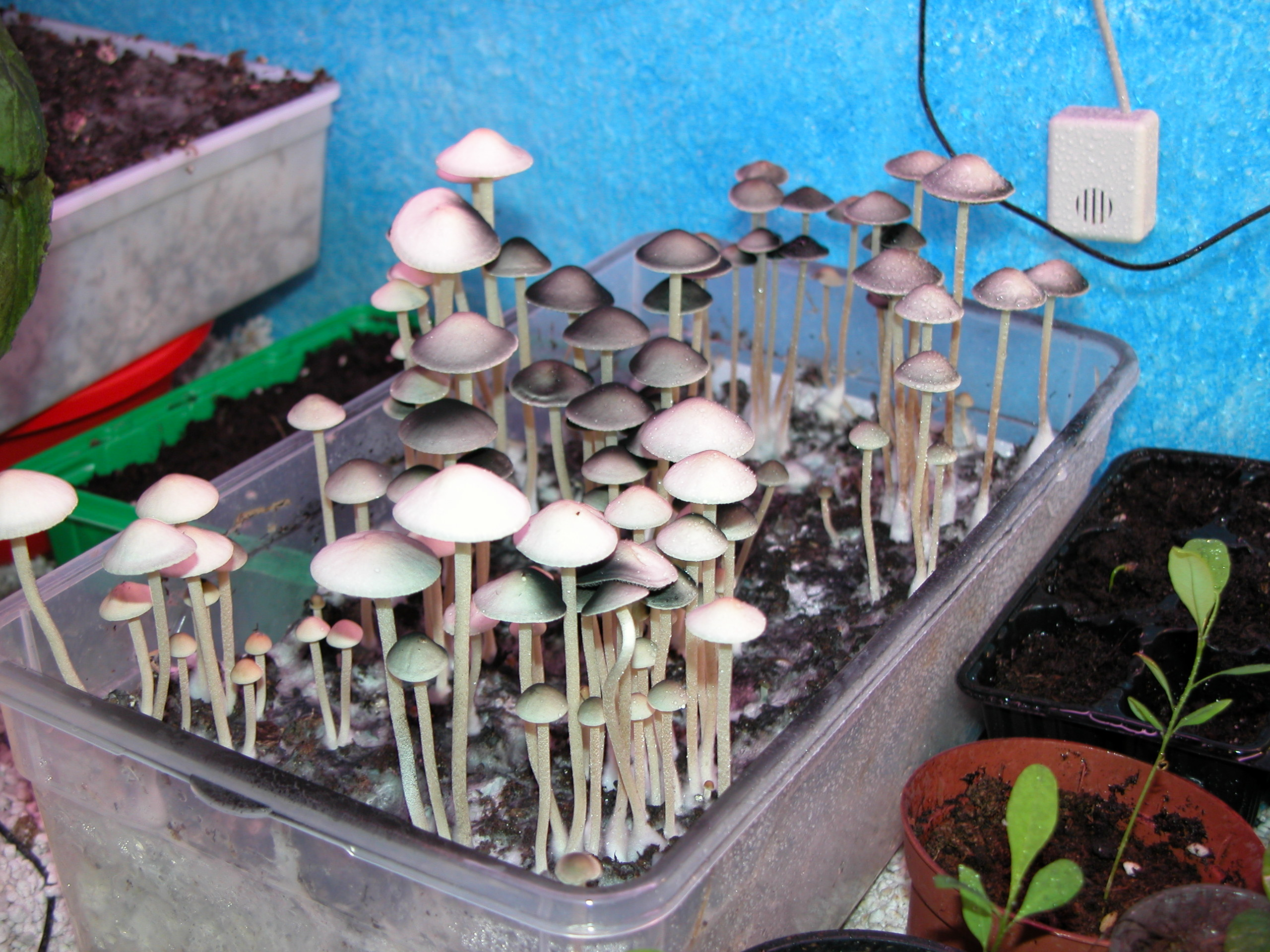
Cultivated Panaeolus tropicalis

Panaeolus tropicalis is a mushroom that grows on dung. It is most often found in Hawaii, Central Africa, and Cambodia; it can also be found in Mexico, Tanzania, the Philippines, Florida, and Japan.

== See also ==
- List of Panaeolus species
