= Panaeolus affinis =

Scientific classification
- Kingdom: Fungi
- Division: Basidiomycota
- Class: Agaricomycetes
- Order: Agaricales
- Family: Bolbitiaceae
- Genus: Panaeolus
- Species: P. affinis

Binomial name
- Panaeolus affinis (E. Horak) Ew. Gerhardt

Species of psychoactive fungus

Panaeolus affinis is a species of psychoactive mushroom belonging to the genus Panaeolus and is classified under the order Agaricales. Before the name of the species was changed in 1996, it was known as Copelandia affinis. The mushroom was first observed in 1980 by E. Horak. The mushroom contains the chemicals psilocybin and psilocin, which cause hallucinations and distorted perception of reality when ingested.

== Drug use and ingestion ==
Although Panaeolus affinis is edible, it causes psychological effects if ingested due to the presence of the psilocybin. Because of this, it has been used by various cultures for shamanistic rituals and spiritual ceremonies, as well as recreationally to induce hallucination.
