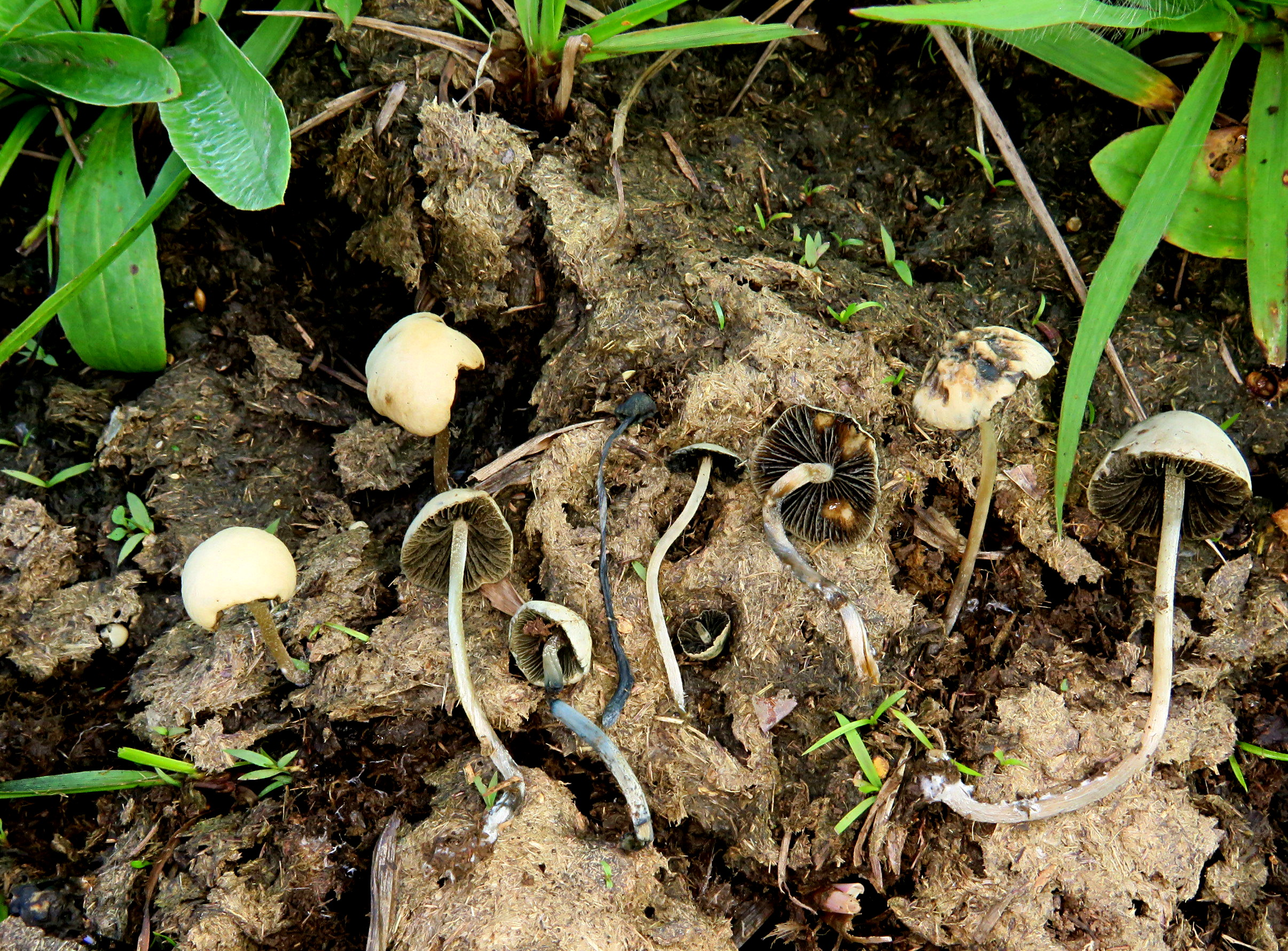
- Panaeolus cyanescens

Scientific classification
- Kingdom: Fungi
- Division: Basidiomycota
- Class: Agaricomycetes
- Order: Agaricales
- Family: Bolbitiaceae
- Genus: Panaeolus
- Species: P. cyanescens

Binomial name
- Panaeolus cyanescens (Berk. & Broome) Sacc.
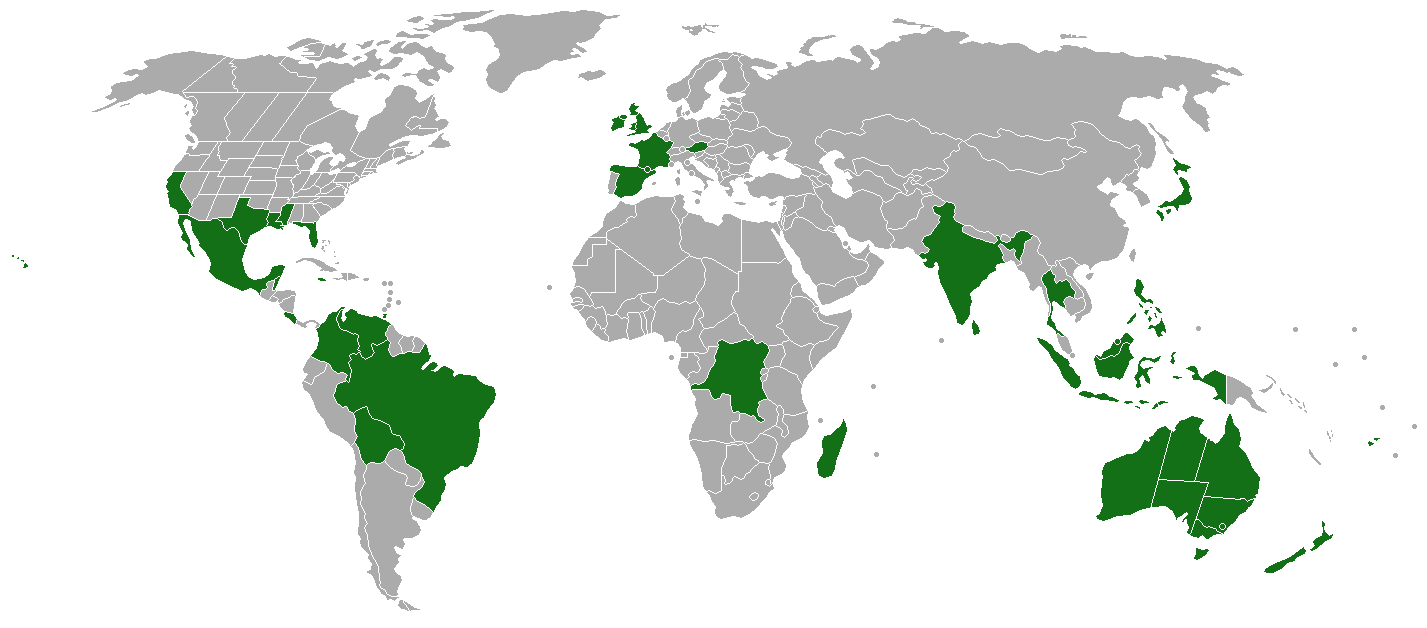
- Range of Panaeolus cyanescens

Synonyms
- Agaricus cyanescens Copelandia anomala Copelandia cyanescens Copelandia papilonacea Copelandia westii

= Panaeolus cyanescens =

Species of fungus

Panaeolus cyanescens, commonly known as the blue-staining panaeolus, (Note: It is also known under the common names of Blauender Düngerling, blue meanies, faleaitu (Samoan), falter-düngerling, Hawaiian copelandia, jambur, jamur, pulouaitu (Samoan), taepovi (Samoan), tenkech (Chol).) is a mushroom in the Bolbitiaceae family.

== Description ==
The cap is 1.5–4 centimetres (1/2–1 1/2 in) across, dry, at first hemispheric, expanding to campanulate or convex, with an incurved margin when young. Young caps start out light brown and fade to off-white or light gray at maturity, sometimes with yellowish or brownish tones. Often developing cracks in dry weather, slightly hygrophanous, turning greenish or blue where damaged.

The gills are broadly adnate to adnexed, close, starting out gray and turning black as the spores mature. The gill faces have a mottled appearance and the edges are white. The spore print is black.

The stipe is 6–12 cm long by 2 to 4 mm thick, equal to slightly enlarged at the base, pruinose, colored like the cap, staining somewhat blue where bruised.

The taste and odor are farinaceous.

=== Microscopic features ===
The spores are jet black, 12–15 x 7–11 μm, smooth, opaque, elliptical. With a germ pore.

Basidia 4 spored, pleurocystidia fusoid-ventricose, cheilocystidia 12 x 4 μm.

=== Similar species ===
It is similar to Panaeolus tropicalis.

== Distribution and habitat ==
Panaeolus cyanescens is a coprophilous (dung-inhabiting) species which occurs in both the Neotropics and Paleotropics. It has been found in Vietnam, Africa (including South Africa, Mauritius, Madagascar and Democratic Republic of the Congo), Australia, Belize, the Caribbean (Bermuda, Grenada, Barbados Jamaica, Trinidad, and Puerto Rico), Costa Rica, India, Malaysia, Indonesia, Sri Lanka, Cambodia, Thailand, Japan, Mexico, Oceania (Fiji and Samoa), the Philippines, South America (Bolivia, Brazil, Paraguay, Colombia, Venezuela, and Ecuador), South Korea, and the United States (California, Hawaii, Louisiana, Mississippi, Alabama, Florida, Tennessee, Texas, Kentucky, Virginia, Georgia, and North Carolina).

== Psychoactive properties ==
Laussmann & Meier-Giebing (2010) reported the presence of psilocybin at ~2.5% and psilocin at ~1.194% from 25 samples seized by the German government, which makes modern commercially cultivated strains of this fungus the most potent hallucinogenic mushrooms ever described in published academic research. Other researchers have documented a significant presence of serotonin and urea in this species as well as the possibly psychoplastogenic indole alkaloid baeocystin.

== See also ==
- List of Panaeolus species

== Bibliography ==
- Stamets, Paul (1996). Psilocybin Mushrooms of the World. Berkeley: Ten Speed Press. ISBN 0-9610798-0-0.
