= Hamaker =

Hamaker may refer to:

- Hendrik Arent Hamaker, Dutch orientalist
- Hugo Christiaan Hamaker, Dutch scientist responsible for Hamaker theory
- Hamaker constant, definition for a Van der Waals (VdW) body-body interaction
- Hamaker Force Interactions, sum of the attractive or repulsive forces between molecules
- John D. Hamaker, pioneer of soil remineralization
- Hamaker theory, explains the van der Waals forces between objects larger than molecules

== See also ==
- Atlee Hammaker, former Major League Baseball left-handed pitcher
- Haymaker (disambiguation)
- John Haymaker, founder of Franklin Township, Portage County, Ohio
- John Wanamaker, United States merchant
- Zoë Wanamaker, American-British actress
- Wanamaker's, department store
