= Hugo Christiaan Hamaker =

Dutch physicist (1905–1993)

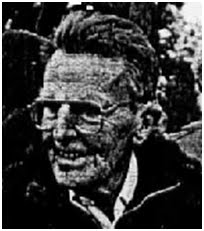
- Born: 23 March 1905; Broek op Langedijk, Netherlands
- Died: 7 September 1993 (aged 88); Eindhoven, Netherlands
- Known for: Hamaker constant Hamaker theory Hamaker's law
- Relatives: Philip Kuenen (brother-in-law); Hendrik Jacob Hamaker (grandfather)
- Awards: Shewhart Medal (1979)
- Scientific career
- Institutions: Philips Physics Laboratory; Eindhoven University of Technology
- Thesis: Reflectivity and Emissivity of Tungsten (1934)
- Doctoral advisor: Leonard Ornstein

Hugo Christiaan Hamaker (23 March 1905 – 7 September 1993), or Huug Hamaker, was a Dutch physical chemist and applied statistician. He was responsible for the Hamaker theory which explains the van der Waals forces between objects larger than molecules.

== Education and career ==
Hamaker was born in Broek op Langedijk and his father was a family doctor. His grandfather was Dutch jurist Hendrik Jacob Hamaker, who was a professor at Utrecht University. Hamaker studied experimental physics at Utrecht University and obtained his doctorandus (equivalent to a MSc degree) in 1929. In the same year, he participated in the Snellius Expedition along with geologist Philip Kuenen. He also got acquainted with Kuenen's sister Emily and they married years later.

Hamaker went on to complete his doctorate cum laude in physics at Utrecht University in 1934 under the supervision of Leonard Ornstein. His dissertation was titled Reflectivity and Emissivity of Tungsten. From 1934 to 1967, Hamaker was employed in the Philips Physics Laboratory in Eindhoven. From 1960 to 1972, he was Professor at the Eindhoven University of Technology.

== Honors and awards ==
In 1959 he was elected as a Fellow of the American Statistical Association. In 1979, he received the Shewhart Medal from the American Society for Quality. In 1982, he received the W. Edwards Demming Medal from the Union of Japanese Scientists and Engineers.

== Publications ==
Hamaker published the following papers:

- H.C. Hamaker (1934). Reflectivity and emissivity of tungsten : with a description of a new method to determine the total reflectivity of any surface in a simple and accurate way. Amsterdam: Noord-Hollandsche Uitg. Mij. x+76 pp. (PhD-thesis University of Utrecht)
- H.C. Hamaker and W.F. Beezhold (1934). Gebrauch einer Selen Sperrschicht Photo Zelle zur Messung sehr schwacher Intensit¨aten. Physica 1, 119-122.
- H.C. Hamaker (1937). The London-Van der Waals attraction between spherical particles. Physica 4(10), 1058–1072.
- H.C. Hamaker (1942). A simple and general extension of the three halves power law. Physica 9(1), 135–138.
- J.E. de Graaf and H.C. Hamaker (1942). The sorption of gases by barium. Physica 9(3), 297–309.
- H.C. Hamaker (1950). Current distribution in triodes neglecting space charge and initial velocities. Applied Scientific Research, Section B, 1(1), 77–104.
- H.C. Hamaker (1962). Applied statistics : an important phase in the development of experimental science (Inaugural lecture). Microelectronics and Reliability, 1(2), 101–109.
- H.C. Hamaker (1962). On multiple regression analyses. Statistica Neerlandica, 16(1), 31–56.
- H.C. Hamaker (1969). Nogmaals de wet en de kansspelen : commentaar op Hemelrijk's beschouwingen. Statistica Neerlandica, 23(3), 203–207.
- H.C. Hamaker (1968). Some applications of statistics in chemical and physical classroom experiments. In European Meeting on Statistics, Econometrics and Manag. Sci. (Amsterdam, the Netherlands, September 2–7, 1968).
- H.C. Hamaker (1969). De wet en de kansspelen. Statistica Neerlandica, 23(2), 179–191.
- H.C. Hamaker (1970). Over claimfrekwenties, claimbedragen en risicopremies bij de privé-autoverzekering. Het Verzekerings-archief, 47, 154–174.
- H.C. Hamaker (1971). New techniques of statistical teaching. Revue de l'Institut International de Statistique, 39(3), 351–360.
