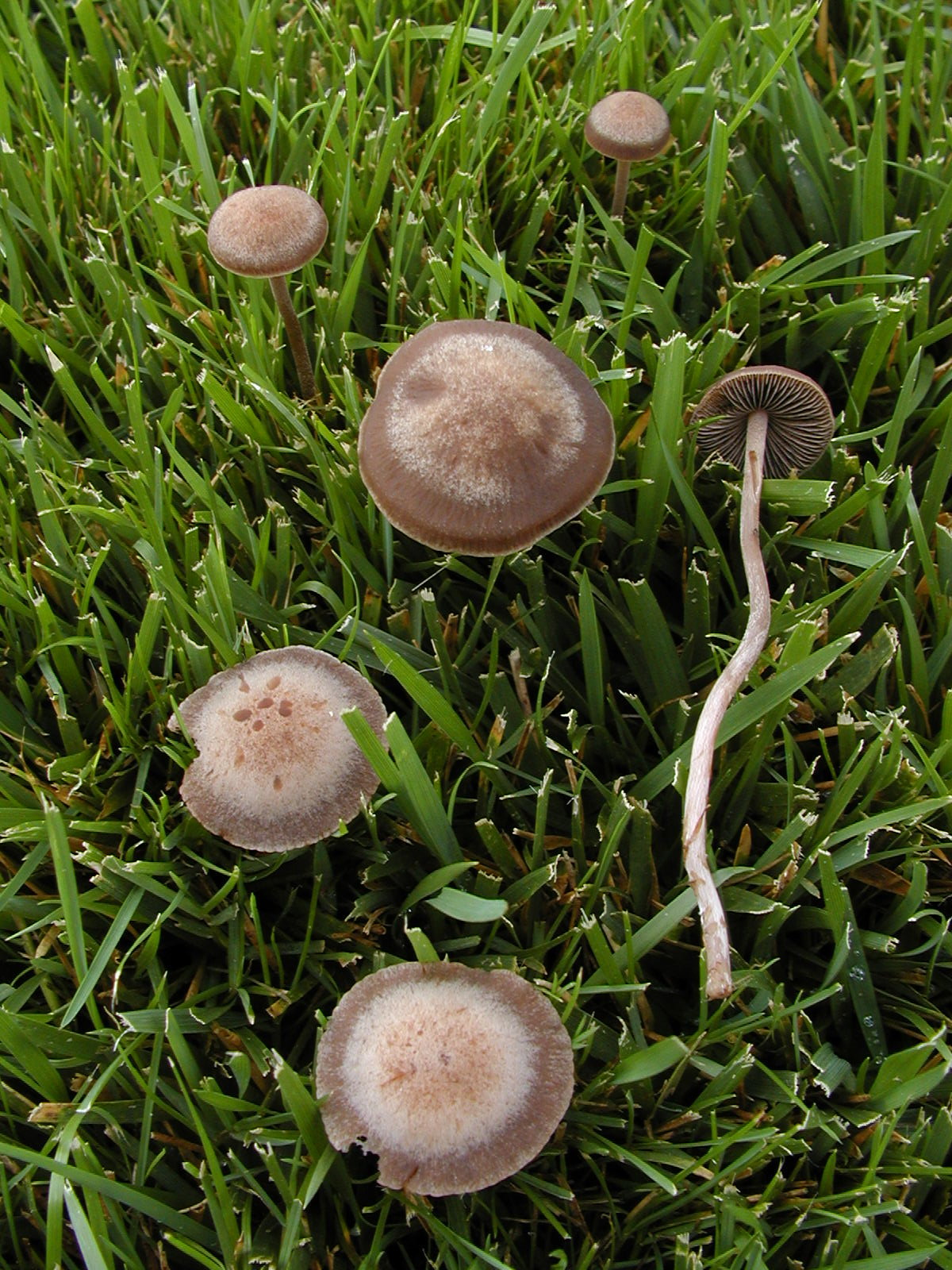
- Panaeolina cinctulus

Scientific classification
- Domain: Eukaryota
- Kingdom: Fungi
- Division: Basidiomycota
- Class: Agaricomycetes
- Order: Agaricales
- Family: Bolbitiaceae
- Genus: Panaeolina; Maire

Type species
- Panaeolina foenisecii (Persoon) Maire

= Panaeolina =

Genus of fungi

Panaeolina is a small genus of small mushrooms, containing only about four species. They are a subgroup of Panaeolus which have dark brown spores. The type species is Panaeolina foenisecii, a common lawn mushroom. Members of Panaeolina are broadly distributed throughout the world.

Some members of Panaeolina have been reported to contain the hallucinogen psilocybin, however these results are thought to be false positives.

These fungi are sometimes classified as part of the genus Panaeolus. Like that genus their gills have a cloudy/speckled/mottled appearance due to the way that their spores ripen unevenly in spots, but they are distinguished because the spores are ornamented while those of Panaeolus (in the restricted sense) are smooth. Also their gills are dark brown, instead of black or grey.

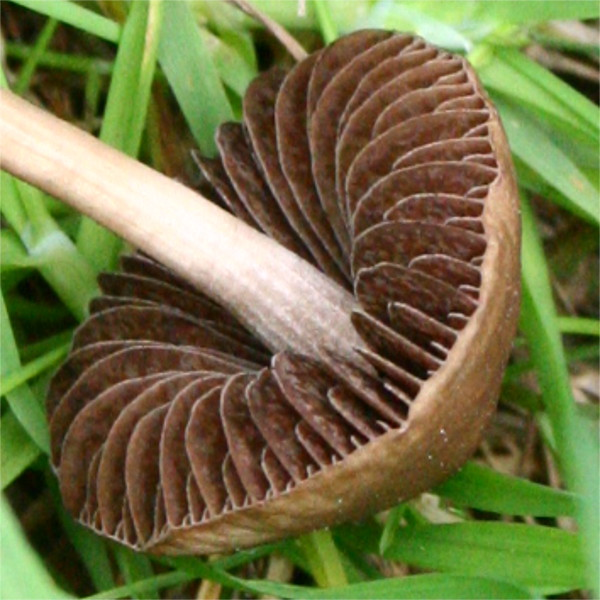
P. foenisecii, showing mottled gills, distinctive of Panaeolina, Panaeolus, and Lacrymaria.

== Species ==
Image	Name	Taxon Author	Year
	Panaeolina castaneifolia	(Murrill) Bon	1979
	Panaeolina foenisecii	(Pers.) Maire	1933
	Panaeolina indica	Sathe & J.T. Daniel	1981
	Panaeolina sagarae	Hongo	1978
