= P. olivaceus =

P. olivaceus may refer to:

- Panaeolus olivaceus, a mushroom species
- Paralichthys olivaceus, the olive flounder, a flatfish species
- Phylloscopus olivaceus, the Philippine leaf warbler, a bird species
- Picumnus olivaceus, the olivaceous piculet, a bird species
- Prionochilus olivaceus, the olive-backed flowerpecker, a bird species
- Pristimantis olivaceus, a frog species
- Psophodes olivaceus, the eastern whipbird, a bird species
