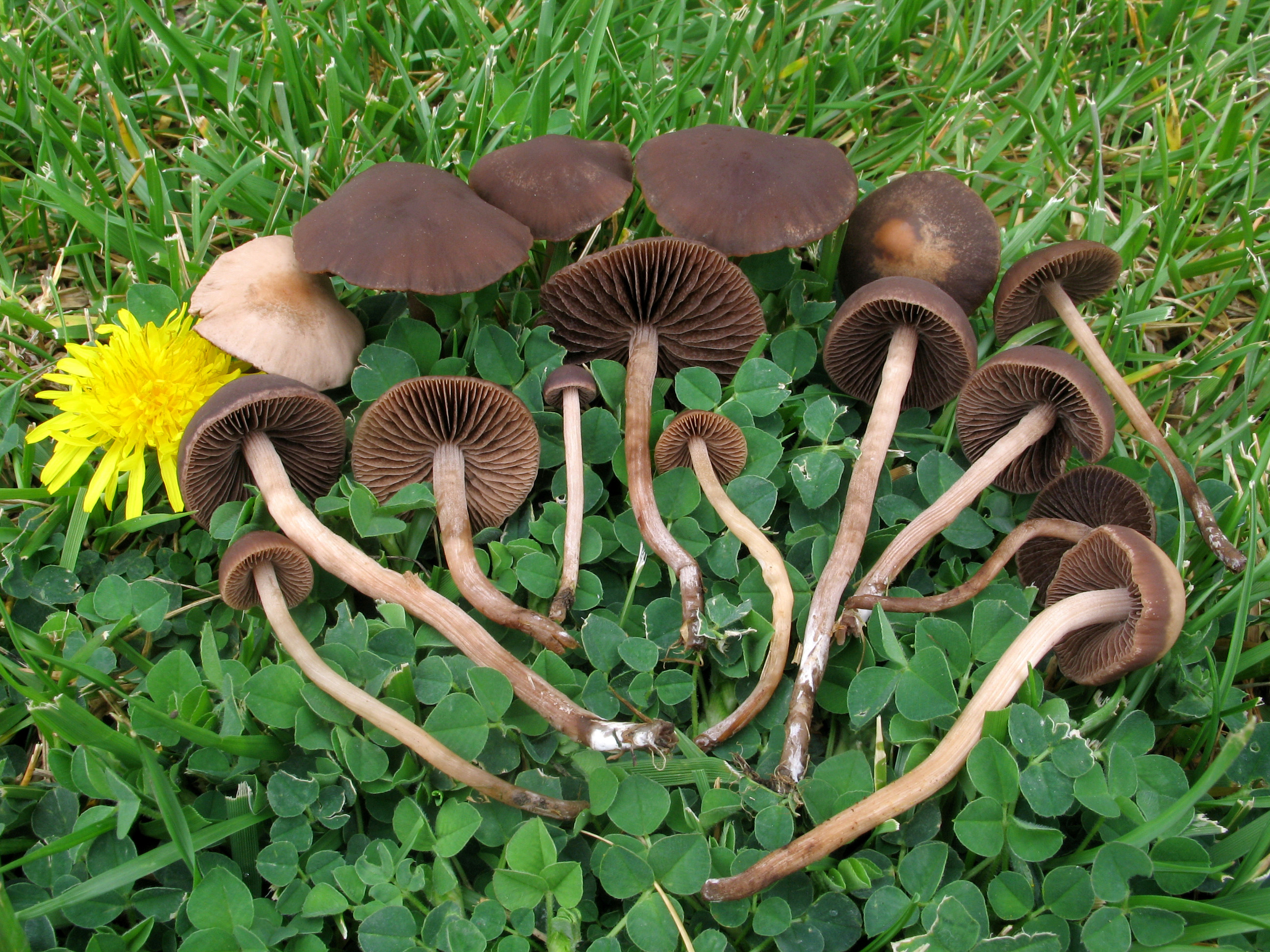
- Panaeolina castaneifolia

Scientific classification
- Domain: Eukaryota
- Kingdom: Fungi
- Division: Basidiomycota
- Class: Agaricomycetes
- Order: Agaricales
- Family: Bolbitiaceae
- Genus: Panaeolus
- Species: P. castaneifolia

Binomial name
- Panaeolus castaneifolia (Murrill) Bon

= Panaeolina castaneifolia =

Species of fungus

Panaeolina castaneifolia Mycological characteristics
- Gills on hymenium
- Cap is campanulate or convex
- Hymenium is adnexed or adnate
- Stipe is bare
- Spore print is blackish-brown
- Ecology is saprotrophic
- Edibility is unknown

Panaeolina castaneifolia is a rare and widely distributed little brown mushroom.

It has dark brown, coarsely roughened spores which resemble those of Panaeolina foenisecii.

== Description ==
- Cap: 2–4 cm (0.79–1.57 in), often with small wrinkles, hygrophanous, dark brown when moist drying to ochre buff. Often with a darker zone around the margin as it dries.
- Gills: Broad, not crowded, adnexed, dark brown.
- Stipe: 4–6 cm (1.6–2.4 in) x 4–6 mm (0.16–0.24 in), pruinose, cartilaginous, the same color as the cap or pale ochre.
- Spores: Dark purplish brown, rough. 12–16 x 7–9 micrometers, almond shaped, verrucose, with small germ pore.
- Odor: Rather strong.
- Taste: Unpleasant.
- Microscopic features: Basidia four spored, pleurocystidia look like basidia and are dark brown, cheilocystidia abundant, fusoid-ventricose or subcylindric.
- Edibility: Non-Toxic, potentially contains small quantities of psychoactive alkaloids.

== Habitat and formation ==
Panaeolina castaneifolia grows in along roadsides and grassy fields. This species was first found in New York City and has been documented as far south as Texas. This mushroom is often mistaken for Panaeolina foenisecii, and has similar microscopic features but can be distinguished by its thicker stem and more unpleasant taste. It also resembles Panaeolus subbalteatus and can be distinguished from that species by its roughened brown spores.
