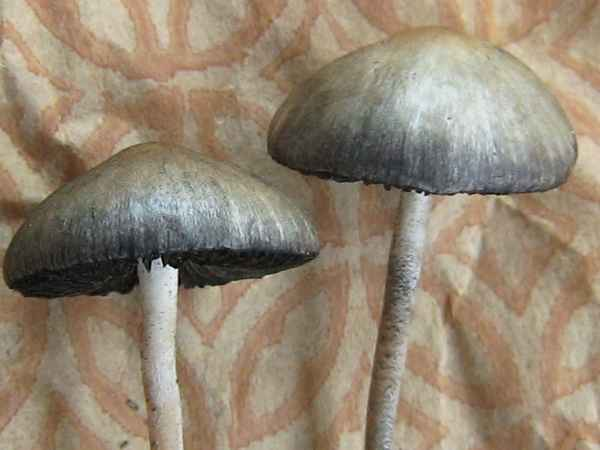

Scientific classification
- Kingdom: Fungi
- Division: Basidiomycota
- Class: Agaricomycetes
- Order: Agaricales
- Family: Bolbitiaceae
- Genus: Panaeolus
- Species: P. olivaceus

Binomial name
- Panaeolus olivaceus F.H.Møller (1945)

Synonyms
- Panaeolus castaneifolius

= Panaeolus olivaceus =

Panaeolus olivaceus Mycological characteristics
- Gills on hymenium
- Cap is campanulate or convex
- Hymenium is adnexed or adnate
- Stipe is bare
- Spore print is black
- Ecology is saprotrophic
- Edibility is psychoactive

Panaeolus olivaceus is a widely distributed, rarely identified, little brown mushroom that contains the hallucinogen psilocybin. It is often mistaken for Panaeolus foenisecii and is distinguished by its black spore print and darker gill coloration when mature alongside a slightly thicker stem. It is even more easily mistaken for Panaeolus cinctulus or Panaeolus fimicola and can be distinguished from them both by its slightly roughened spores. It is also easily confused with Panaeolina castaneifolia, a species which has spores that are dark brown and significantly more roughened.

== Description ==
- Cap: 1 — 4 cm across, Distinctly campanulate then subhemispheric to convex, becoming broadly conic, not fully expanding, incurved margin when young, dark smoky-grayish to dark cinnamon, drying to a straw-yellow or slightly olive-gray color, remaining more reddish-brown towards the center, hygrophanous, smooth, sometimes striated or finely corrugated, flesh thick and firm.
- Gills: Adnate to adnexed, close, thin, pallid, mottled, slightly olive-greenish, becoming dark purplish gray-black in age, edge whitish.
- Stipe: 4 — 7.5 cm by 3 — 6 mm thick, equal to slightly tapering at the base, hollow, brittle, pruinose and slightly striate, no veil remnants. Grayish to ochraceous, tan or purple at the base.
- Spores: Black, slightly roughened, 12 — 17 x 7 — 10 micrometers, elliptic, rugose or verrucose.
- Microscopic features: Basidia 24 — 28 x 10 - 12 micrometers. Cheilocystidia 20 — 38 x 5 — 10 micrometers, abundant, neck often flexuous and apices usually obtuse, thin walled and hyaline, pleurocystidia rare or absent, not projecting beyond plane of basidia.

== Habitat and formation ==
Panaeolus olivaceus grows scattered to gregariously in rich grassy areas, from late summer through December, across North and South America, likely more widely distributed; it has been collected in the U.S. states of Washington, Oregon, Florida, Georgia, South Carolina, Minnesota, Canada's Quebec, New Zealand and in the United Kingdom.

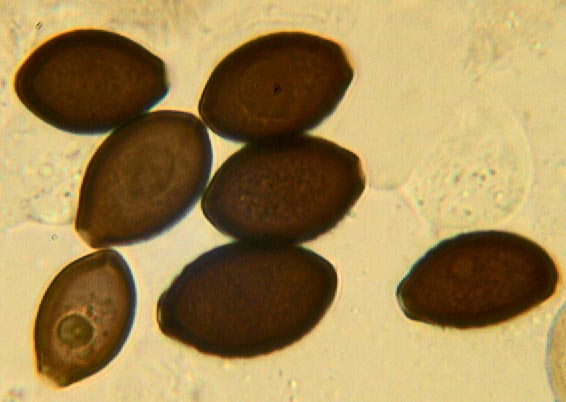
Panaeolus olivaceus spores

== Gallery ==
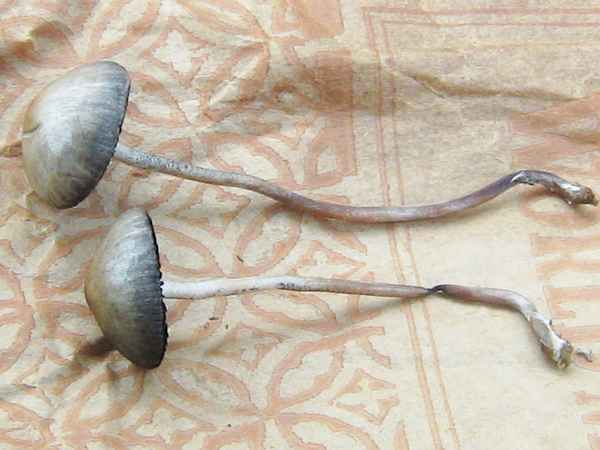
Panaeolus olivaceus

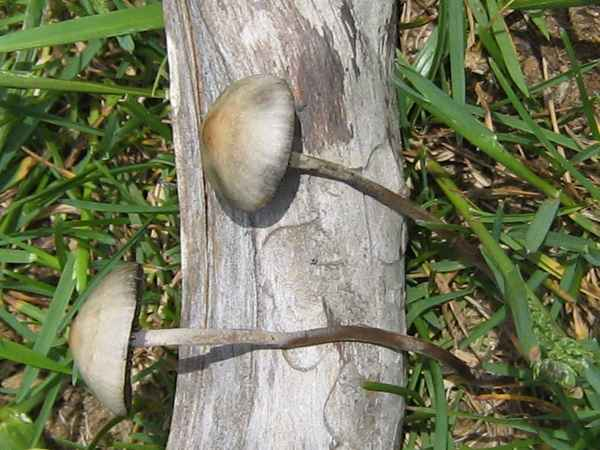
Panaeolus olivaceus

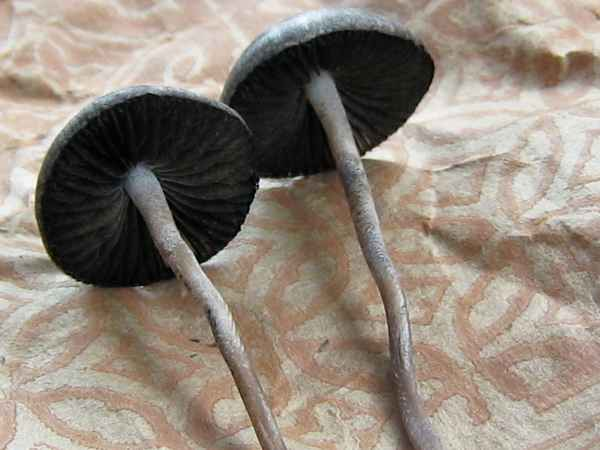
Panaeolus olivaceus

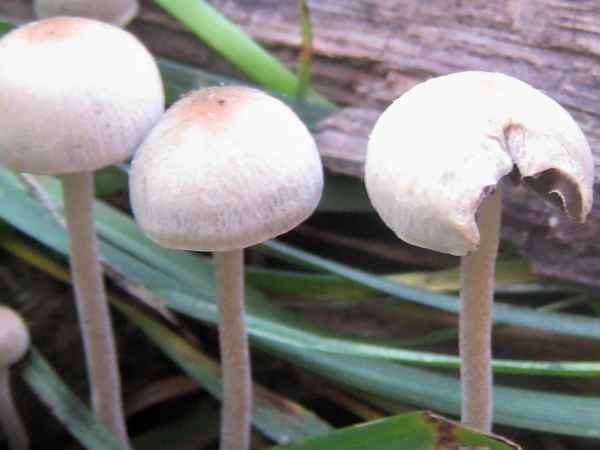
Panaeolus olivaceus

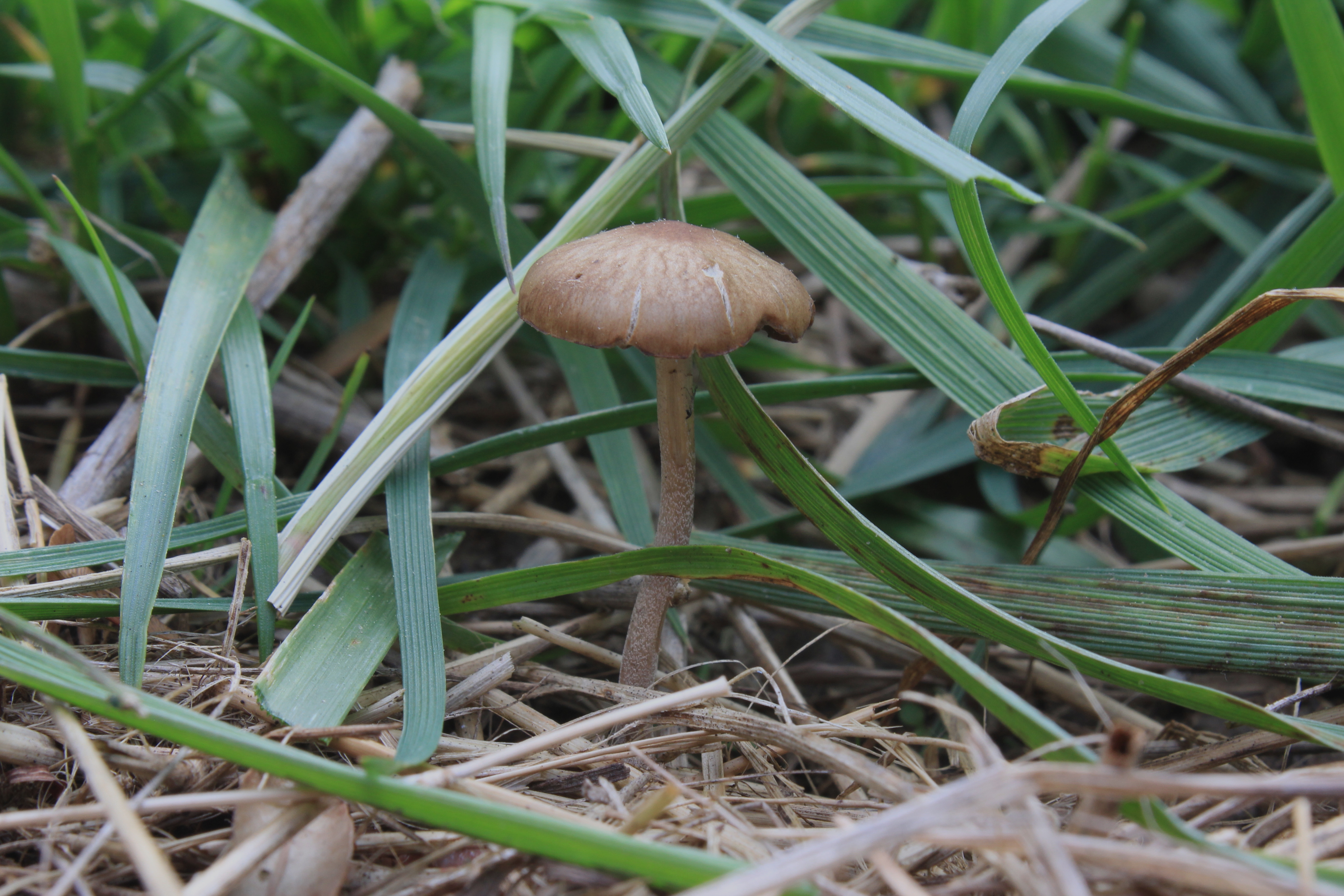
Panaeolus olivaceus

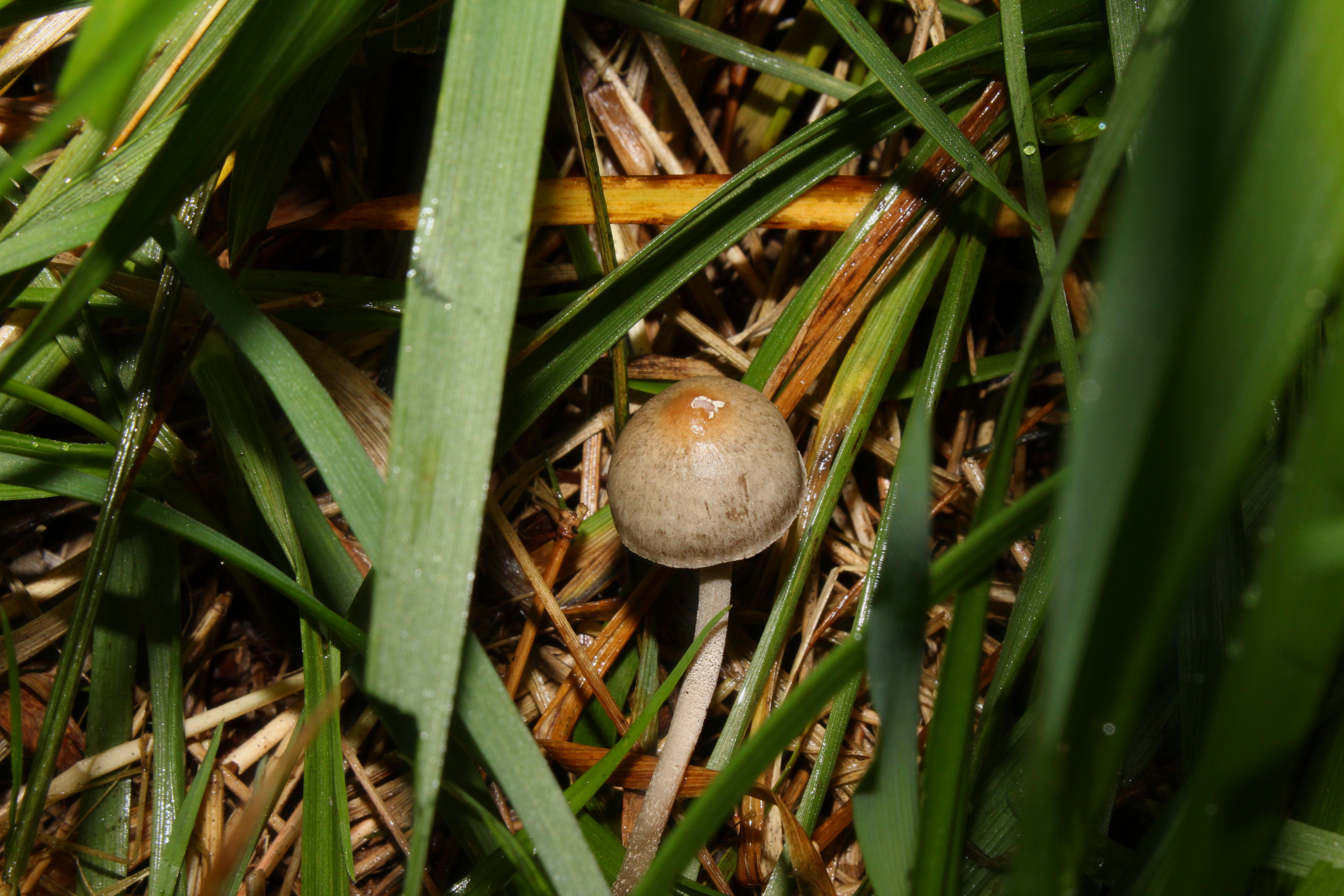
Panaeolus olivaceus

== See also ==
- List of Panaeolus species
