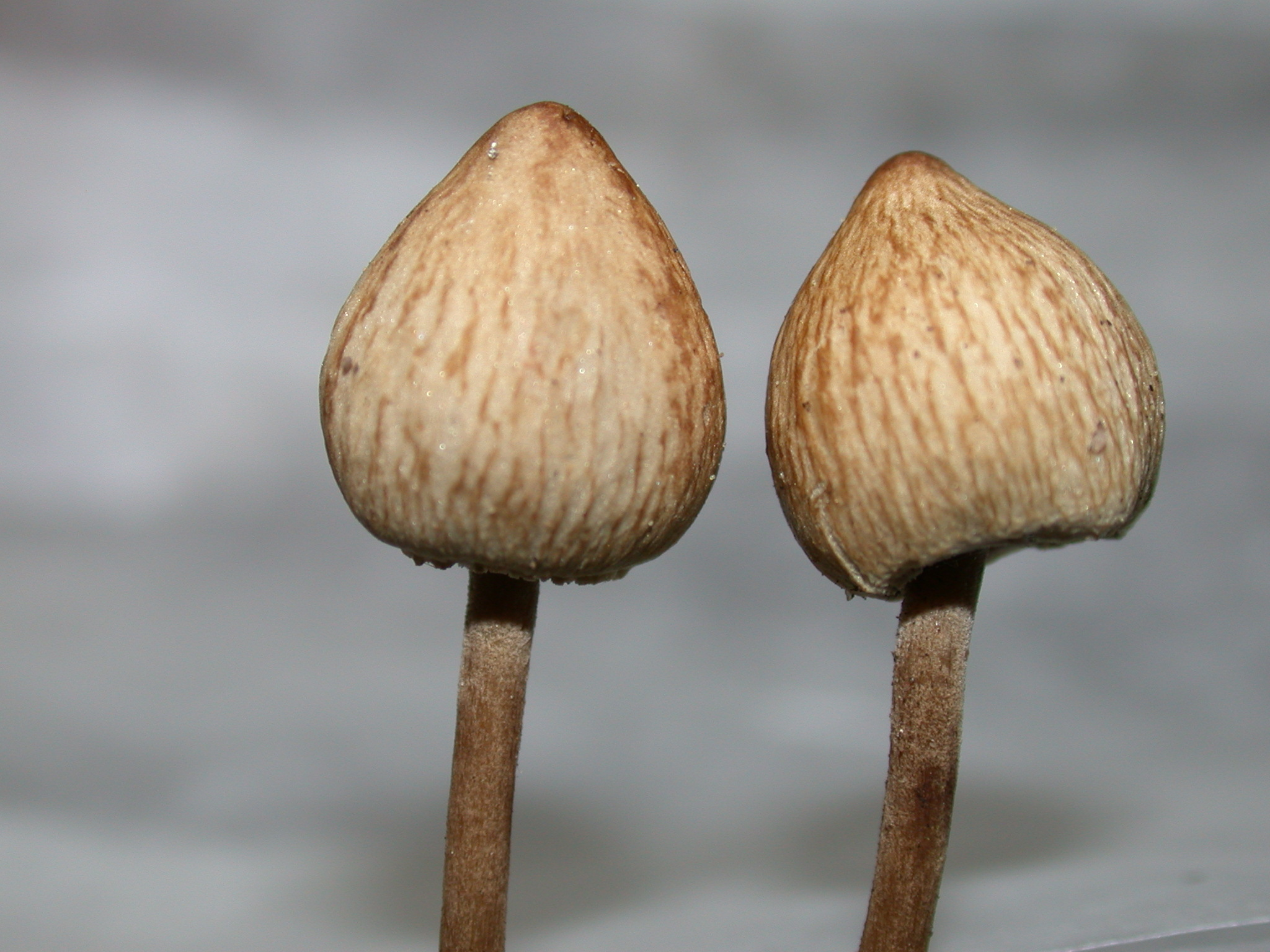

Scientific classification
- Kingdom: Fungi
- Division: Basidiomycota
- Class: Agaricomycetes
- Order: Agaricales
- Family: Bolbitiaceae
- Genus: Panaeolus
- Species: P. papilionaceus
- Variety: P. p. var. parvisporus

Trinomial name
- Panaeolus papilionaceus var. parvisporus Ewald Gerhardt

Synonyms
- Panaeolus campanulatus sensu auct. brit. Panaeolus retirugis sensu auct. brit.

= Panaeolus papilionaceus var. parvisporus =

Variety of fungus

Panaeolus papilionaceus var. parvisporus
- Mycological characteristics
- Gills on hymenium
- Cap is convex
- Hymenium is adnexed
- Stipe is bare
- Spore print is black
- Ecology is saprotrophic
- Edibility is choice or psychoactive

Panaeolus papilionaceus var. parvisporus is a little brown mushroom that grows in horse or cow dung and is in the genus Panaeolus.

== Description ==
The cap is up to 5 cm across, grayish brown, not hygrophanous, conic to campanulate in age. The cap margin is not adorned with remnants of the partial veil. The stem is 10 cm by 2.5 mm, fibrous and pruinose. The gills are adnexed and close, with one or two tiers of intermediate gills.

Some collections are allegedly mildly psychoactive, containing psilocybin.

== Edibility ==
Though neither particularly choice in flavor nor substantial in mass, it is nonetheless edible. No member of the genus Panaeolus is known to be toxic.
