= Haymaker =

Haymaker may refer to:

== Sports ==
- Troy Haymakers, a name used by several professional baseball clubs
- Lincoln Haymakers, a 2004–2014 indoor football team based in Lincoln, Nebraska, U.S.
- The sports teams of the former Phillips University, Enid, Oklahoma, U.S.
- Pennsylvania Haymakers, a 2011–2012 American indoor lacrosse team, Pennsylvania, U.S.
- Mansfield Haymakers, the 1897–1900 name of the Mansfield Pioneers
- A type of boxing punch, a wild swing with all of a person's might to knock out the opponent
  - David Haye (born 1980), a British boxing world champion nicknamed "The Hayemaker," after the punch

== Other uses ==
- Conditioner (farming), a type of farm machine that treats hay to cause more rapid and even drying
- Haymaker (album), a 2003 album by the American metal band Throwdown
- Haymaker (band), a Canadian country rock band
- Haymaker Hall, a residence hall at Kansas State University, Manhattan, Kansas, U.S.
- Panaeolina foenisecii or Haymaker, a common species of mushroom
- John Haymaker, early American settler in Ohio regarded as the founder of Kent, Ohio, U.S.
- Haymakers (painting), a 1785 painting by George Stubbs
- "Haymakers", a track by Paul McCartney from the album Working Classical
