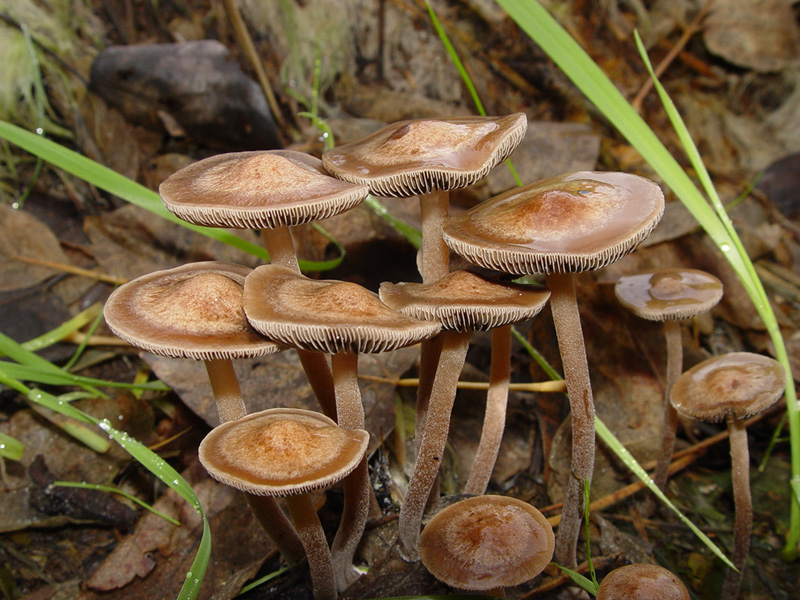

Scientific classification
- Kingdom: Fungi
- Division: Basidiomycota
- Class: Agaricomycetes
- Order: Agaricales
- Family: Bolbitiaceae
- Genus: Panaeolus
- Species: P. cinctulus

Binomial name
- Panaeolus cinctulus (Bolton) Saccardo (1887)
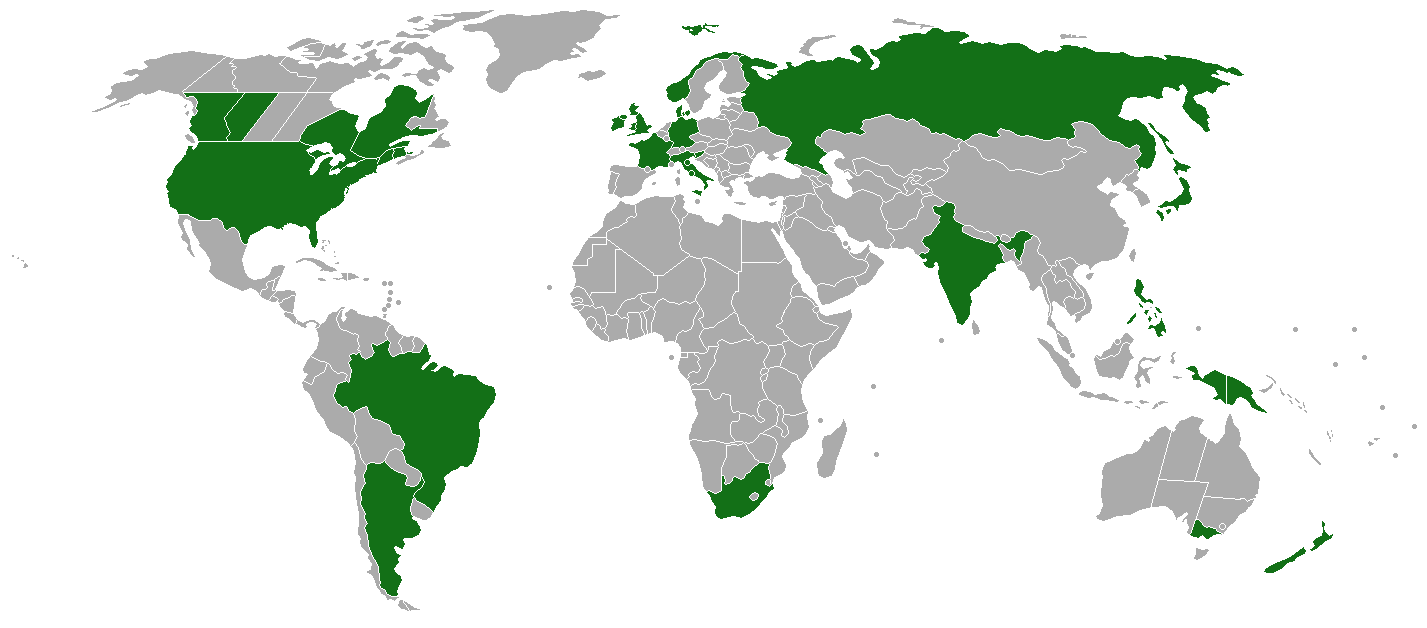
- Approximate Panaeolus cinctulus range

Synonyms
- Agaricus cinctulus Bolton (1791); Coprinus cinctulus (Bolton) Gray (1821); Agaricus fimicola var. cinctulus (Bolton) Cooke (1883); Panaeolus fimicola var. cinctulus (Bolton) Rea (1922); Agaricus subbalteatus Berk. & Broome (1861); Panaeolus subbalteatus (Berk. & Broome) Sacc. (1887); Panaeolus alveolatus Peck (1902); Panaeolus acidus Sumstine (1905); Campanularius semiglobatus Murrill (1911); Panaeolus semiglobatus (Murrill) Sacc. & Trottcr (1925); Panaeolus rufus Overh. (1916); Panaeolus variabilis Overh. (1916); Panaeolus venenosus Murrill (1916); Psilocybe vernalis Velen. (1921); Campanularius pumilus Murrill (1942); Panaeolus pumilus (Murrill) Murrill (1942); Panaeolus dunensis Bon & Courtec (1983)

= Panaeolus cinctulus =

Panaeolus cinctulus
- Mycological characteristics
- Gills on hymenium
- Cap is campanulate or convex
- Hymenium is adnate or adnexed
- Stipe is bare
- Spore print is black
- Ecology is saprotrophic
- Edibility is psychoactive

Panaeolus cinctulus, syn. P. subbalteatus, commonly known as the belted panaeolus, banded mottlegill, or subbs, is a very common, widely distributed psilocybin mushroom.

== Etymology ==
The descriptor subbalteatus comes from the Latin words sub ('somewhat') and balteat ('girdled'), a reference to the dark outer band of the cap.

== Description ==
The cap is 1.5–6 centimetres (1/2–2 1/2 in) wide, hemispherical to convex when young to broadly umbonate or plane in age, smooth, hygrophanous, striking cinnamon-brown when moist, soot-black when wet which disappears as the mushroom completely dries out. The outer band is usually darker. The flesh is thin and brownish.

The gills are close, adnate to adnexed, cream-colored when young, later mottled dingy brown then to soot-black. The gill edges are white and slightly fringed, but turn blackish when fully mature. The spore print is black.

The stipe is 4–10 cm long, 1–10 mm thick, equal or tapered at the ends, reddish brown or covered by whitish powder, hollow, no veil remnants, longitudinally white-fibrillose, striate at the apex or twisting vertically down the entire length of the stipe. The stem base and mycelium occasionally stain blue.

The taste is farinaceous (like flour) when fresh, saliferous (salty) when dried. The odor is slightly farinaceous.

=== Microscopic features ===
The spores are 11–14 x 7.5–9.5 μm, smooth, elliptical to rhomboid in face view, thick-walled, elliptical in side view.

=== Similar species ===
Morphologically, P. cinctulus can be easily confused with other species of psilocybin mushrooms. They have a resemblance to P. fimicola and prefer the same habitats, but the latter species has sulphidia on the gill faces.

It can also resemble P. foenisecii and P. olivaceus.

== Habitat and formation ==
Panaeolus cinctulus is a cosmopolitan species that grows solitary to gregarious to cespitose (densely clumped) on compost piles, well-fertilized lawns and gardens, and, rarely, directly on horse dung. It grows from spring to fall, abundantly after rain. It can be found in many regions, including: Africa (South Africa), Austria, Canada (Alberta, British Columbia, New Brunswick, Prince Edward Island, Ontario, Quebec, Nova Scotia), Denmark, Finland, France, Germany, Great Britain, Guadeloupe, Estonia, Iceland, India, Ireland, Italy, South Korea, Japan, Mexico, New Guinea, New Zealand, Norway, Philippines, Russia, Romania , Slovenia, South America (Argentina, Chile, Brazil) and the United States (common in Oregon, Alaska, Washington, and both northern and southern California, but known to occur in all 50 states).

According to American mycologist David Arora, P. cinctulus is the most common psilocybin mushroom in California.

It has also been sighted in Melbourne, Australia, Central Queensland, Australia Belgium and the Czech Republic.

== Legality ==
The legal status of psilocybin mushrooms varies worldwide. Psilocybin and psilocin are listed as Class A (United Kingdom) or Schedule I (US) drugs under the United Nations 1971 Convention on Psychotropic Substances. The possession and use of psilocybin mushrooms, including P. cinctulus, is therefore prohibited by extension. However, in many national, state, and provincial drug laws, there is a great deal of ambiguity about the legal status of psilocybin mushrooms and the spores of these mushrooms. Panaeolus cinctulus is mildly psychoactive.

== In culture ==
During the early 1900s, these species were referred to as the "weed Panaeolus" because they were commonly found in beds of the commercially grown, grocery-store mushroom Agaricus bisporus. Mushroom farmers had to weed it out from the edible mushrooms because of the psilocybin content.

== Gallery ==
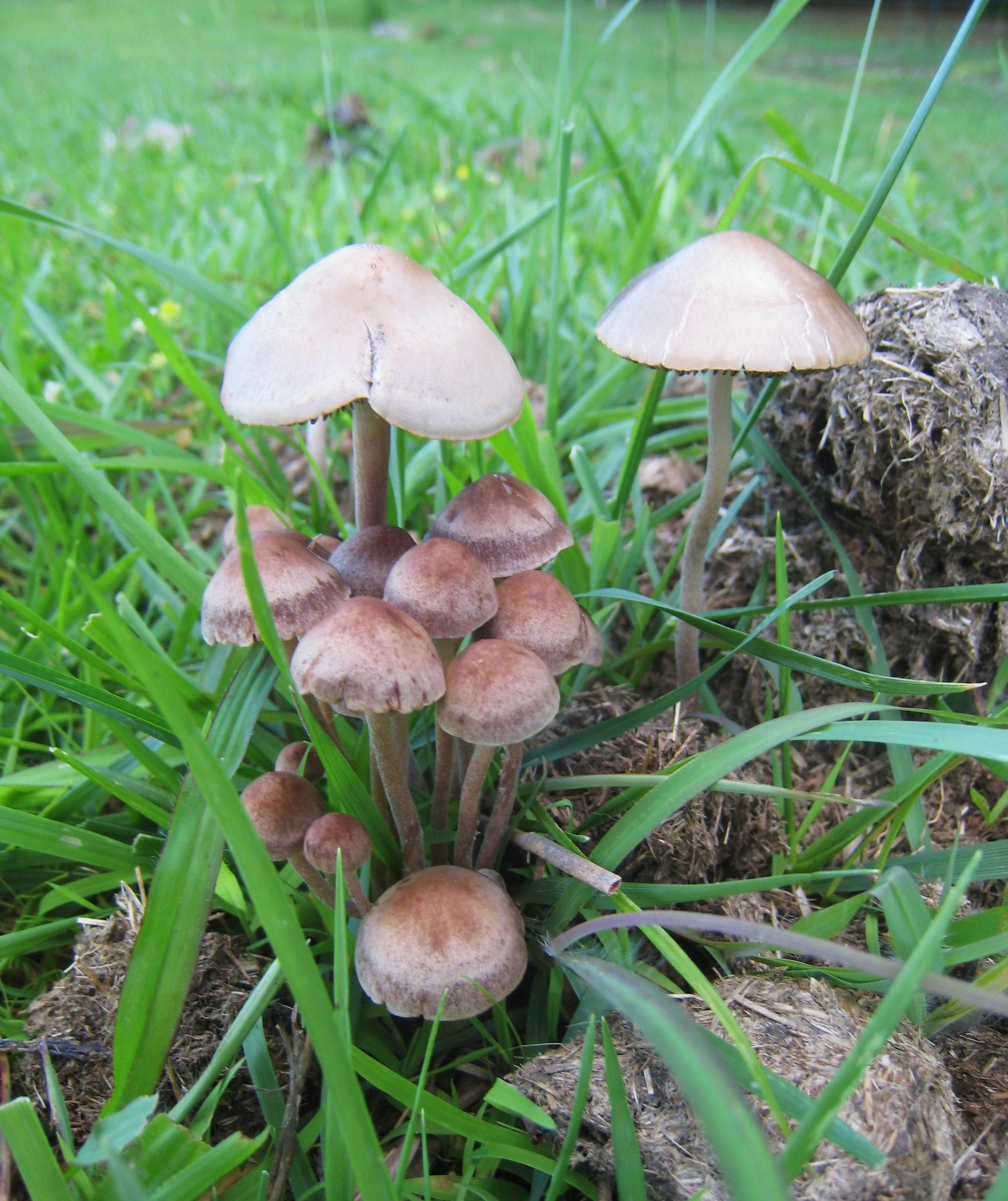
Panaeolus cinctulus

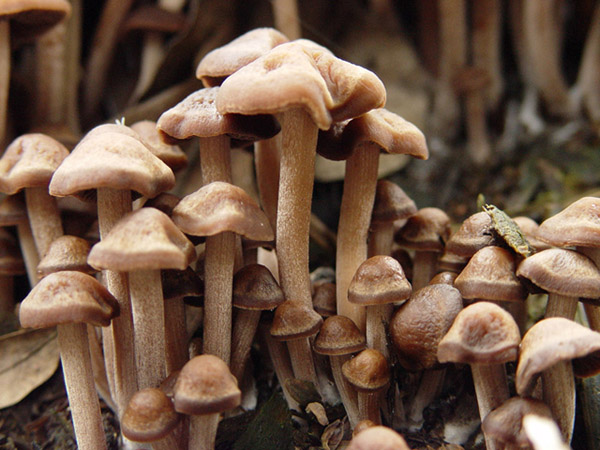
Panaeolus cinctulus

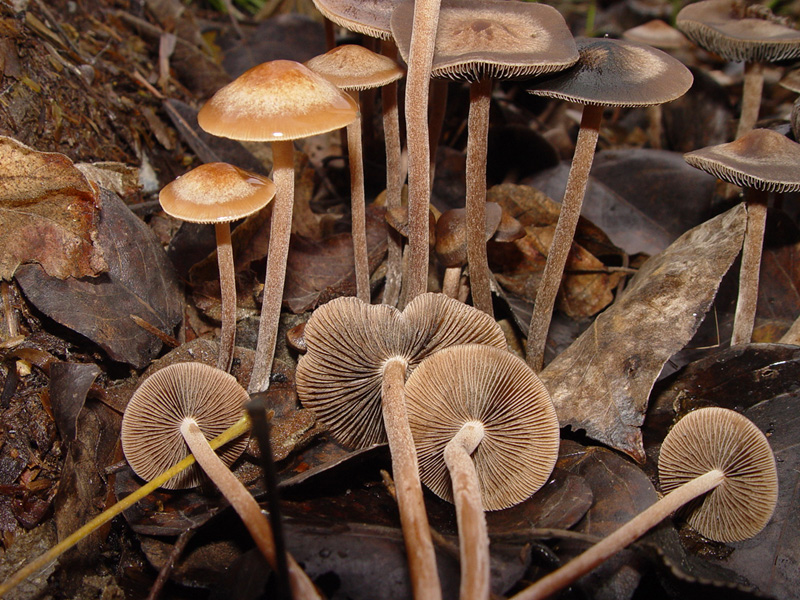
Panaeolus cinctulus

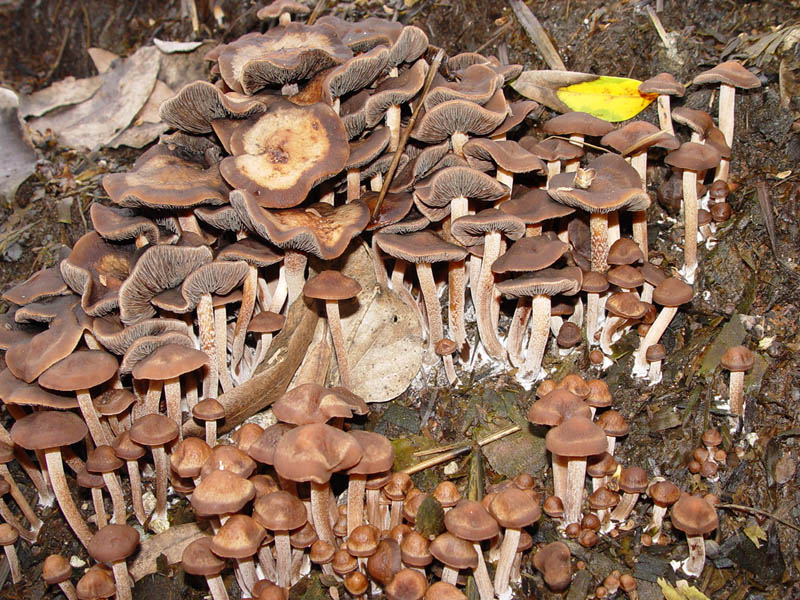
Panaeolus cinctulus

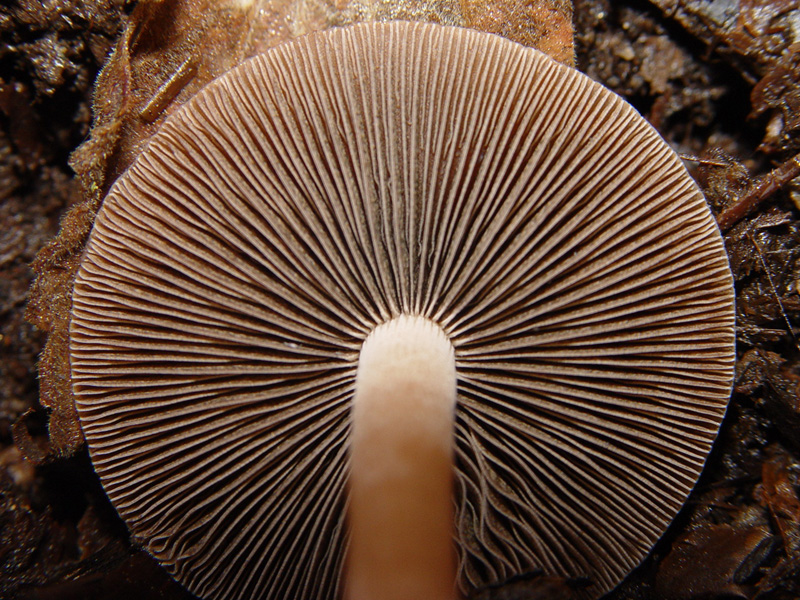
Panaeolus cinctulus

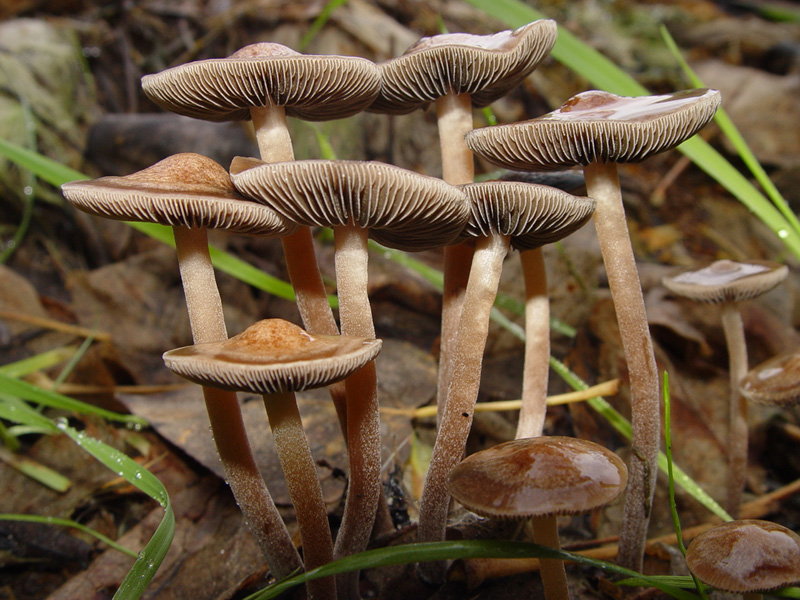
Panaeolus cinctulus

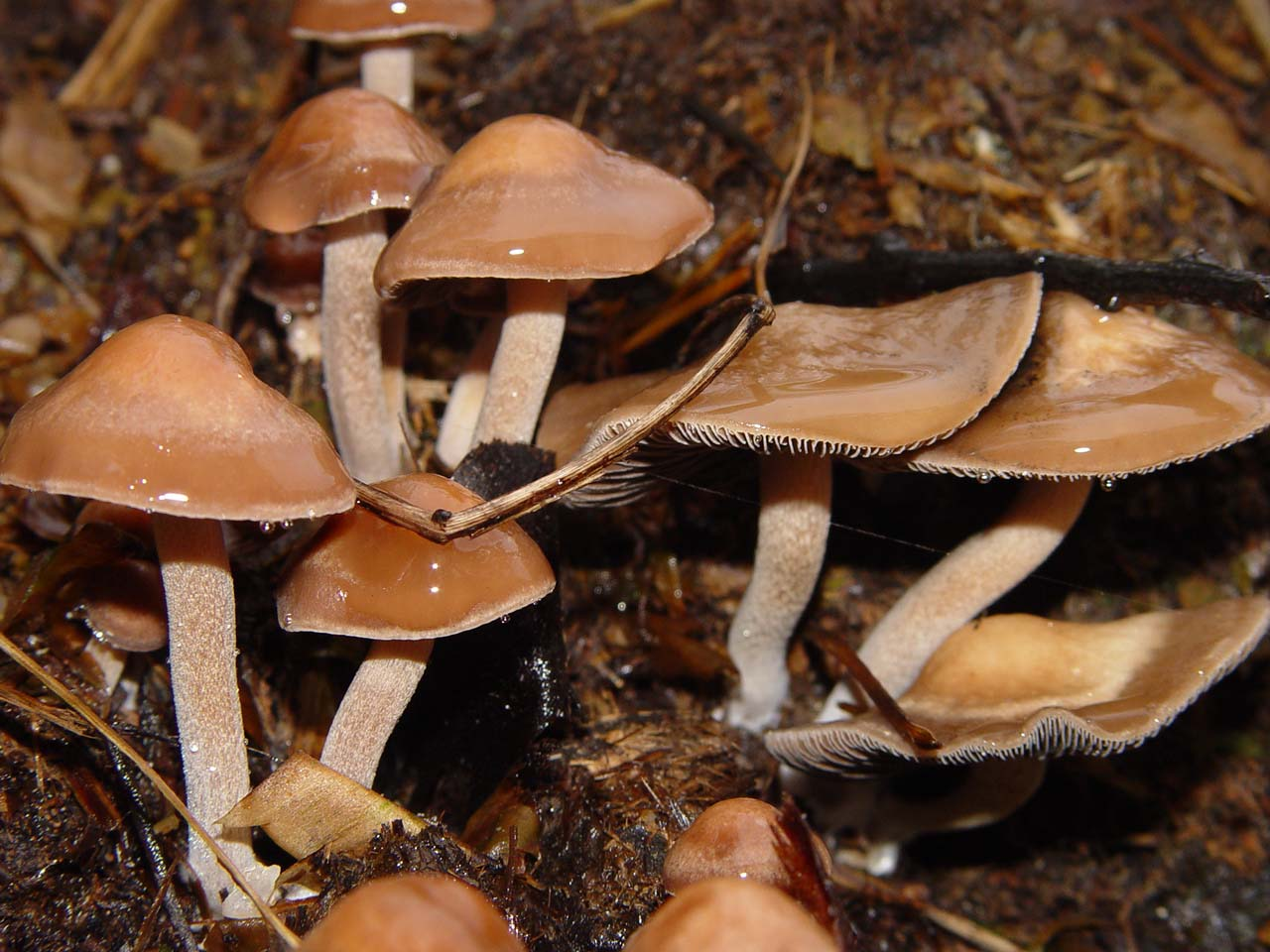
Panaeolus cinctulus

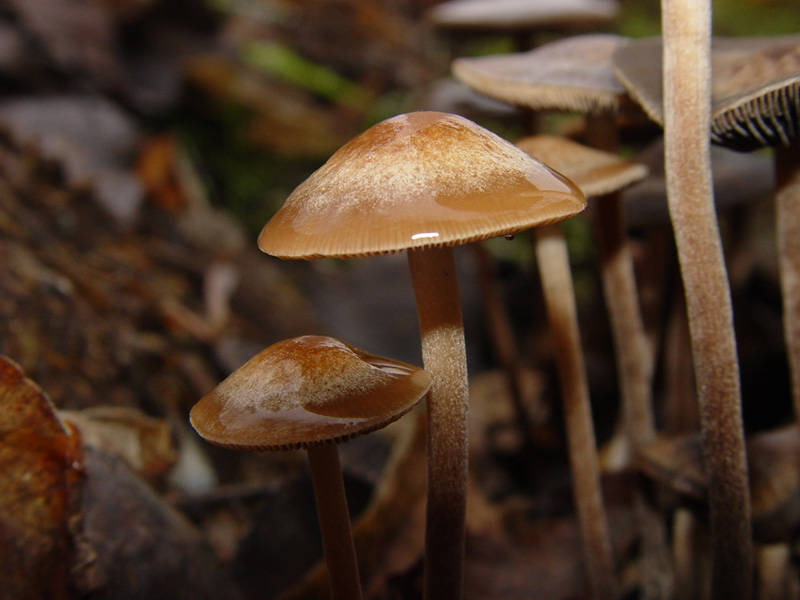
Panaeolus cinctulus

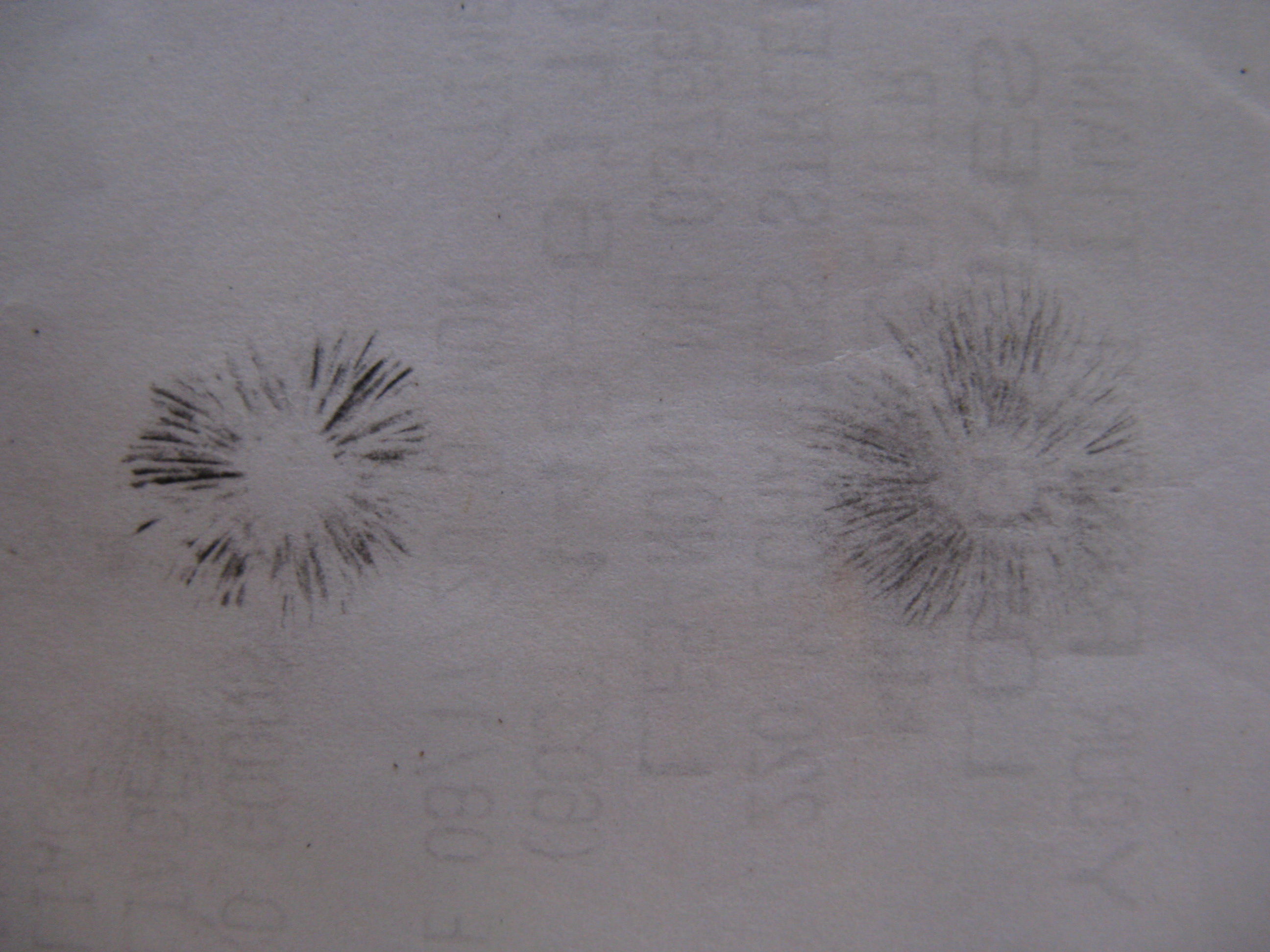
Panaeolus cinctulus spore prints

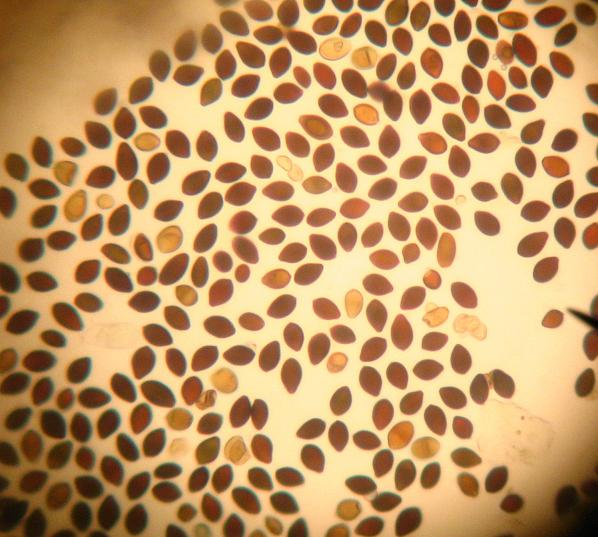
Panaeolus cinctulus spores

== See also ==
- List of Panaeolus species
- List of Psilocybin mushrooms
