= Hamaker constant =

Physical constant related to Van der Waals interactions

In molecular physics, the Hamaker constant (denoted A; named for H. C. Hamaker) is a physical constant that can be defined for a van der Waals (vdW) body–body interaction:

$$A=\pi^2C\rho_1\rho_2,$$

where ρ_{1}, ρ_{2} are the number densities of the two interacting kinds of particles, and C is the London coefficient in the particle–particle pair interaction. The magnitude of this constant reflects the strength of the vdW-force between two particles, or between a particle and a substrate.

The Hamaker constant provides the means to determine the interaction parameter C from the vdW-pair potential,

$$w(r) = \frac{-C}{r^6}.$$

Hamaker's method and the associated Hamaker constant ignores the influence of an intervening medium between the two particles of interaction. In 1956 Lifshitz developed a description of the vdW energy but with consideration of the dielectric properties of this intervening medium (often a continuous phase).

The Van der Waals forces are effective only up to several hundred angstroms. When the interactions are too far apart, the dispersion potential decays faster than $1/r^6;$ this is called the retarded regime, and the result is a Casimir–Polder force.

== See also ==
- Hamaker theory
- Intermolecular forces
- van der Waals Forces
