= Flow, Turbulence and Combustion =

- Discipline: Fluid mechanics
- Language: English
- Edited by: Michael Leschziner

Publication details
- Former name(s): Applied Scientific Research
- History: 1949–present
- Publisher: Springer Science+Business Media
- Frequency: 8/year
- Impact factor: 2.305 (2020)

Standard abbreviations
- ISO 4: Flow Turbul. Combust.

Indexing
- CODEN: FTCOF9
- ISSN: 1386-6184 (print); 1573-1987 (web)
- LCCN: 2004229167

Links
- Journal homepage

Flow, Turbulence and Combustion is a peer-reviewed scientific journal on fluid mechanics. It covers original research on fluid mechanics and combustion, with the areas of interest including industrial, geophysical, and environmental applications. The journal was established in 1949 under the name Applied Scientific Research. It obtained its present name in 1998, which also reflects its association with the European Research Community on Flow, Turbulence and Combustion (ERCOFTAC).

Since the start in 1948, the journal was published by Martinus Nijhoff Publishers. In the late 1980 it was taken over by Kluwer Academic Publishers, which subsequently became part of the current publisher, Springer Science+Business Media.
