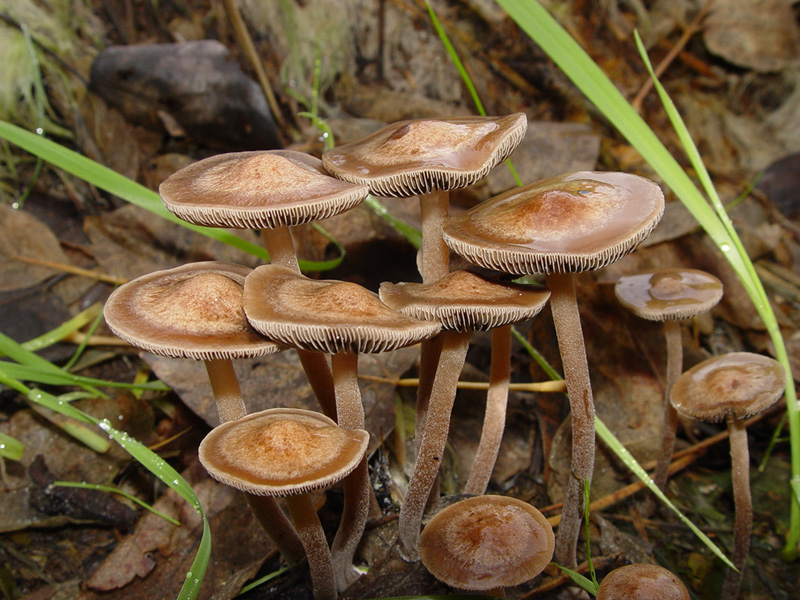
- Panaeolus cinctulus

Scientific classification
- Domain: Eukaryota
- Kingdom: Fungi
- Division: Basidiomycota
- Class: Agaricomycetes
- Order: Agaricales
- Family: Bolbitiaceae
- Genus: Panaeolus (Fries) Quél.

Type species
- Panaeolus papilionaceus (Bull.) Quél. 1872

Species
- About 98; List of Panaeolus species

Synonyms
- List: Campanularius Roussel (1806); Agaricus trF. Coprinarius Fr. (1821); Coprinarius (Fr.) P.Kumm. (1871); Anellaria P.Karst. (1879); Chalymmota P.Karst. (1879); Copelandia Bres. (1912)

= Panaeolus =

Genus of fungi

Panaeolus is a genus of small, black-spored, saprotrophic agarics. The word Panaeolus is Greek for "all variegated", alluding to the spotted gills of the mushrooms produced.

== Characteristics ==
These fungi are mostly dung and grassland species, some of which are quite common in Europe and North America. The gills of Panaeolus do not deliquesce (liquefy) as do the members of the related genera Coprinellus and Coprinopsis. Members of Panaeolus can also be mistaken for Psathyrella, however the latter genus is usually found growing on wood or lignin-enriched soils and has brittle stipes.

The gills of these mushrooms are black or grey and have a spotty, speckled or cloudy appearance, caused by the way that the dark spores ripen together in tiny patches on the gill surface; different patches darken at different times. The spores are smooth.

The closely related genus Panaeolina shares the spotted gills but they are dark brown (not black) and the spores are ornamented. This genus is sometimes treated as part of Panaeolus.

The spores are smooth or roughened, with a germ pore, and all species except for Panaeolus foenisecii have a jet black spore print.

== Edibility ==
No members of Panaeolus are used for food, though some are used as a psychedelic drug. Thirteen species of Panaeolus contain the hallucinogen psilocybin including Panaeolus cyanescens and Panaeolus cinctulus. The bluing hallucinogenic members of this genus were sometimes previously segregated into a separate (but now deprecated) genus, Copelandia, but are now universally classified in Panaeolus.

All members of this genus contain serotonin derivatives.

== Notable species ==
- Panaeolus acuminatus
- Panaeolus africanus
- Panaeolus antillarum
- Panaeolus bispora
- Panaeolus cambodginiensis
- Panaeolus cyanescens, psychoactive
- Panaeolus fimicola
- Panaeolus foenisecii (formerly Panaeolina foenisecii)
- Panaeolus olivaceus
- Panaeolus papilionaceus var. papilionaceus
- Panaeolus papilionaceus var. parvisporus
- Panaeolus semiovatus var. phalaenarum
- Panaeolus semiovatus var. semiovatus
- Panaeolus cinctulus
- Panaeolus tropicalis
