= Snellius Expedition =

Dutch oceanographic expedition in the waters of eastern Indonesia

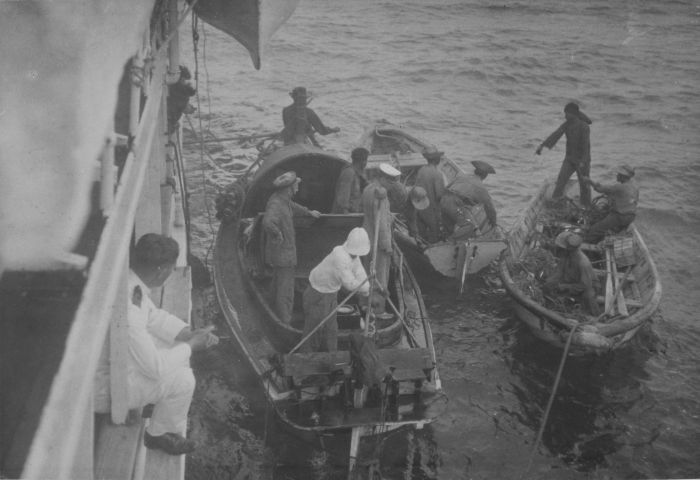
- Start: 27 July 1929
- Leader: Petrus Marinus van Riel
- Participants: Petrus Marinus van Riel

The Snellius Expedition was an oceanography expedition organized by the Dutch with emphasis on the fields of geology and oceanography in the waters of eastern Indonesia. This expedition is famous as the largest oceanological expedition ever undertaken in these waters. The expedition was conducted by the Dutch navy ship, named HNMS Willebrord Snell, named after the Dutch mathematician, Willebrord Snell. The expedition was led by Dr. P.M. van Riel and the sea voyage led by Lieutenant F. Pinke. This study took place from July 27, 1929 until 25 November 1930.
