= Hendrik Jacob Hamaker =

Dutch jurist and scholar

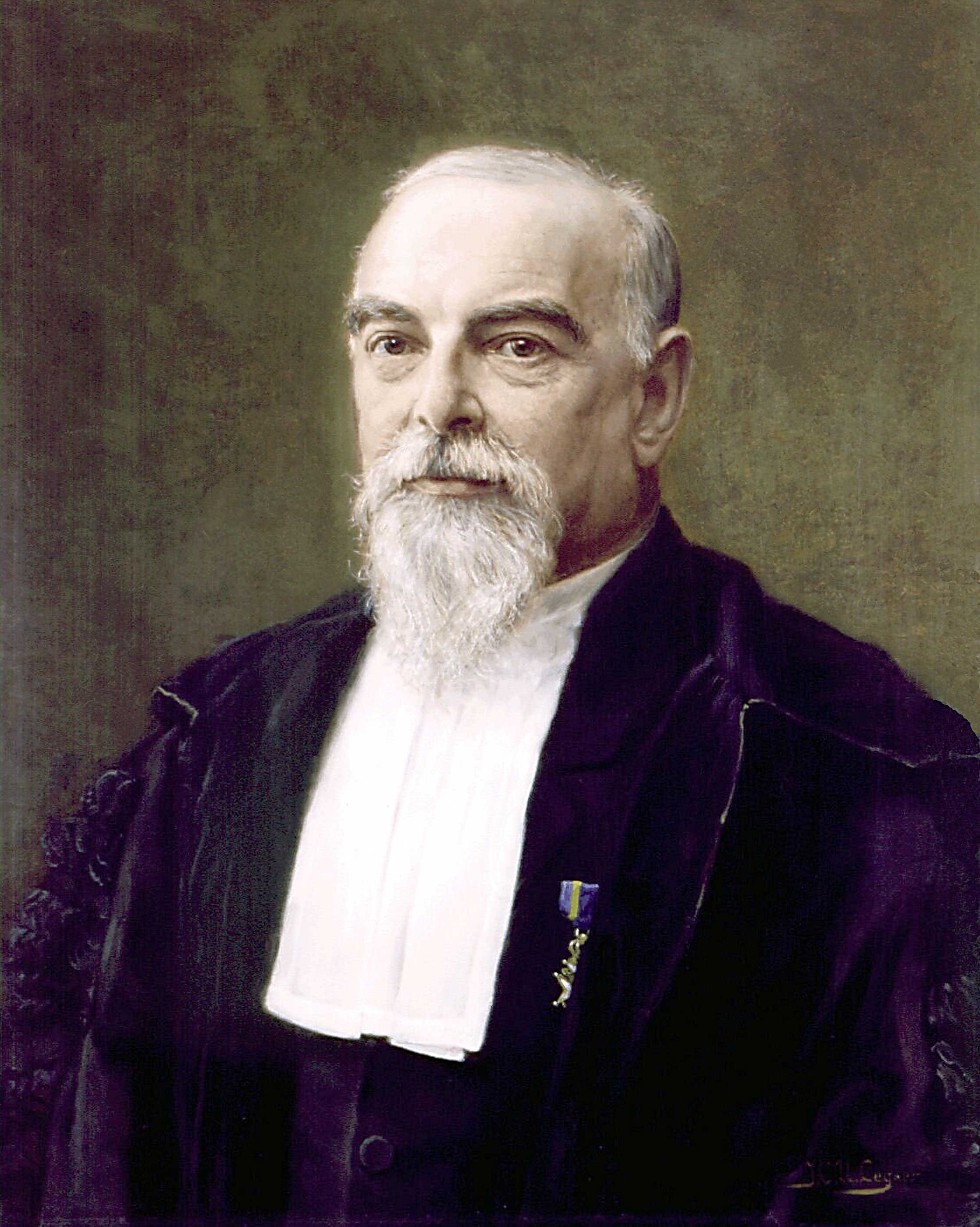
Hendrik Jacob Hamaker, c. 1900

Hendrik Jacob Hamaker (16 September 1844 in Hilversum – 2 March 1911 in Utrecht) was a Dutch jurist and scholar.

Hamaker was born to Cornelia Anna van Vloten and Hendrik Gerard Hamaker, a humanist and graduate of Leiden University who published the first Latin edition of Hugo Grotius' De Jure Praedae (On the law of prize and booty) in 1868. After studies at Leiden University, he practiced law there. Beginning in 1877, he taught civil law at the University of Utrecht, and after 1895 co-edited a leading journal of civil law, Weekblad voor Privaatrecht, Notarisambt en Registratie. He is noted for his work on judicial methodology, arguing for a substantial independence of judges from positive law.

Hamaker was elected a member of the Royal Netherlands Academy of Arts and Sciences in 1889.
