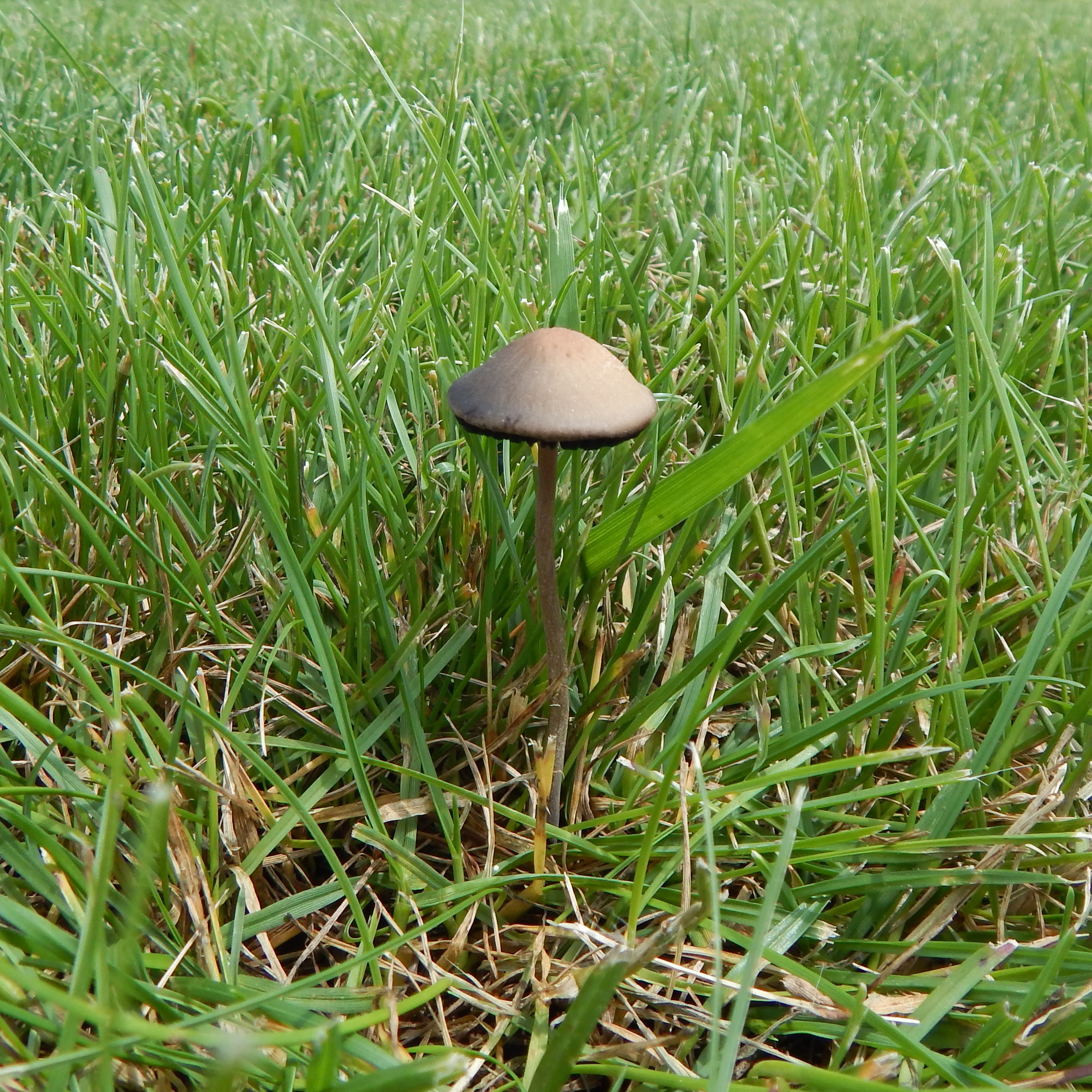

Scientific classification
- Kingdom: Fungi
- Division: Basidiomycota
- Class: Agaricomycetes
- Order: Agaricales
- Family: Bolbitiaceae
- Genus: Panaeolus
- Species: P. fimicola

Binomial name
- Panaeolus fimicola (Fr.) Quél. (1872)

Synonyms
- Agaricus fimicola Fr. (1821); Coprinarius fimicola (Fr.) P. Kumm. (1871); Panaeolus fimicola var. ater J.E. Lange (1940); Panaeolus ater (J.E. Lange) Kühner & Romagn. (1953)

= Panaeolus fimicola =

Panaeolus fimicola
- Mycological characteristics
- Gills on hymenium
- Cap is convex
- Hymenium is adnexed
- Stipe is bare
- Spore print is black
- Ecology is saprotrophic
- Edibility is psychoactive

Panaeolus fimicola, commonly known as the turf mottlegill or grass mottlegill, is a widespread but rarely identified "little brown mushroom" which sometimes contains small amounts of the hallucinogen psilocybin. Panaeolus ater is a synonym.

== Description ==
- Cap: (1)1.5— 3.5(4) cm, Campanulate then convex to plane, obtuse, dingy gray to blackish, often with reddish or hazel tones, hygrophanous, pallid grey to yellowish when dry, smooth, with a narrow brown marginal band, slightly striate at the margin when moist. Flesh thin and grayish.
- Gills: Adnate, close to crowded, at first gray-olivacous, becoming mottled and darkening to black with age, edges remaining whitish.
- Spores: Blackish gray.
- Stipe: (4)6 — 8(10) cm x 1 — 2(3) mm, equal, slender, slightly enlarging at the base, hollow, fragile, dingy white to clay, becoming brownish towards the base in age, smooth, white-pruinose at the apex, obsoletely slightly silky-striate, ring absent. Flesh is dirty ochraceous-buff; fragile.
- Taste: Not distinctive.
- Odor: Not distinctive.
- Microscopic features: Spores 10.8 — 14.2 X 6.9—9.5, ellipsoid or lemon shaped, basidia 4 spored. Gill edge cystidia fusiform, typically with long necks, gill face cystidia absent.

== Habitat and formation ==
Panaeolus fimicola can be found growing solitary to scattered in soil or dung, fertilized lawns and other grassy places, late spring to mid-fall. It is widespread and common across the Americas, as well as Europe and Africa. It has also been found in Turkey. Panaeolus fimicola will often appear during or after cold rain.

== See also ==
- List of Panaeolus species
