= Hamaker theory =

After the explanation of van der Waals forces by Fritz London, several scientists soon realised that his definition could be extended from the interaction of two molecules with induced dipoles to macro-scale objects by summing all of the forces between the molecules in each of the bodies involved. The theory is named after H. C. Hamaker, who derived the interaction between two spheres, a sphere and a wall, and presented a general discussion in a heavily cited 1937 paper.

The interaction of two bodies is then treated as the pairwise interaction of a set of N molecules at positions: R_{i} {i:1,2,... ...,N}. The distance between the molecules i and j is then:

$$R_{ij} = |R_i - R_j|$$

The interaction energy of the system is taken to be:

$$V_{\mathrm{int}}^{1,2,...N} = \frac{1}{2}\sum_{i=0}^\N \sum_{j=0(\ne i)}^\N V_{\mathrm{int}}^{ij}(R_{ij})$$

where $V_{\mathrm{int}}^{ij}$ is the interaction of molecules i and j in the absence of the influence of other molecules.

The theory is however only an approximation which assumes that the interactions can be treated independently, the theory must also be adjusted to take into account quantum perturbation theory.
