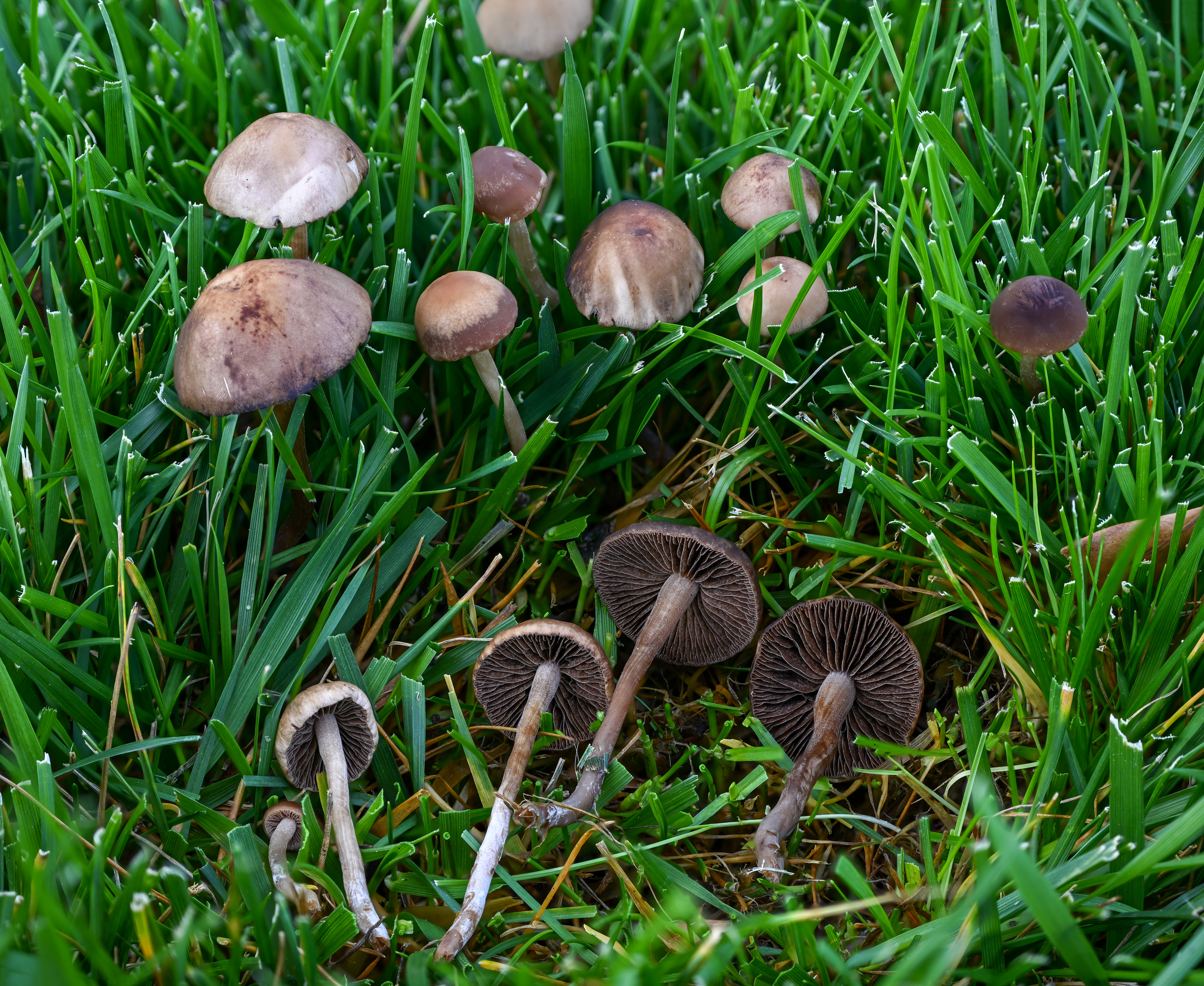

Scientific classification
- Kingdom: Fungi
- Division: Basidiomycota
- Class: Agaricomycetes
- Order: Agaricales
- Family: Bolbitiaceae
- Genus: Panaeolus
- Species: P. foenisecii

Binomial name
- Panaeolus foenisecii (Pers.) R.Maire (1933)

Synonyms
- Agaricus foenisecii Pers. (1800); Prunulus foenisecii (Pers.) Gray (1821); Psilocybe foenisecii (Pers.) Quél. (1872); Drosophila foenisecii (Pers.) Quél. (1886); Coprinarius foenisecii (Pers.) J.Schröt. (1889); Psathyra foenisecii (Pers.) G.Bertrand (1901); Panaeolina foenisecii (Pers.) Maire (1933); Psathyrella foenisecii (Pers.) A.H.Sm. (1972)

= Panaeolus foenisecii =

Species of fungus

Panaeolus foenisecii
- Mycological characteristics
- Gills on hymenium
- Cap is convex
- Hymenium is adnexed
- Stipe is bare
- Spore print is blackish-brown
- Ecology is saprotrophic
- Edibility is inedible or unknown

Panaeolus foenisecii, commonly called the haymaker's panaeolus, lawnmower's mushroom, mower's mushroom, haymaker, or brown hay mushroom, is a very common and widely distributed little brown mushroom often found on lawns. It is not edible.

== Description ==
The cap is 1 to 4 cm across, conic to convex, hygrophanous with a brownish colour when moist and tannish when dry, often with a dark band around the margin which fades as the mushroom dries.

The gills are broad, adnate, brown with lighter edges, becoming mottled as the spores mature. The spore print is deep brown, sometimes purplish.

The stipe is 3 to 8 cm by 1 to 3 mm, fragile, hollow, beige to light brown, fibrous, pruinose, and slightly striate.

It has a slightly unpleasant nutty fungal taste. The odor is nutty and slightly unpleasant.

=== Microscopic features ===
Spores measure 12–17 x 7–11 μm, subfusoid to lemon shaped, rough, dextrinoid, with an apical germ pore. Cheilocystidia subfusoid to cylindric or subcapitate, often wavy, up to 50 μm long. Pleurocystidia absent, but some authors report inconspicuous "pseudocystidia". The pileipellis a cellular cuticle with subglobose elements and has pileocystidia.

=== Similar species ===
Similar species include Agaricus campestris, Conocybe apala, Marasmius oreades, Psathyrella candolleana, and Psathyrella gracilis.

It is sometimes mistaken for the psychedelic Panaeolus cinctulus or P. olivaceus, both of which share the same habitat and can be differentiated by their jet black spores. This is probably why P. foenisecii is occasionally listed as a psychoactive species in older literature.

== Habitat and distribution ==
It can be found throughout North America. In the Pacific Northwest of the United States, the species may be the most common to appear in recently fertilized lawns. It is also found on lawns along the East Coast.

== Biochemistry ==
In 1963, Tyler and Smith found that this mushroom contains serotonin, 5-HTP and 5-hydroxyindoleacetic acid. In many field guides it is listed as psychoactive, but the mushroom does not produce any noticeable hallucinogenic effects as it only contains trace amounts of psilocybin.

== Gallery ==
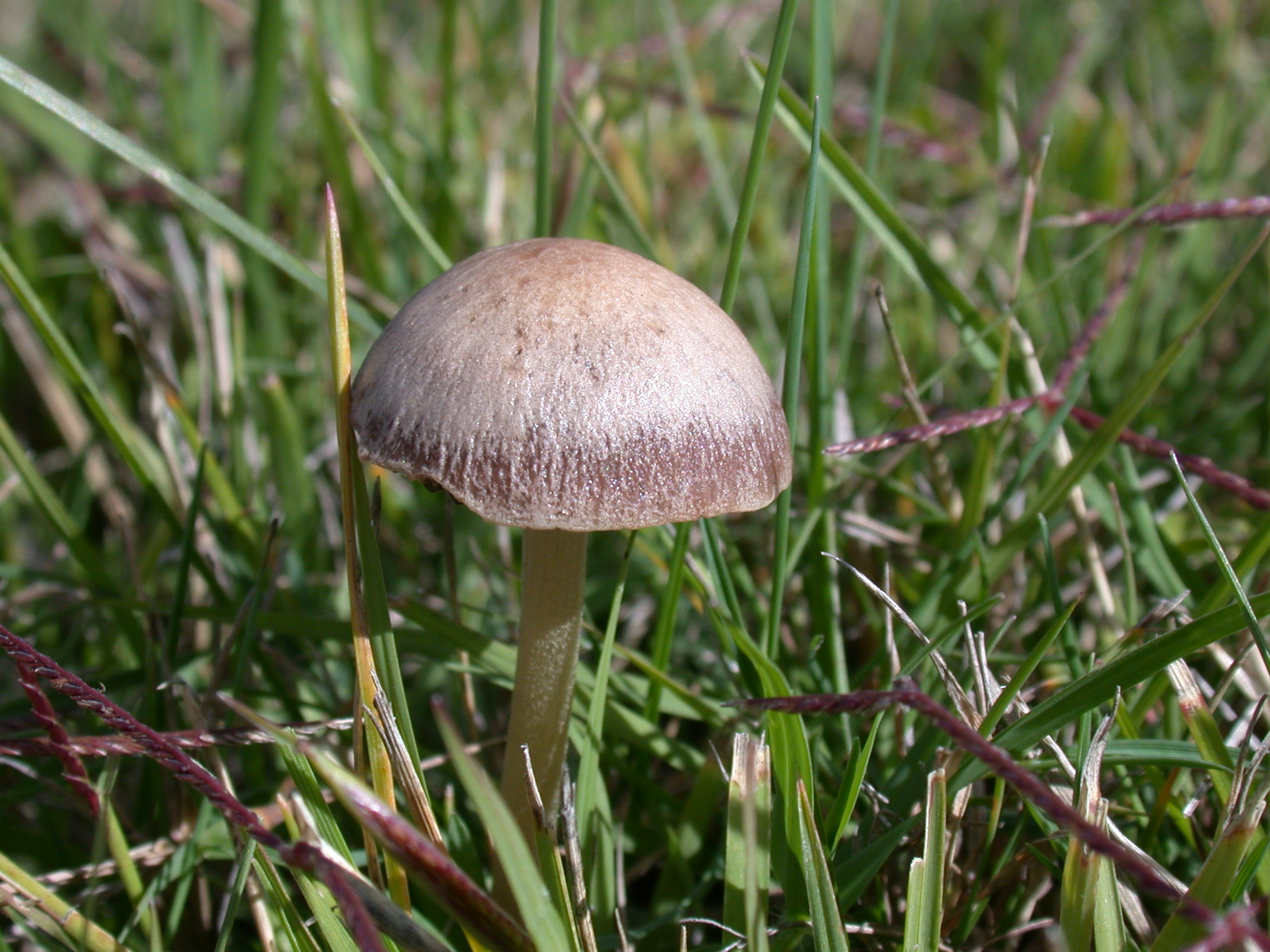
Wild P. foenisecii with banded cap

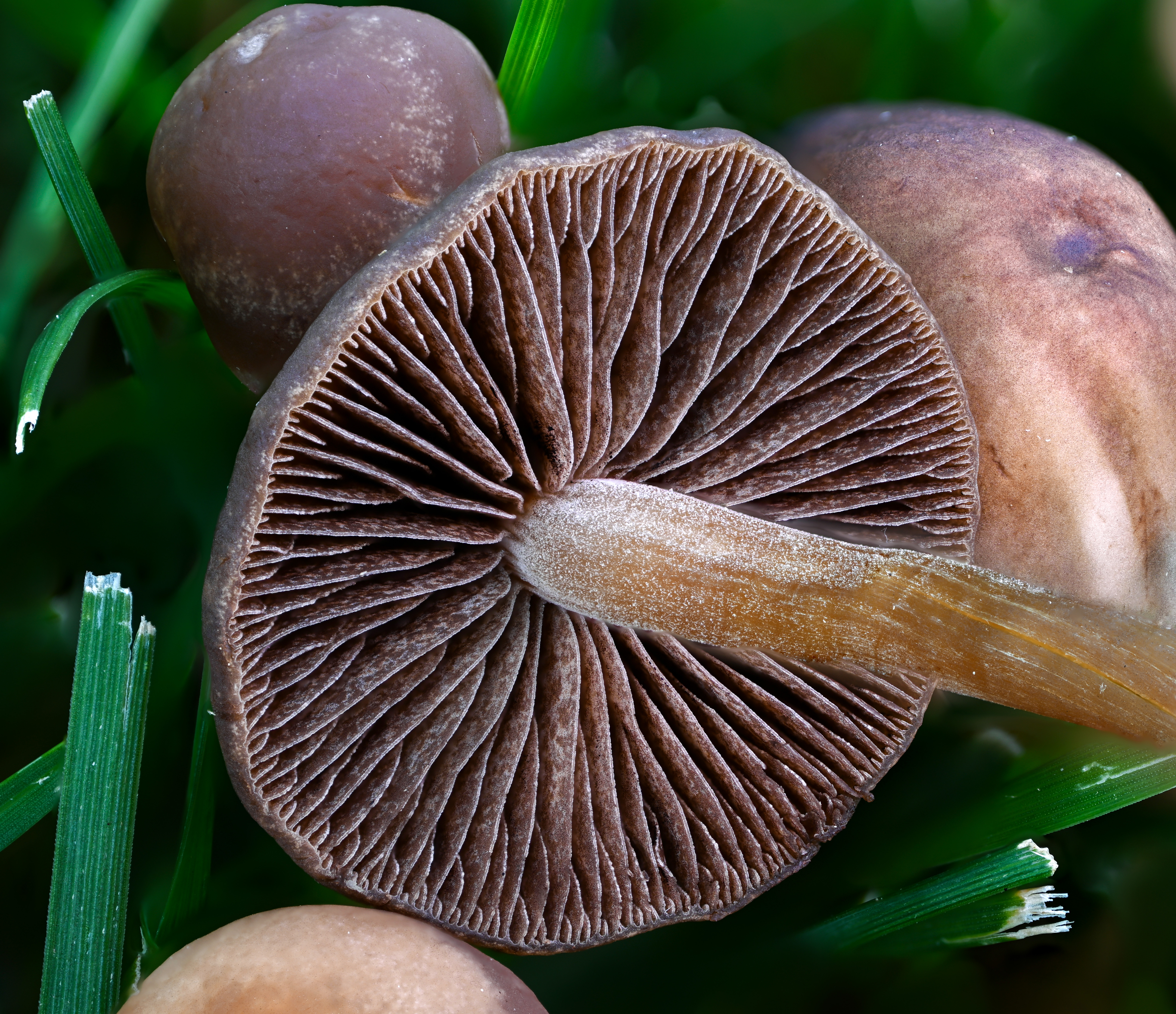
Stipe and gills

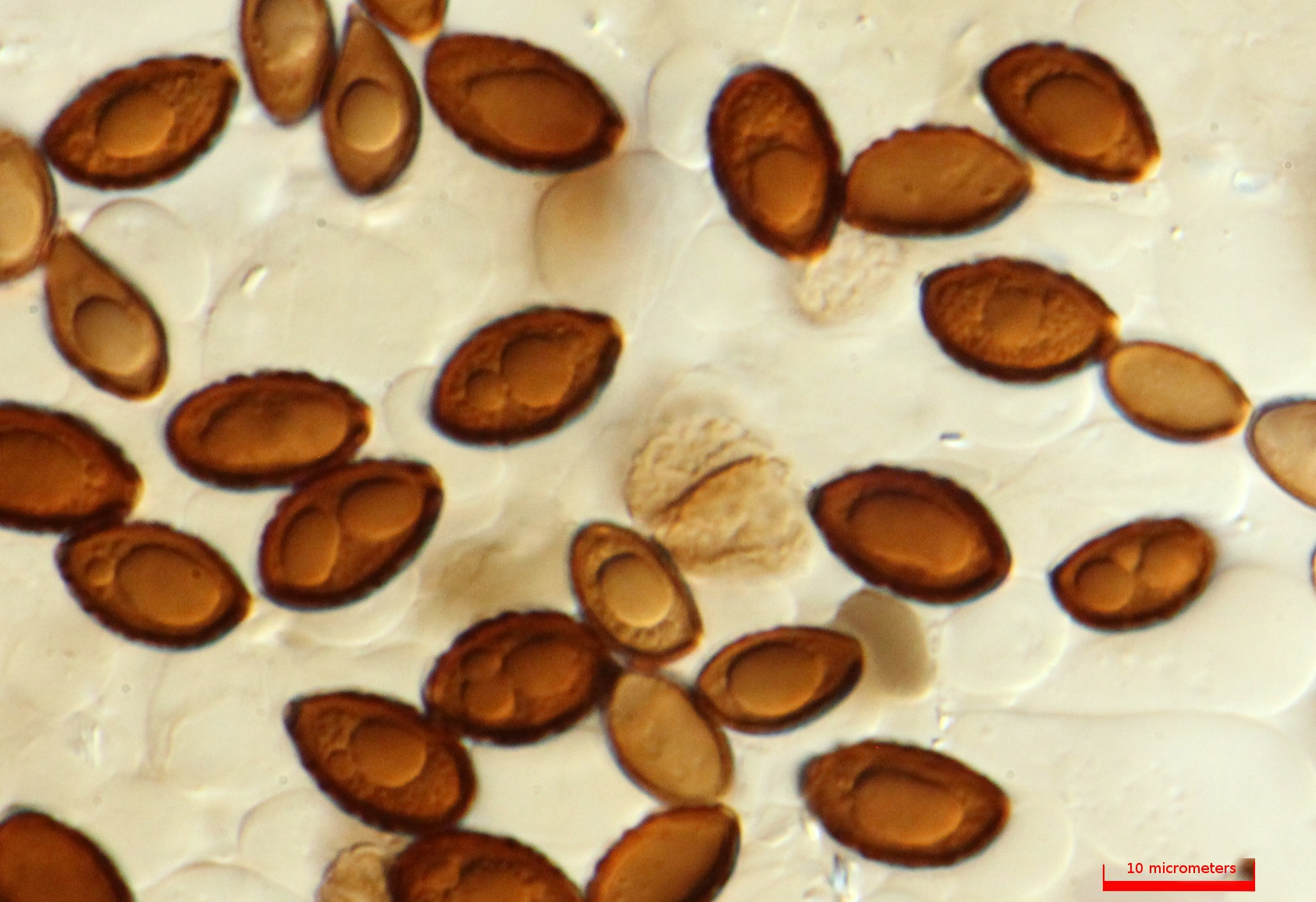
Spores magnified

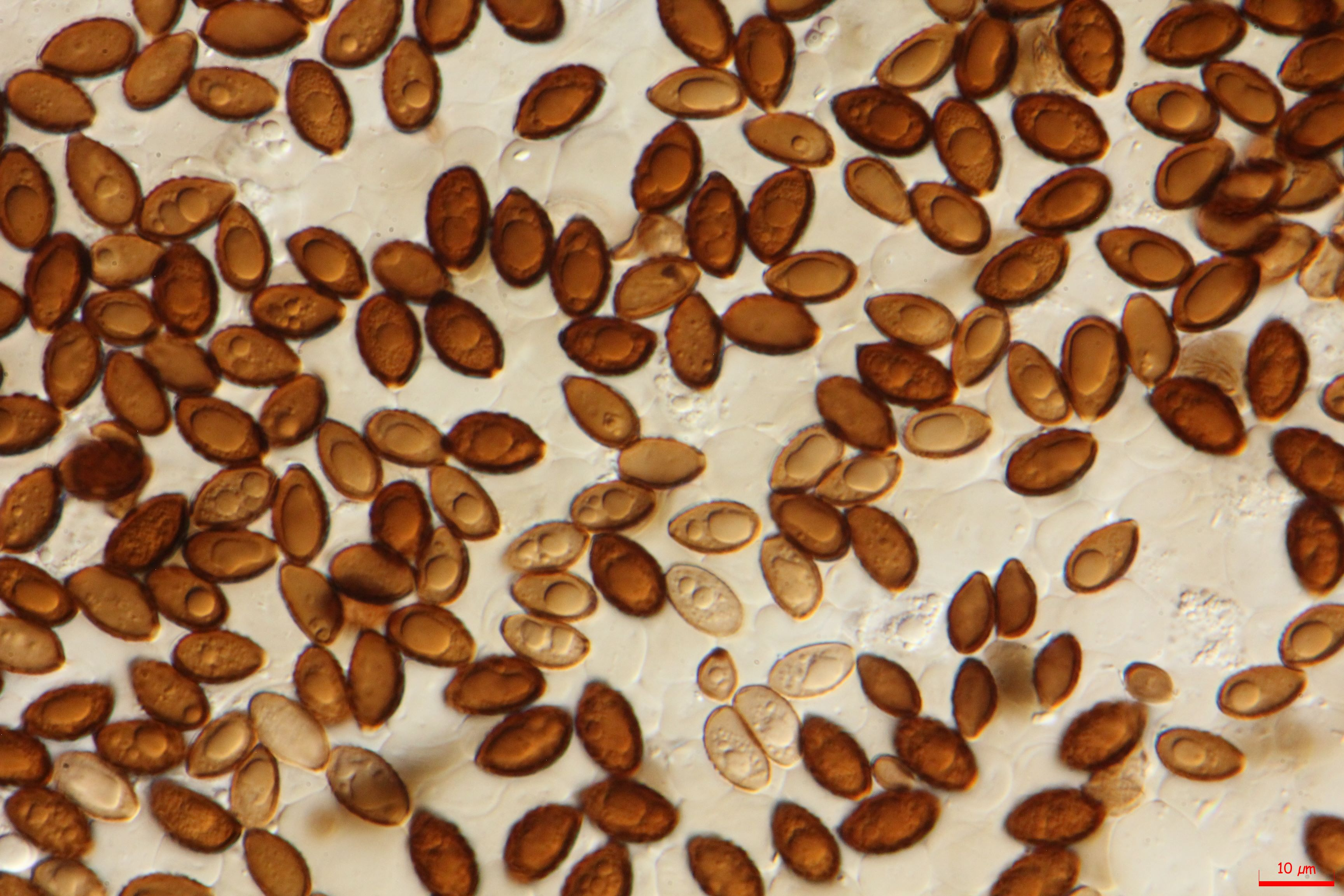
P. foenisecii spores

== See also ==
- List of Panaeolus species
